= Kansas City, Missouri =

City in Missouri, United States

Kansas City
- City
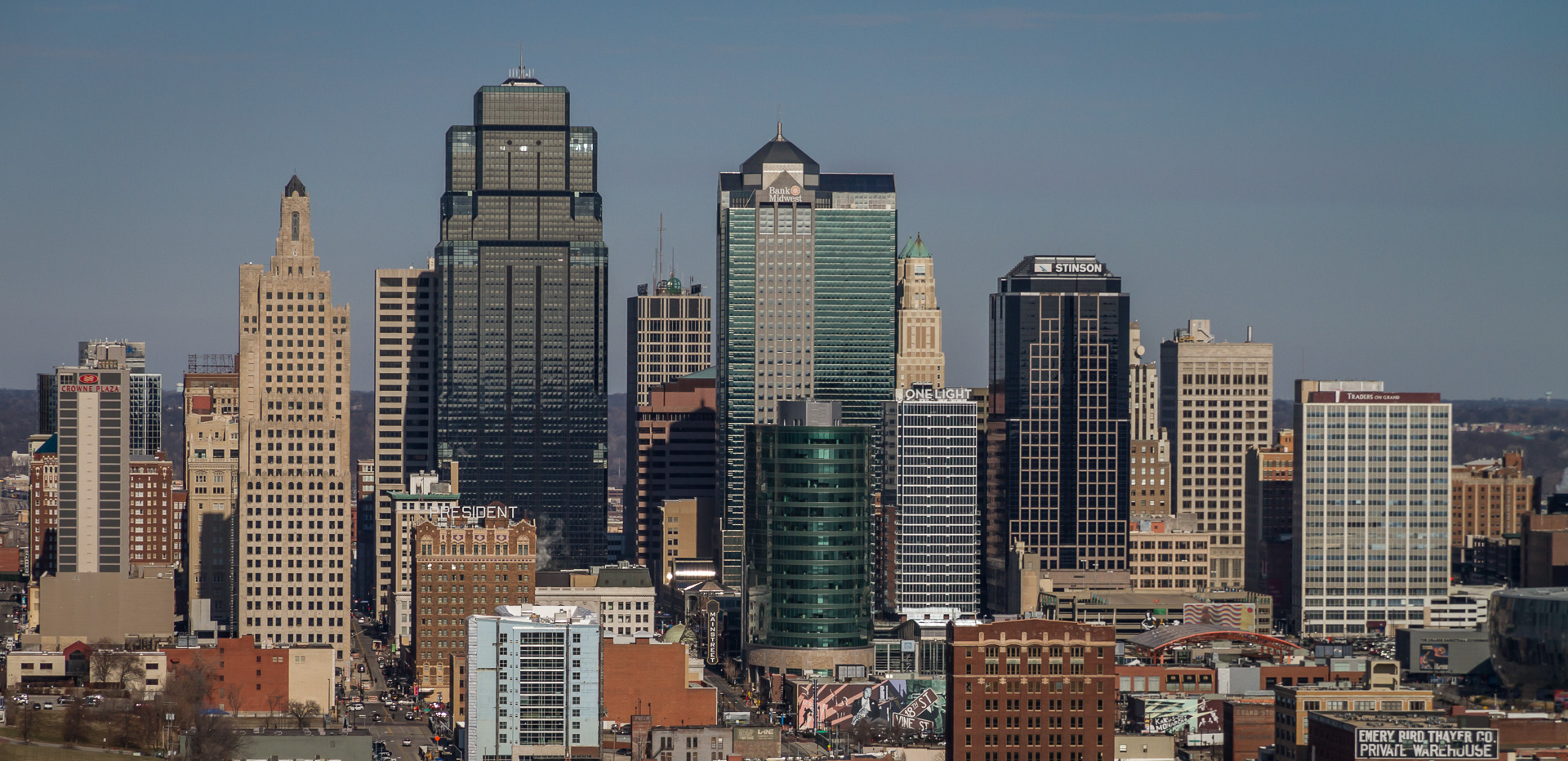
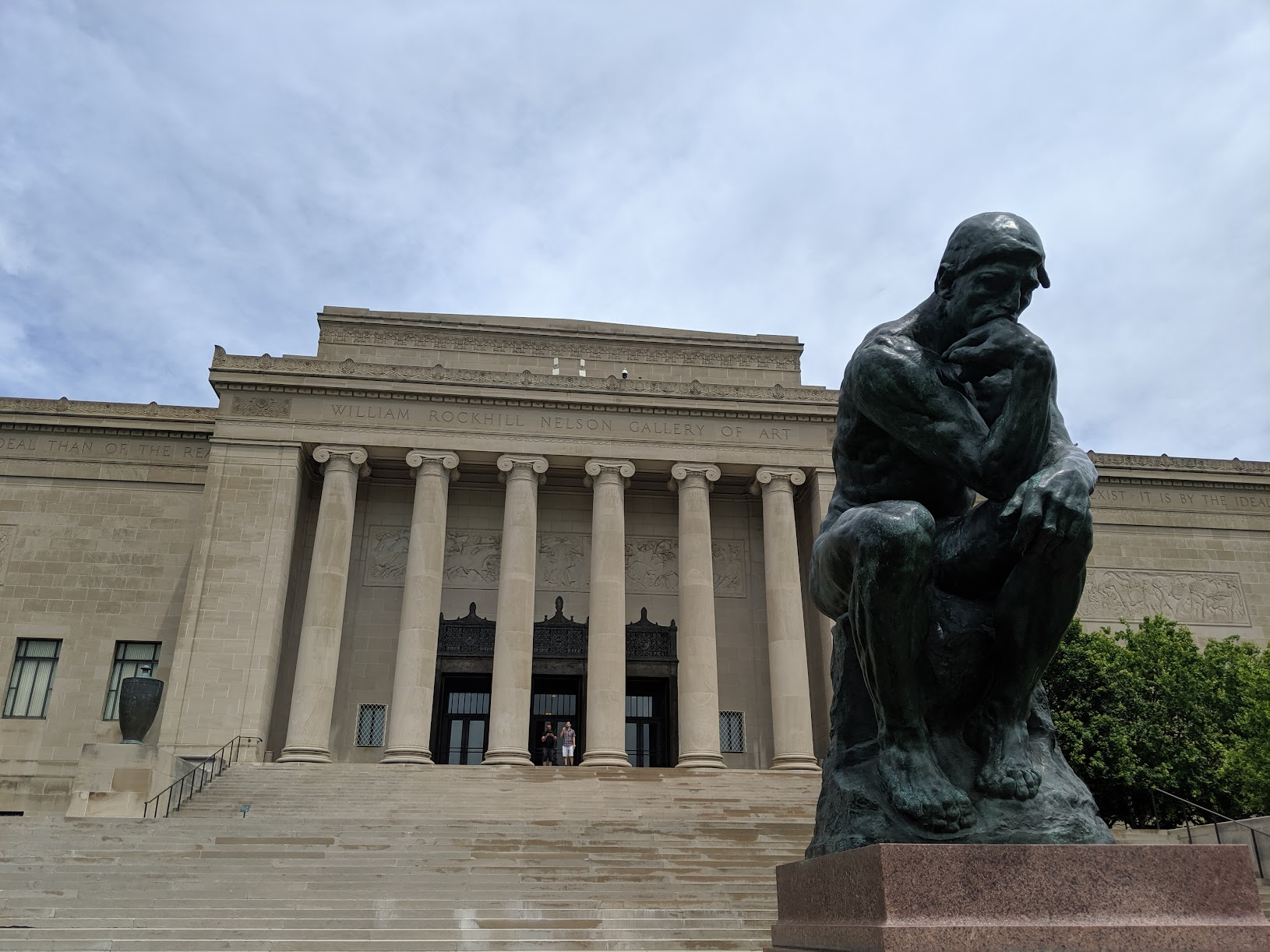
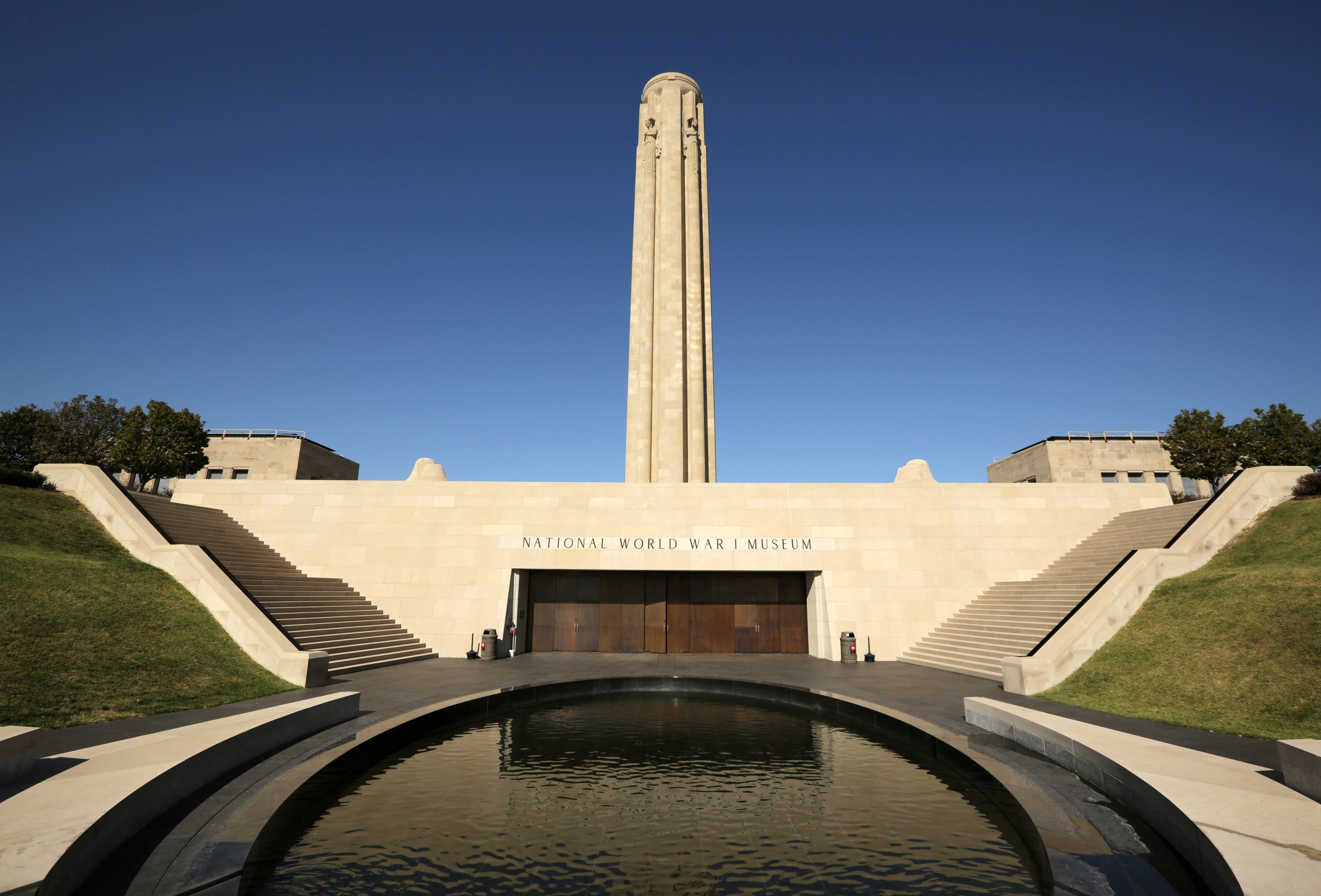
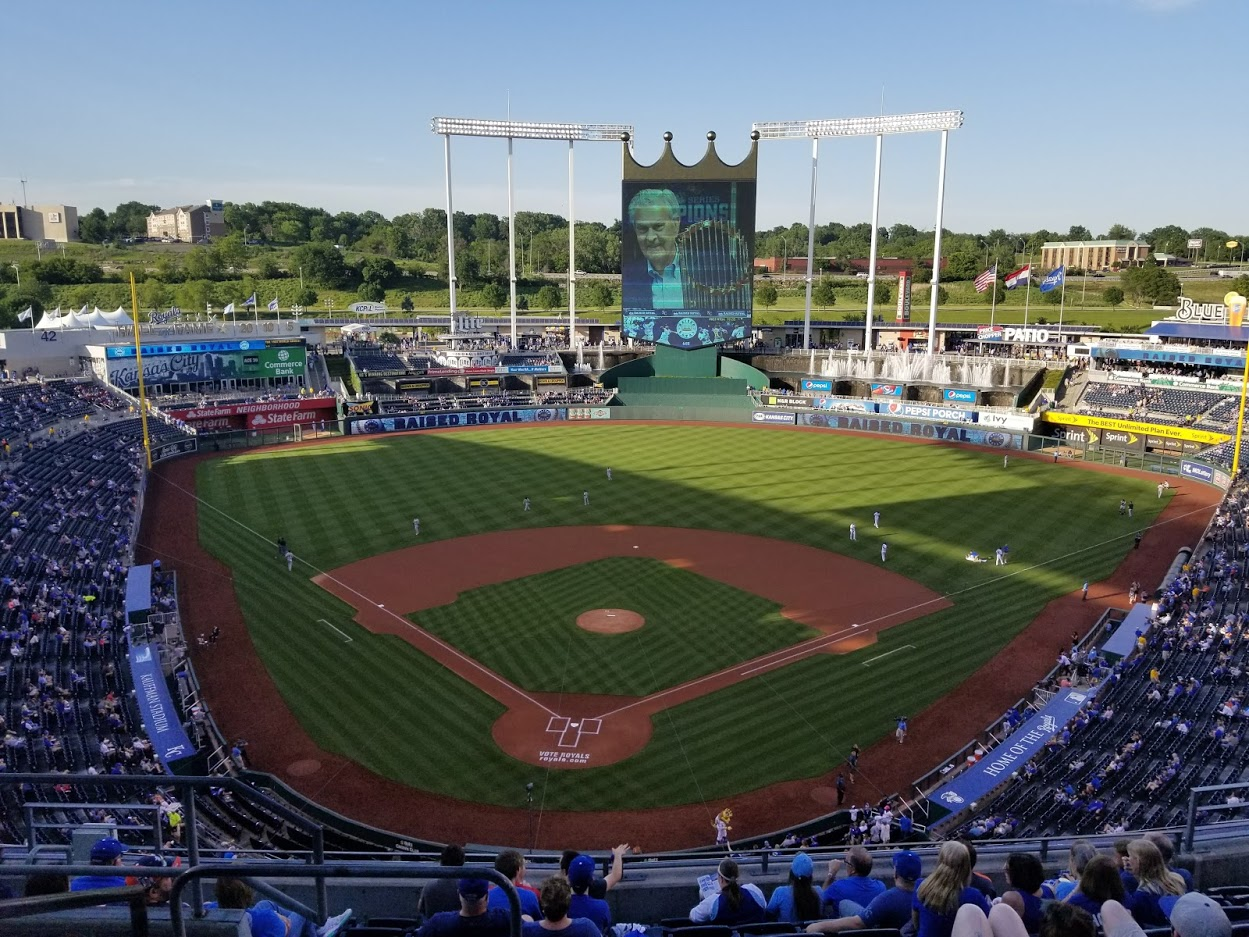
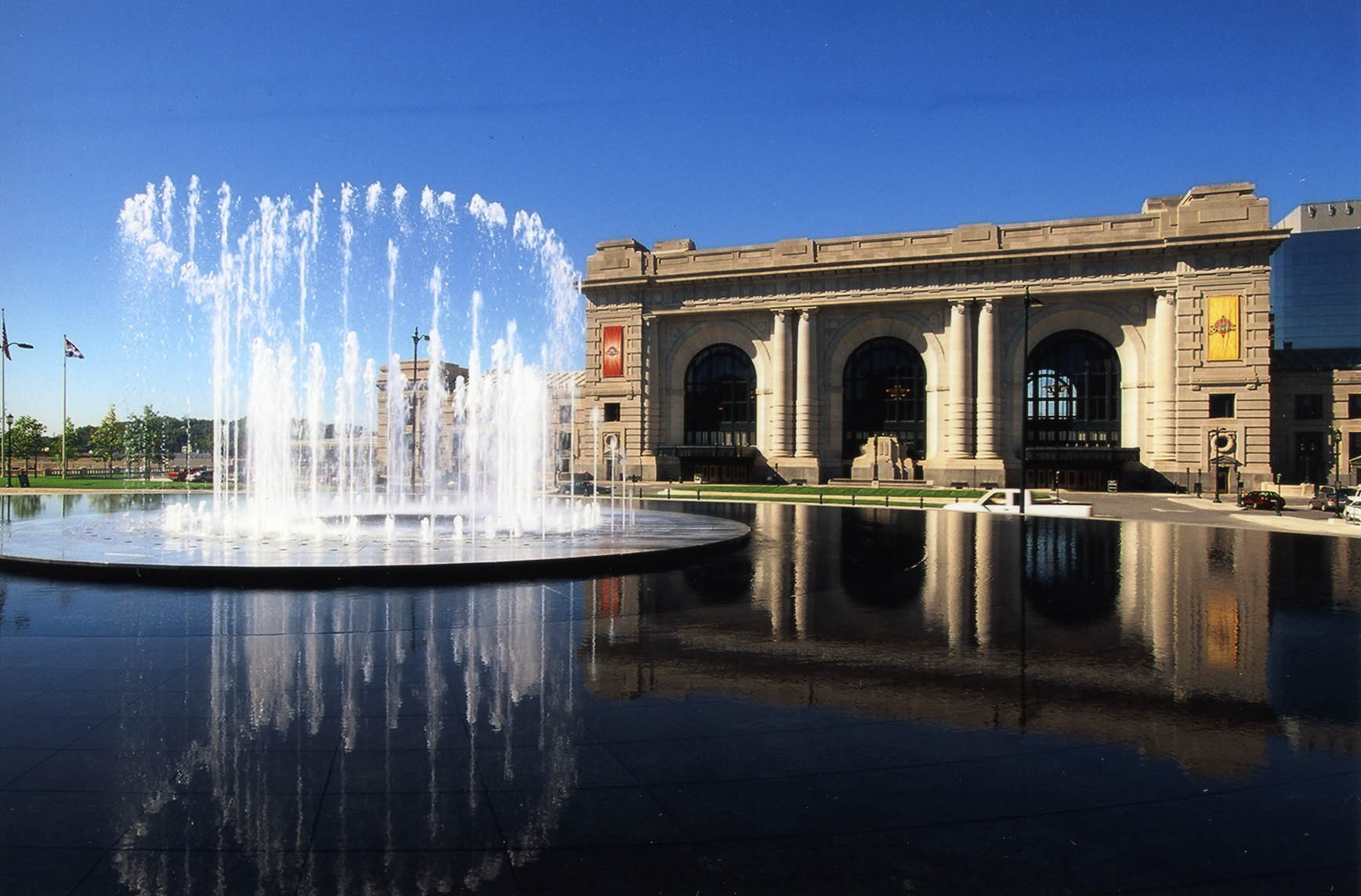
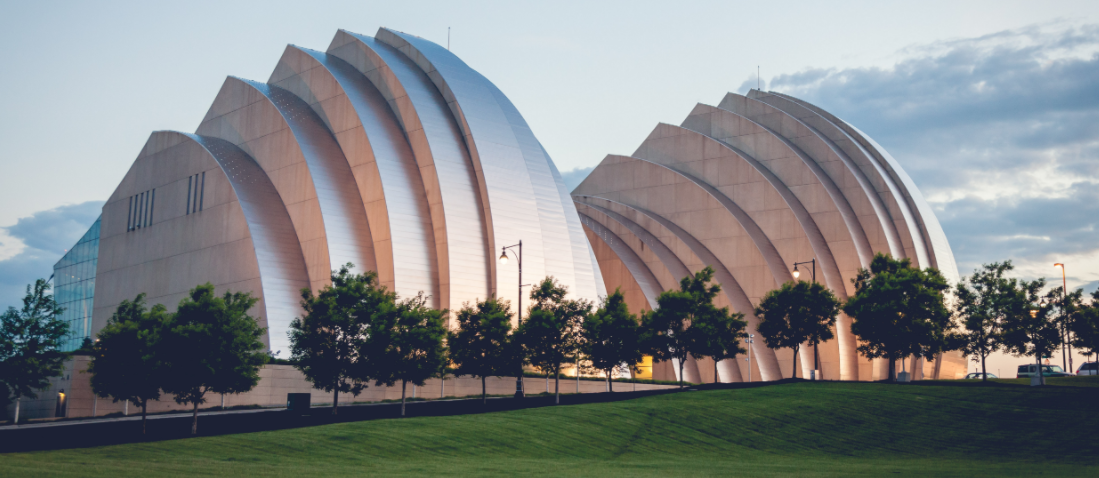
- Downtown Kansas City Nelson-Atkins Museum of Art National WWI Museum & Memorial Kauffman Stadium Union Station Kauffman Center for the Performing Arts

- Flag Logo
- Nicknames: "KC", "KCMO", the "City of Fountains", "Paris of the Plains", and the "Heart of America"
- Interactive map of Kansas City
- Location within Missouri Location within the United States Location within North America
- Coordinates: 39°05′59″N 94°34′42″W
- Country: United States
- State: Missouri
- Counties: Jackson, Clay, Platte, Cass
- Incorporated (Town): June 1, 1850; 176 years ago
- Incorporated (City): March 28, 1853; 173 years ago
- Named for: Kansas River

Government
  - Type: Council-manager
  - Body: Kansas City City Council
  - Mayor: Quinton Lucas (D)
  - City Manager: Mario Vasquez
  - City Clerk: Marilyn Sanders

Area
  - City: 318.80 sq mi (825.69 km^{2})
  - Land: 314.73 sq mi (815.14 km^{2})
  - Water: 4.07 sq mi (10.55 km^{2}) 1.28%
  - Urban: 714.1 sq mi (1,849.5 km^{2})
  - Metro: 7,952 sq mi (20,596 km^{2})
- Elevation: 909 ft (277 m)

Population (2020)
  - City: 508,090
  - Estimate (2025): 521,220 ▲
  - Rank: 38th in the United States; 1st in Missouri
  - Density: 1,614.4/sq mi (623.31/km^{2})
  - Urban: 1,674,218 (US: 34th)
  - Urban density: 2,344/sq mi (905.2/km^{2})
  - Metro: 2,253,579 (US: 31st)
- Demonym: Kansas Citian

GDP
  - Metro: $169.501 billion (2022)
- Time zone: UTC−06:00 (CST)
  - Summer (DST): UTC−05:00 (CDT)
- ZIP Codes: 64XXX: 64101–64102, 64105–64106, 64108–64114, 64116–64121, 64123–64134, 64136–64139, 64141, 64144–64158, 64161–64168, 64170–64171, 64179–64180, 64184, 64187–64188, 64190–64191, 64195–64199, 64999
- Area codes: 816, 975
- FIPS code: 29000–38000
- GNIS feature ID: 748198
- Website: kcmo.gov

Kansas City, abbreviated KC or KCMO, is the largest city in the U.S. state of Missouri by both population and area. It is located on the Missouri River at its confluence with the Kansas River, within Jackson, Clay, Platte and Cass counties. It is the 37th-most populous city in the United States and sixth-most populous city in the Midwest, with a population of 508,090 at the 2020 census. The Kansas City metropolitan area, which straddles the Missouri–Kansas state line, is the 31st-most populous metropolitan area in the nation, at 2.25 million residents.

Kansas City was founded in the 1830s as a port on the Missouri and Kansas rivers. On June 1, 1850, the town of Kansas was incorporated; soon afterwards, a region designated as the Kansas Territory was established. Confusion between the city and the territory of Kansas ensued, so the name Kansas City was assigned to distinguish the city from the territory. The city's growth was closely tied to westward expansion, as railroads and the Kansas City Stockyards established it as a major transportation and livestock center.

Situated along Missouri's western border with Kansas, Kansas City encompasses 319.03 square miles (826.3 km^{2}), making it the 25th-largest U.S. city by area. It is one of the two county seats of Jackson County, alongside Independence. The city is known for landmarks and districts including the River Market, 18th and Vine, and Country Club Plaza. It is internationally recognized for Kansas City jazz, its extensive system of fountains, the Kansas City Chiefs and Kansas City Royals sports franchises, and regional cuisine including Kansas City-style barbecue and strip steak.

== History ==
The town of Kansas, Missouri, was incorporated on June 1, 1850, reincorporated and renamed "City of Kansas" on March 28, 1853, and renamed "Kansas City" in 1889. The Kansas City metropolitan area straddles the border between Missouri and Kansas at Kaw Point, and was considered a good place to settle. The Antioch Christian Church, Dr. James Compton House, and Woodneath are listed on the National Register of Historic Places.

=== Indigenous peoples and settlement ===
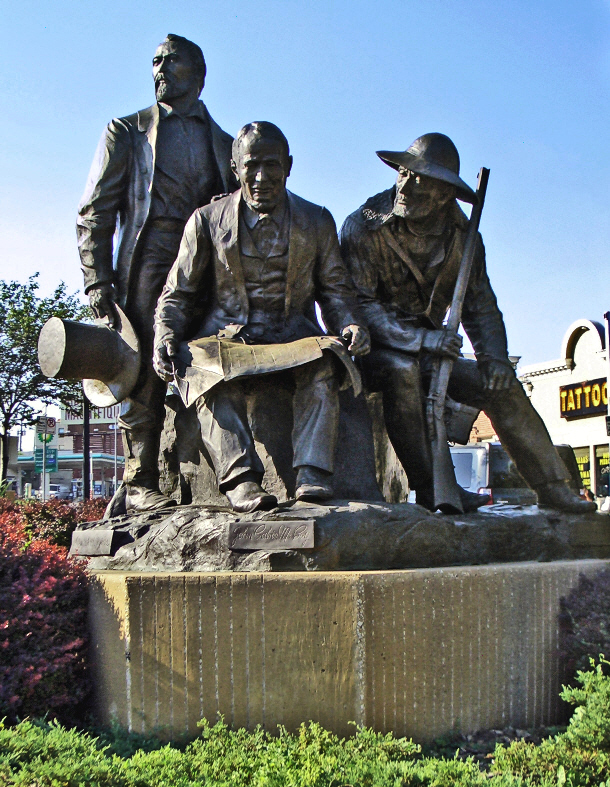
The Kansas City Pioneer Square monument in Westport features Pony Express founder Alexander Majors, Westport and Kansas City founder John Calvin McCoy, and mountain man Jim Bridger who owned Chouteau's Store.

In past centuries, the area's tribal inhabitants include the Hopewell tradition, Mississippian culture, Kansa, Osage, Otoe, and Missouri. The first documented European visitor to the eventual site of Kansas City was French military officer Étienne de Veniard, Sieur de Bourgmont, who was also the first European to explore the lower Missouri River. Criticized for his response to the Native American attack on Fort Détroit, he had deserted his post as fort commander and was avoiding French authorities. Bourgmont lived with a Native American wife in a village about 90 miles (140 km) east near Brunswick, Missouri, where he illegally traded furs.

To clear his name, he wrote Exact Description of Louisiana, of Its Harbors, Lands and Rivers, and Names of the Indian Tribes That Occupy It, and the Commerce and Advantages to Be Derived Therefrom for the Establishment of a Colony in 1713 and The Route to Be Taken to Ascend the Missouri River in 1714. In the documents, he describes the junction of the "Grande Riv[ière] des Cansez" and Missouri River, as the first adoption of those names. French cartographer Guillaume Delisle used the descriptions to make the area's first reasonably accurate map.

The Spanish took over the region in the Treaty of Paris in 1763, but were not to play a major role other than taxing and licensing Missouri River ship traffic. The French continued their fur trade under Spanish license, before France reclaimed the territory in 1800. Then, after the 1803 Louisiana Purchase, explorers Lewis and Clark visited the confluence of the Kansas and Missouri rivers on their way to the Pacific West, in June 1804, and on their return, in September 1806. Clark noted it had "a Commanding Situation" to build a fort.

In 1821, the French Chouteau fur-trading family, active in St. Louis as early as 1765, reached the location of what would become Kansas City. There, François Chouteau established a trading post consisting of warehouses and dwellings, dubbed "Chouteau's Landing", the first permanent settlement of the site. The settlement changed locations several times due to floods but the Chouteau family, along with the French Canadian trappers, traders and voyageurs that had come with them, remained in the area.

With successive treaties and the 1830 national Indian Removal Act, tribes originally living in Missouri were progressively forced to move west, to Kansas and further, accelerating the settlement of the Kansas City area by whites.

In 1831, a group of Mormons from New York state led by Joseph Smith settled in the area. They built the first school within what became Kansas City, but were forced out by mob violence in 1833. In 1831, Gabriel Prudhomme Sr., a Canadian trapper and partner of François Chouteau, purchased 257 acres (104 ha) fronting the Missouri River. He established a home for his wife, Josephine, and six children, and operated a ferry on the river.

In 1833, John Calvin McCoy, son of Baptist missionary Isaac McCoy and brother-in-law of Johnston Lykins, established West Port along the Santa Fe, Oregon and California trails, three miles (4.8 kilometers) south of the river. In 1834, McCoy established Westport Landing on a rocky ledge situated on a bend in the Missouri, to serve as a landing point for West Port, with Lykins as the first postmaster. He found it more convenient to have his goods offloaded at the Prudhomme landing, next to Chouteau's landing, than in Independence. Following the same route as emigrants and gold seekers headed toward the Pacific Coast, Sante Fe traders shipped goods up the Missouri river by steamboat to Westport before continuing West by land.

On the year of Gabriel Prudhomme's death, a group of fourteen investors purchased his land at auction on November 14, 1838, for $4,220. By 1839, the investors divided the property and the first lots were sold in 1846, after legal complications were settled. The remaining lots were sold by February 1850.

=== Founding and westward expansion ===
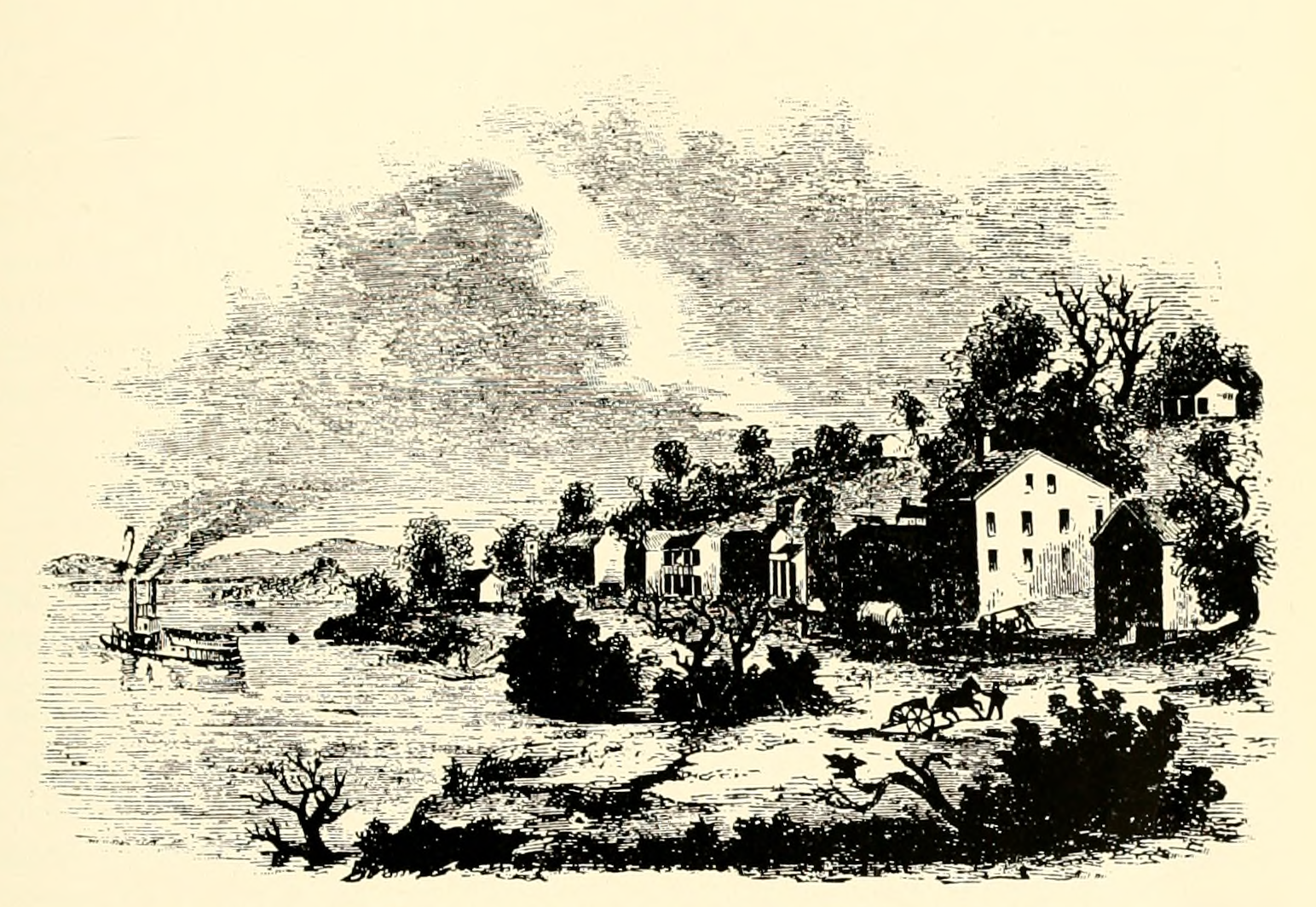
In 1843, Kansas City was depicted in a history of Oregon.

On June 3, 1850, the landing area was incorporated as the town of Kansas, Missouri, named after the nearby native tribe. By that time, the towns of Kansas, Westport, and nearby Independence, had become critical points in the westward expansion of the United States. Three major trails – the Santa Fe, California, and Oregon – all passed through Jackson County.

On February 22, 1853, Kansas was reincorporated and renamed the City of Kansas with its first elected mayor, William Samuel Gregory. Due to a legal discovery of living outside city boundaries, he was soon succeeded by Johnston Lykins as the second (but first legally elected) mayor. The city had an area of 0.70 square miles (1.8 km^{2}) and a population of 2,500. The boundary lines extended from the middle of the Missouri River south to what is now Ninth Street, and from Bluff Street on the west to a point between Holmes Road and Charlotte Street on the east.

During the American Civil War, the city and its immediate surroundings were the focus of intense military activity. Although the First Battle of Independence in August 1862 resulted in a Confederate States Army victory, the Confederates were unable to leverage their win in any significant fashion, as Kansas City was occupied by Union troops and proved too heavily fortified to assault. The Second Battle of Independence, which occurred on October 21–22, 1864, as part of Sterling Price's Missouri expedition of 1864, also resulted in a Confederate triumph. Once again their victory proved hollow, as Price was decisively defeated in the pivotal Battle of Westport the next day, effectively ending Confederate efforts to regain Missouri.

General Thomas Ewing, Jr., in response to a successful raid on nearby Lawrence, Kansas, led by William Quantrill, issued General Order No. 11, forcing the eviction of residents in four western Missouri counties – including Jackson – except those living in the city and nearby communities and those whose allegiance to the Union was certified by Ewing.

=== Late 19th and early 20th centuries ===
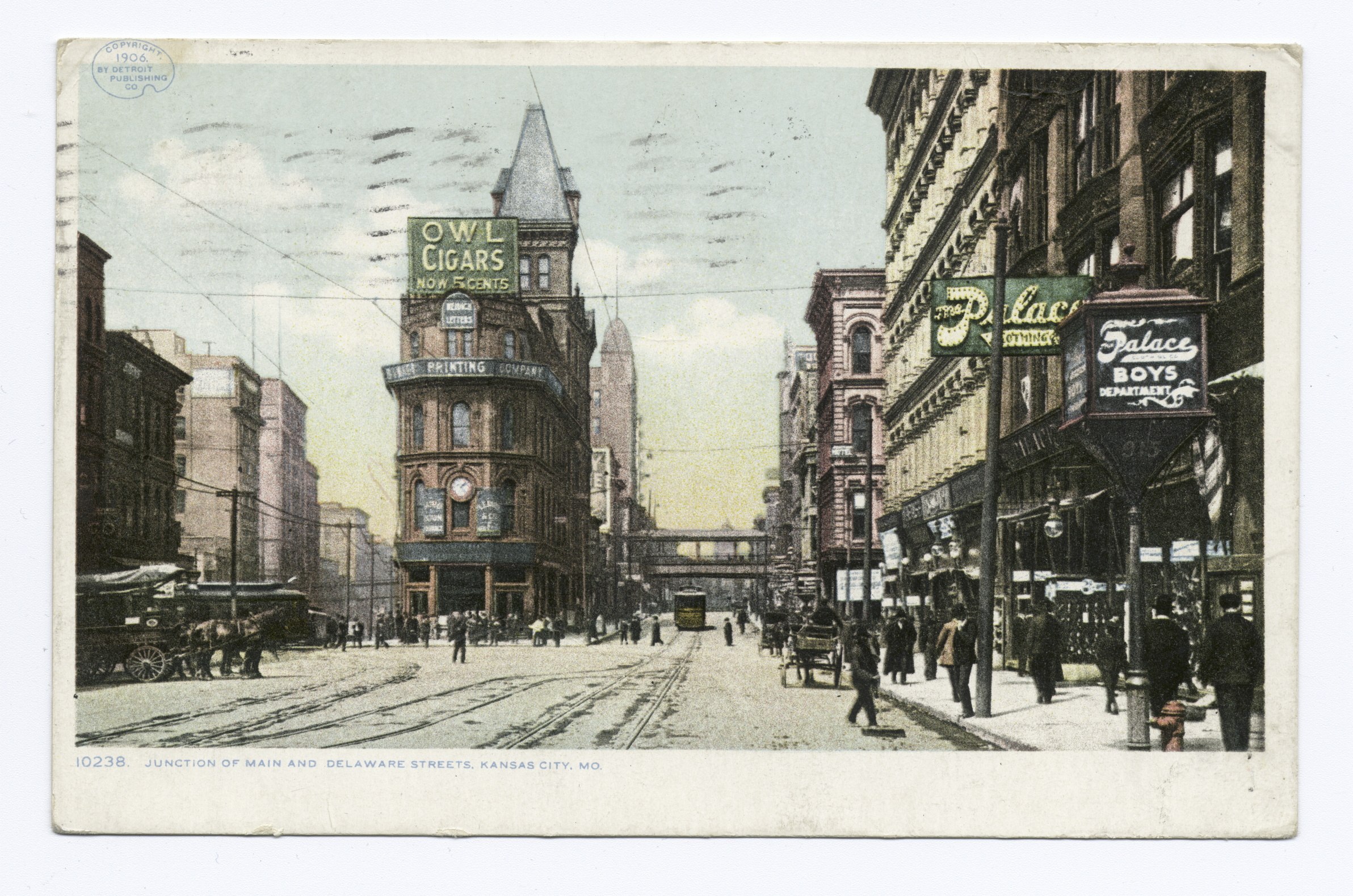
The junction of Main and Delaware Streets in 1898

After the Civil War, Kansas City grew rapidly. The selection of the city over Leavenworth, Kansas, for the Hannibal and St. Joseph Railroad bridge over the Missouri River brought significant growth. The population exploding after 1869, when Hannibal Bridge, designed by Octave Chanute, opened. The boom prompted a name change to Kansas City in 1889, and the city limits to be extended south and east. Westport became part of Kansas City on December 2, 1897. In 1900, Kansas City was the 22nd largest city in the country, with a population of 163,752 residents.

Landscape architect George Kessler shaped Kansas City into a leading example of the City Beautiful movement, with a network of boulevards and parks. New neighborhoods like Southmoreland and the Rockhill District were conceived to accommodate the city's largest residencies of palatial proportions.

The obsolescence of Union Depot in West Bottoms in favor of the new Union Station in 1914, and the opening of the Liberty Memorial in 1923, provided two of the city's most identifiable landmarks. Robert A. Long, president of the Liberty Memorial Association, was a driving force in the funding for construction. Long was a longtime resident and wealthy businessman. He built the R. A. Long Building for the Long-Bell Lumber Company, his home, Corinthian Hall (now the Kansas City Museum) and Longview Farm. Further spurring Kansas City's growth was the opening of the innovative Country Club Plaza development by J. C. Nichols in 1925, as part of his Country Club District plan.

In 1911, Elias Disney moved his family from Marceline to Kansas City. They lived in a new home at 3028 Bellefontaine with a garage he built, in which Walt Disney made his first animation. In 1919, Walt returned from France where he had served as a Red Cross ambulance driver in World War I. He started the first animation company in Kansas City, Laugh-O-Gram Studio, in which he designed Mickey Mouse. When the company went bankrupt, Walt Disney moved to Hollywood and started The Walt Disney Company on October 16, 1923.

The Kansas City streetcar system once had hundreds of miles of streetcars running through the city and was one of the largest systems in the country. In 1903 the 8th Street Tunnel was built as an underground streetcar system through the city. The last run of the streetcar was on June 23, 1957, but the tunnel still exists.

==== Pendergast political machine ====
At the start of the 20th century, political machines gained clout in the city, with the one led by Tom Pendergast dominating the city by 1925. Several important buildings and structures were built during this time, including the Kansas City City Hall and the Jackson County Courthouse. During this time, he aided one of his nephew's friends, Harry S. Truman, in a political career. Truman eventually became a senator, then vice president, then president. The machine fell in 1939 when Pendergast, riddled with health problems, pleaded guilty to tax evasion after long federal investigations. His biographers have summed up his uniqueness:

Pendergast may bear comparison to various big-city bosses, but his open alliance with hardened criminals, his cynical subversion of the democratic process, his monarchistic style of living, his increasingly insatiable gambling habit, his grasping for a business empire, and his promotion of Kansas City as a wide-open town with every kind of vice imaginable, combined with his professed compassion for the poor and very real role as city builder, made him bigger than life, difficult to characterize.

=== Mid- to late 20th century ===
Troost Avenue was once the eastern edge of Kansas City, Missouri and a residential corridor nicknamed Millionaire Row. It is now widely seen as one of the city's most prominent racial and economic dividing lines due to urban decay, which was caused by white flight. During the civil rights era the city blocked people of color from moving to homes west of Troost Avenue, causing the areas east of Troost to have one of the worst murder rates in the country. This led to the dominating economic success of neighboring Johnson County.

In 1950, African Americans represented 12.2% of Kansas City's population. The city's most populous ethnic group, non-Hispanic whites, declined from 89.5% in 1930 to 54.9% in 2010.

In 1940, the city had about 400,000 residents; by 2000, it had about 440,000. From 1940 to 1960, the city more than doubled its physical size, while increasing its population by only about 75,000. By 1970, the city covered approximately 316 square miles (820 km^{2}), more than five times its size in 1940. Aggressively annexing the surrounding suburbs and undeveloped land spared Kansas City from the severe population loss suffered by cities like St. Louis and Detroit, similar cities which both lost over 50% of their population in the postwar era. In the most neglected neighborhoods, however, the same pattern of abandonment occurred and left behind massive numbers of vacant lots and abandoned homes, especially in the areas east of Troost.

The Hyatt Regency walkway collapse was a major disaster that occurred on July 17, 1981, killing 114 people and injuring more than 200 others during a tea dance in the 45-story Hyatt Regency hotel in Crown Center. It is the deadliest structural collapse in US history other than the September 11 attacks. In 2015 a memorial called the Skywalk Memorial Plaza was built for the families of the victims of the disaster, across the street from the hotel which is now a Sheraton.

=== 21st century ===
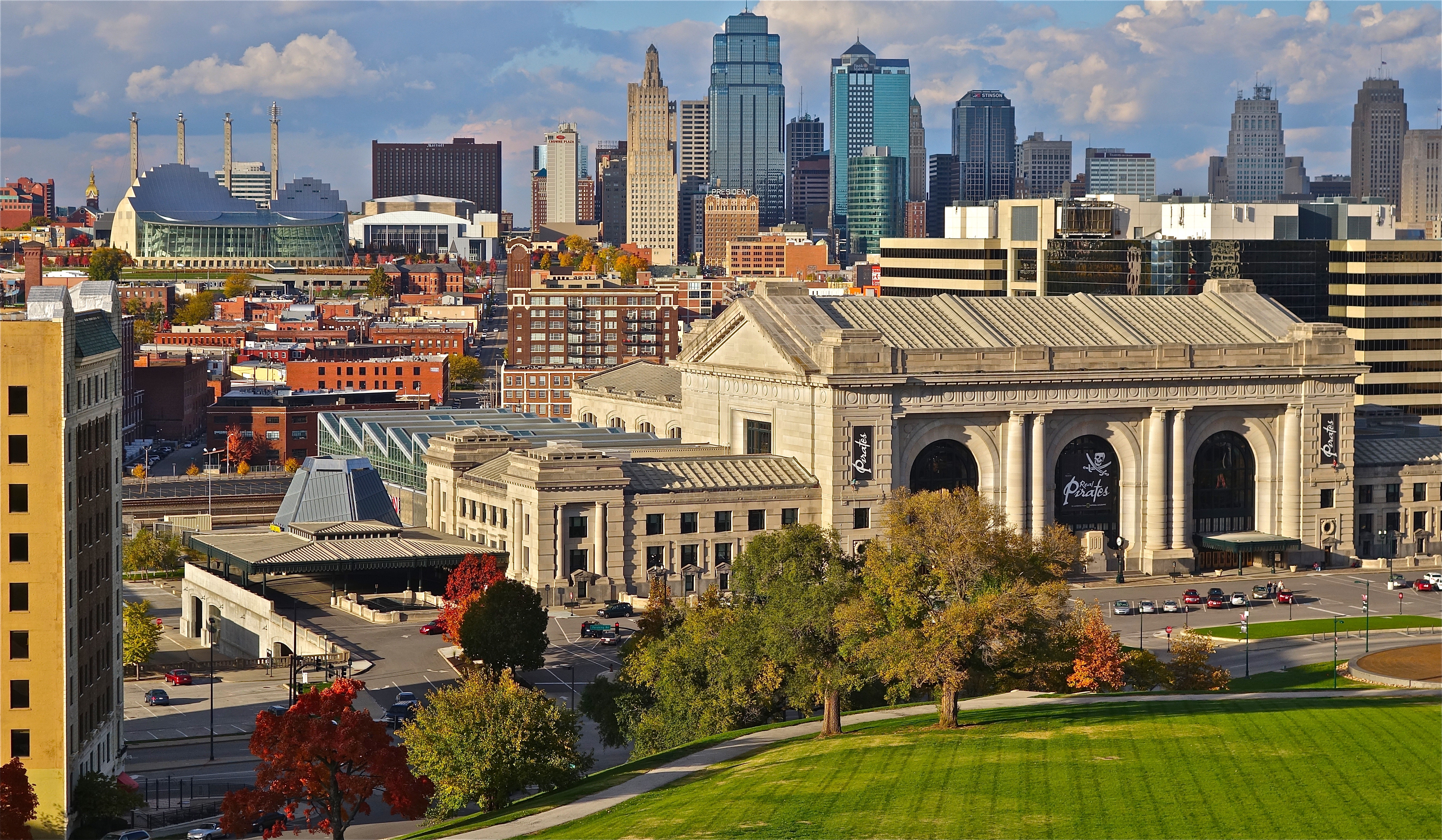
Downtown Kansas City looking over Union Station from the Liberty Memorial

In the 21st century, the Kansas City area has undergone extensive redevelopment, with more than $6 billion in improvements to the downtown area on the Missouri side. One of the main goals is to attract convention and tourist dollars, office workers, and residents to downtown KCMO. Among the projects include the redevelopment of the Power & Light District into a retail and entertainment district; and the Sprint Center, an 18,500-seat arena that opened in 2007, funded by a 2004 ballot initiative involving a tax on car rentals and hotels, designed to meet the stadium specifications for a possible future NBA or NHL franchise, and was renamed T-Mobile Center in 2020; Kemper Arena, which was functionally superseded by Sprint Center, fell into disrepair and was sold to private developers. By 2018, the arena was being converted to a sports complex under the name Hy-Vee Arena. The Kauffman Performing Arts Center opened in 2011 providing a new, modern home to the KC Orchestra and Ballet. In 2015, an 800-room Hyatt Convention Center Hotel was announced for a site next to the Performance Arts Center & Bartle Hall. Construction was scheduled to start in early 2018 with Loews as the operator.

From 2007 to 2017, downtown residential population in Kansas City quadrupled and continues to grow. The area has grown from almost 4,000 residents in the early 2000s to nearly 30,000 as of 2017. Kansas City's downtown ranks as the sixth-fastest-growing downtown in America with the population expected to grow by more than 40% by 2022. Conversions of office buildings such as the Power & Light Building and the Commerce Bank Tower into residential and hotel space has helped to fulfill the demand. New apartment complexes like One, Two, and Three Lights, River Market West, and 503 Main have begun to reshape Kansas City's skyline. Strong demand has led to occupancy rates in the upper 90%.

The residential population of downtown has boomed, and the office population has dropped significantly from the early 2000s to the mid-2010s. Top employers like AMC moved their operations to modern office buildings in the suburbs. High office vacancy plagued downtown, leading to the neglect of many office buildings. By the mid-2010s, many office buildings were converted to residential uses and the Class A vacancy rate plunged to 12% in 2017. Swiss Re, Virgin Mobile, AutoAlert, and others have begun to move operations to downtown Kansas City from the suburbs and expensive coastal cities.

The area has seen additional development through various transportation projects, including improvements to the Grandview Triangle, which intersects Interstates 435 and 470, and U.S. Route 71. In July 2005, the Kansas City Area Transportation Authority (KCATA) launched Kansas City's first bus rapid transit line, the Metro Area Express (MAX), which links the River Market, downtown, Union Station, Crown Center and the Country Club Plaza. The KCATA continues to expand MAX with additional routes on Prospect Avenue, Troost Avenue, and Independence Avenue.

In 2013, construction began on a two-mile streetcar line in downtown Kansas City (funded by a $102 million ballot initiative that was passed in 2012) that runs between the River Market and Union Station, it began operation in May 2016. In 2017, voters approved the formation of a TDD to expand the streetcar line south 3.5 miles from Union Station to UMKC's Volker Campus. Additionally in 2017, the KC Port Authority began engineering studies for a Port Authority funded streetcar expansion north to Berkley Riverfront Park. Citywide, voter support for rail projects continues to grow with numerous light rail projects in the works.

In 2016, Jackson County, Missouri, acquired unused rail lines as part of a long-term commuter rail plan. For the time being, the line is being converted to a trail while county officials negotiate with railroads for access to tracks in downtown Kansas City. On November 7, 2017, Kansas City voters overwhelmingly approved a new single terminal at Kansas City International Airport by a 75% to 25% margin. The new single terminal replaced the three existing "Clover Leafs" at KCI Airport on February 28, 2023.

== Geography ==
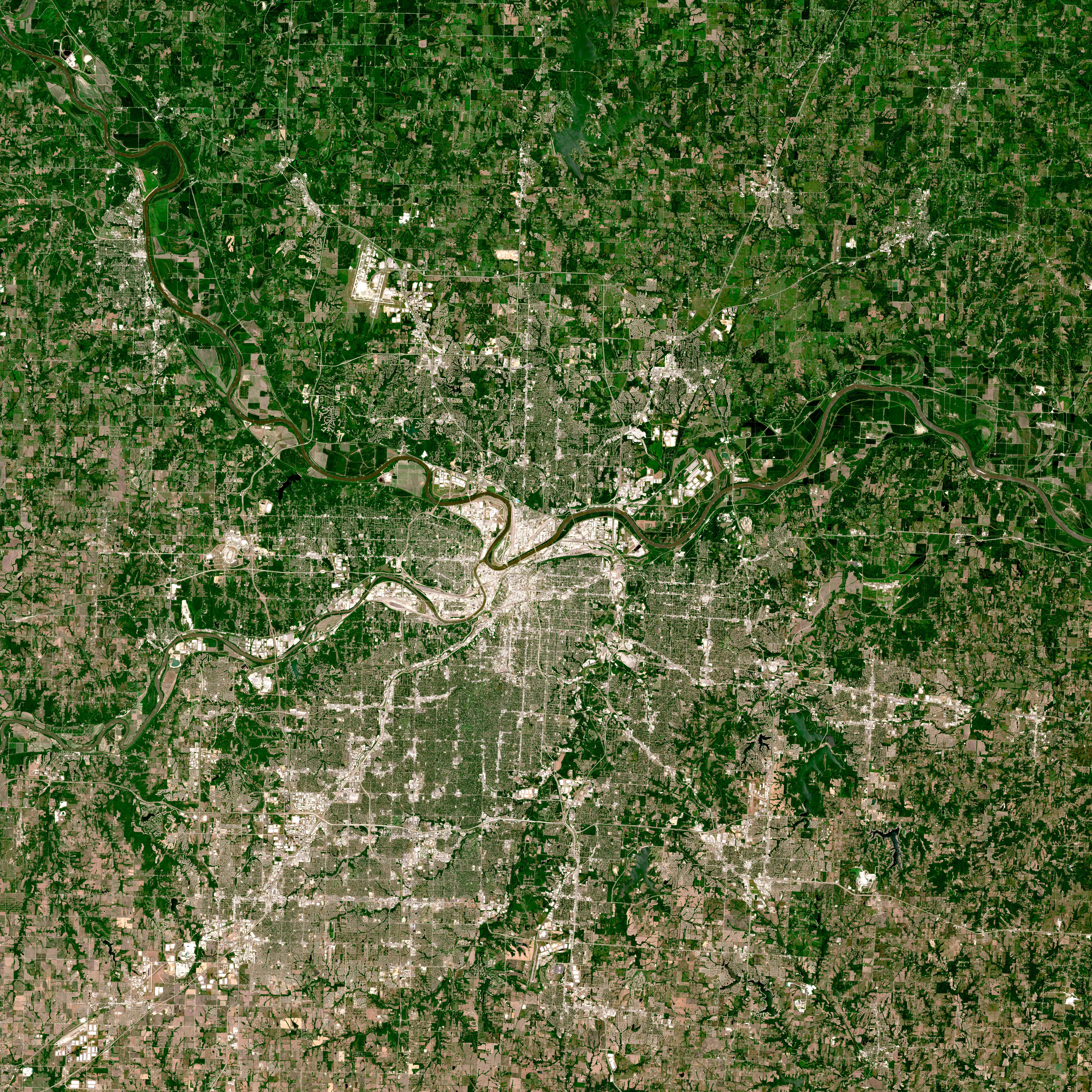
The Kansas City metropolitan area was photographed by the Sentinel-2 satellite in July 2022.

The city has an area of 319.03 square miles (826.28 km^{2}), of which, 314.95 square miles (815.72 km^{2}) is land and 4.08 square miles (10.57 km^{2}) is water. Bluffs overlook the rivers and river bottom areas. Kansas City proper is bowl-shaped and is surrounded to the north and south by glacier-carved limestone and bedrock cliffs. Kansas City is at the confluence between the Dakota and Minnesota ice lobes during the maximum late Independence glaciation of the Pleistocene epoch. The Kansas and Missouri rivers cut wide valleys into the terrain when the glaciers melted and drained. A partially filled spillway valley crosses the central city. This valley is an eastward continuation of the Turkey Creek Valley. It is the closest major city to the geographic center of the contiguous United States, or "Lower 48".

=== Cityscape ===
Kansas City comprises more than 240 neighborhoods, some with histories as independent cities or as the sites of major events.

==== Architecture ====
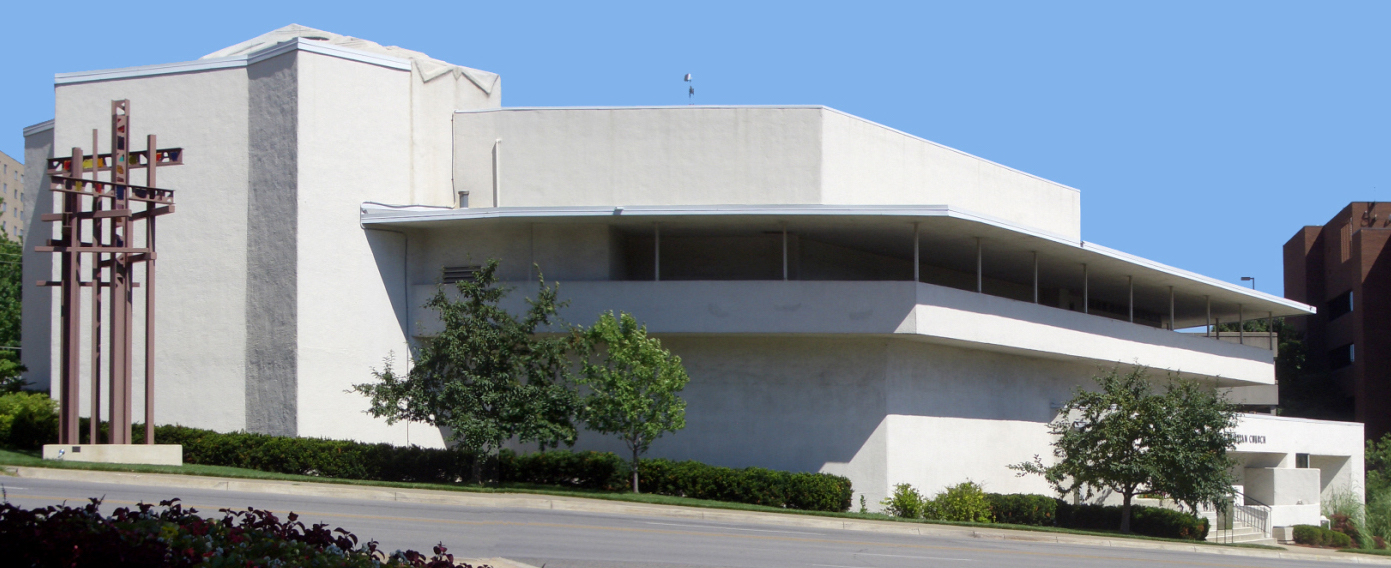
Community Christian Church was designed by Frank Lloyd Wright and is next to the Country Club Plaza.

The Nelson-Atkins Museum of Art opened its Euro-Style Bloch addition in 2007, and the Safdie-designed Kauffman Center for the Performing Arts opened in 2011. The Power and Light Building is influenced by the Art Deco style and sports a glowing sky beacon. The new world headquarters of H&R Block is a 20-story all-glass oval bathed in a soft green light. The four industrial artworks atop the support towers of the Kansas City Convention Center (Bartle Hall) were once the subject of ridicule, but now define the night skyline near the T-Mobile Center along with One Kansas City Place (Missouri's tallest office tower), the KCTV-Tower (Missouri's tallest freestanding structure) and the Liberty Memorial, a World War I memorial and museum that flaunts simulated flames and smoke billowing into the night skyline. It was designated as the National World War I Museum and Memorial in 2004 by the United States Congress. Kansas City is home to significant national and international architecture firms including ACI Boland, BNIM, 360 Architecture, HNTB, Populous. Frank Lloyd Wright designed two private residences and Community Christian Church there.

Kansas City hosts more than 200 working fountains, especially on the Country Club Plaza. Designs range from French-inspired traditional to modern. Highlights include the Black Marble H&R Block fountain in front of Union Station, which features synchronized water jets; the Nichols Bronze Horses at the corner of Main and J.C. Nichols Parkway at the entrance to the Plaza Shopping District; and the fountain at Hallmark Cards World Headquarters in Crown Center.

==== City Market ====
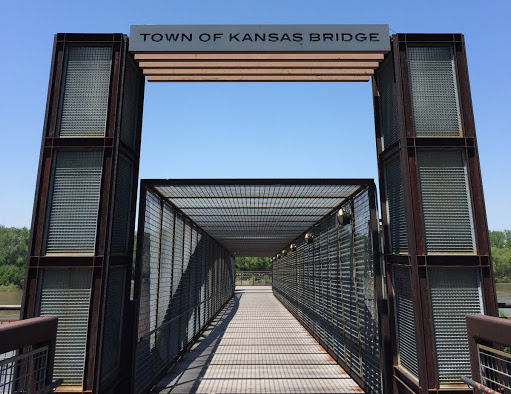
The Town of Kansas Bridge connects pedestrian traffic from the Riverfront Heritage Trail (starting at Berkley Riverfront Park) to River Market.

Since its inception in 1857, City Market has been one of the largest and most enduring public farmers' markets in the American Midwest, linking growers and small businesses to the community. More than 30 full-time merchants operate year-round and offer specialty foods, fresh meats and seafood, restaurants and cafes, floral, and home accessories. The City Market has the Arabia Steamboat Museum, which houses artifacts from a steamboat that sank near Kansas City in 1856.

==== Downtown ====
Downtown Kansas City is 2.9 square miles (7.5 km^{2}) bounded by the Missouri River to the north, 31st Street to the south, Troost Avenue to the east, and State Line Road to the west. Areas near Downtown Kansas City include the 39th Street District, which is known as Restaurant Row, and features one of Kansas City's largest selections of independently owned restaurants and boutique shops. It is a center of literary and visual arts, and bohemian culture. Crown Center is the headquarters of Hallmark Cards and a major downtown shopping and entertainment complex. It is connected to Union Station by a series of covered walkways. The Country Club Plaza, or "the Plaza", is an upscale, outdoor shopping, and entertainment district. It is the first suburban shopping district in the United States, designed to accommodate shoppers arriving by automobile, and is surrounded by apartments and condominiums, including several high rise buildings. The associated Country Club District to the south includes the Sunset Hill and Brookside neighborhoods, and is traversed by Ward Parkway, a landscaped boulevard known for its statuary, fountains, and large, historic homes. Union Station is home to Science City, restaurants, shopping, theaters, and the city's Amtrak facility.

After years of neglect and seas of parking lots, Downtown Kansas City is undergoing a period of change with over $6 billion in development since 2000. Many residential properties recently have been or are under redevelopment in three surrounding warehouse loft districts and the Central Business District. The Power & Light District, a new, nine-block entertainment district comprising numerous restaurants, bars, and retail shops, was developed by the Cordish Company of Baltimore. Its first tenant opened on November 9, 2007. It is anchored by the T-Mobile Center, a 19,000-seat sports and entertainment complex.

=== Climate ===
Kansas City

Climate chart (precipitation, max. and min. temperature)
J	F	M	A	M	J	J	A	S	O	N	D
1 40 22	1.5 45 26	2.1 57 36	3.9 67 46	5.1 76 57	5.3 86 67	4.4 90 72	4.7 89 70	3.8 80 61	3.2 68 49	1.8 55 36	1.3 44 27
- █ Average max. and min. temperatures in °F
- █ Precipitation totals in inches
Metric conversion
J	F	M	A	M	J	J	A	S	O	N	D
25 4 −6	38 7 −3	53 14 2	99 19 8	130 24 14	135 30 19	112 32 22	119 32 21	97 27 16	81 20 9	46 13 2	33 7 −3
- █ Average max. and min. temperatures in °C
- █ Precipitation totals in mm

Kansas City is in the Midwestern United States, near the geographic center of the country, at the confluence of the Missouri and Kansas rivers. The city lies in either the humid continental zone when using the 32 °F (0 °C) isotherm, or in the humid subtropical zone when using the 27 °F (−3 °C) isotherm. The city experiences roughly 104 air frosts on average per annum. The city is part of USDA plant hardiness zones 5b and 6a. In the center of North America, far removed from a significant body of water, there is significant potential for extreme hot and cold swings throughout the year. The warmest month is July, with a 24-hour average temperature of 81.0 °F (27.2 °C). The summer months are hot and humid, with moist air riding up from the Gulf of Mexico, and high temperatures surpass 100 °F (38 °C) on 5.6 days of the year, and 90 °F (32 °C) on 47 days. The coldest month of the year is January, with an average temperature of 31.0 °F (−0.6 °C). Winters are cold, with 22 days where the high temperature is at or below 32 °F (0 °C) and 2.5 nights with a low at or below 0 °F (−18 °C). The official record highest temperature is 113 °F (45 °C), set on August 14, 1936, at Downtown Airport, while the official record lowest is −23 °F (−31 °C), set on December 22 and 23, 1989. Normal seasonal snowfall is 13.4 inches (34 cm) at Downtown Airport and 18.8 in (48 cm) at Kansas City International Airport. The average window for freezing temperatures is October 31 to April 4, while for measurable (0.1 in or 0.25 cm) snowfall, it is November 27 to March 16 as measured at Kansas City International Airport. Precipitation, both in frequency and total accumulation, shows a marked uptick in late spring and summer.

Kansas City is located in Tornado Alley, a broad region where cold air from Canada collides with warm air from the Gulf of Mexico, leading to the formation of powerful storms, especially during the spring. The Kansas City metropolitan area has experienced several significant outbreaks of tornadoes in the past, including the 1957 Ruskin Heights tornado, the 2019 Lawrence–Linwood tornado and the May 2003 tornado outbreak sequence. The region can also experience ice storms during the winter, such as the 2002 ice storm during which hundreds of thousands of residents lost power for days or weeks. Kansas City and its outlying areas are also subject to flooding, including the Great Floods of 1844, 1951, and 1993.

Climate data for Kansas City, Missouri (Downtown Airport), 1991–2020 normals, (Note: Mean monthly maxima and minima (i.e. the expected highest and lowest temperature readings at any point during the year or given month) calculated based on data at said location from 1991 to 2020.) extremes 1934–present)
Month	Jan	Feb	Mar	Apr	May	Jun	Jul	Aug	Sep	Oct	Nov	Dec	Year
Record high °F (°C)	76 (24)	83 (28)	95 (35)	94 (34)	103 (39)	108 (42)	112 (44)	113 (45)	109 (43)	98 (37)	83 (28)	75 (24)	113 (45)
Mean maximum °F (°C)	62.9 (17.2)	68.4 (20.2)	78.6 (25.9)	84.3 (29.1)	90.1 (32.3)	95.4 (35.2)	100.0 (37.8)	99.9 (37.7)	93.8 (34.3)	86.0 (30.0)	73.5 (23.1)	65.2 (18.4)	101.7 (38.7)
Mean daily maximum °F (°C)	39.9 (4.4)	45.1 (7.3)	56.6 (13.7)	66.8 (19.3)	76.2 (24.6)	85.8 (29.9)	90.2 (32.3)	88.6 (31.4)	80.4 (26.9)	68.2 (20.1)	54.5 (12.5)	43.9 (6.6)	66.3 (19.1)
Daily mean °F (°C)	31.0 (−0.6)	35.8 (2.1)	46.4 (8.0)	56.5 (13.6)	66.7 (19.3)	76.5 (24.7)	81.0 (27.2)	79.2 (26.2)	70.7 (21.5)	58.4 (14.7)	45.4 (7.4)	35.3 (1.8)	56.9 (13.8)
Mean daily minimum °F (°C)	22.2 (−5.4)	26.4 (−3.1)	36.2 (2.3)	46.3 (7.9)	57.2 (14.0)	67.2 (19.6)	71.9 (22.2)	69.9 (21.1)	61.0 (16.1)	48.7 (9.3)	36.3 (2.4)	26.7 (−2.9)	47.5 (8.6)
Mean minimum °F (°C)	2.7 (−16.3)	8.4 (−13.1)	16.4 (−8.7)	31.0 (−0.6)	42.6 (5.9)	55.1 (12.8)	62.4 (16.9)	60.1 (15.6)	46.4 (8.0)	32.4 (0.2)	19.7 (−6.8)	8.2 (−13.2)	−0.7 (−18.2)
Record low °F (°C)	−14 (−26)	−13 (−25)	−3 (−19)	16 (−9)	32 (0)	44 (7)	52 (11)	48 (9)	34 (1)	21 (−6)	5 (−15)	−19 (−28)	−19 (−28)
Average precipitation inches (mm)	1.02 (26)	1.53 (39)	2.08 (53)	3.89 (99)	5.10 (130)	5.33 (135)	4.38 (111)	4.68 (119)	3.78 (96)	3.24 (82)	1.80 (46)	1.30 (33)	38.13 (969)
Average snowfall inches (cm)	3.4 (8.6)	3.2 (8.1)	0.4 (1.0)	0.1 (0.25)	0.0 (0.0)	0.0 (0.0)	0.0 (0.0)	0.0 (0.0)	0.0 (0.0)	0.3 (0.76)	0.1 (0.25)	3.5 (8.9)	11.0 (28)
Average precipitation days (≥ 0.01 in)	4.6	4.8	6.8	9.3	11.0	9.5	7.9	7.8	7.6	7.0	5.2	4.6	86.1
Average snowy days (≥ 0.1 in)	2.2	1.6	0.4	0.1	0.0	0.0	0.0	0.0	0.0	0.1	0.1	1.9	6.4
Source: NOAA

Climate data for Kansas City Int'l, Missouri (1991–2020 normals, extremes 1888–present) (Note: Official records for Kansas City kept at downtown/Weather Bureau Office from July 1888 to December 1933; Downtown Airport from January 1934 to September 1972; and Kansas City Int'l since October 1972. For more information see ThreadEx.)
Month	Jan	Feb	Mar	Apr	May	Jun	Jul	Aug	Sep	Oct	Nov	Dec	Year
Record high °F (°C)	75 (24)	83 (28)	93 (34)	95 (35)	103 (39)	108 (42)	112 (44)	113 (45)	109 (43)	98 (37)	83 (28)	74 (23)	113 (45)
Mean maximum °F (°C)	62.0 (16.7)	67.5 (19.7)	78.8 (26.0)	84.5 (29.2)	88.9 (31.6)	93.5 (34.2)	97.9 (36.6)	98.1 (36.7)	92.6 (33.7)	85.9 (29.9)	72.6 (22.6)	64.3 (17.9)	99.7 (37.6)
Mean daily maximum °F (°C)	38.4 (3.6)	43.6 (6.4)	55.4 (13.0)	65.5 (18.6)	75.0 (23.9)	84.2 (29.0)	88.3 (31.3)	87.1 (30.6)	79.2 (26.2)	67.2 (19.6)	53.5 (11.9)	42.3 (5.7)	65.0 (18.3)
Daily mean °F (°C)	29.0 (−1.7)	33.6 (0.9)	44.5 (6.9)	54.6 (12.6)	64.6 (18.1)	74.1 (23.4)	78.2 (25.7)	76.7 (24.8)	68.4 (20.2)	56.4 (13.6)	43.6 (6.4)	33.1 (0.6)	54.7 (12.6)
Mean daily minimum °F (°C)	19.5 (−6.9)	23.6 (−4.7)	33.6 (0.9)	43.7 (6.5)	54.3 (12.4)	64.0 (17.8)	68.1 (20.1)	66.3 (19.1)	57.5 (14.2)	45.6 (7.6)	33.6 (0.9)	23.9 (−4.5)	44.5 (6.9)
Mean minimum °F (°C)	−1.5 (−18.6)	4.3 (−15.4)	13.3 (−10.4)	27.8 (−2.3)	39.4 (4.1)	51.6 (10.9)	58.3 (14.6)	56.0 (13.3)	41.9 (5.5)	28.5 (−1.9)	16.3 (−8.7)	4.4 (−15.3)	−5.2 (−20.7)
Record low °F (°C)	−20 (−29)	−22 (−30)	−10 (−23)	12 (−11)	27 (−3)	42 (6)	51 (11)	43 (6)	31 (−1)	17 (−8)	1 (−17)	−23 (−31)	−23 (−31)
Average precipitation inches (mm)	1.16 (29)	1.48 (38)	2.36 (60)	4.05 (103)	5.32 (135)	5.25 (133)	4.58 (116)	4.24 (108)	4.04 (103)	3.25 (83)	2.00 (51)	1.57 (40)	39.30 (998)
Average snowfall inches (cm)	4.9 (12)	5.9 (15)	1.7 (4.3)	0.3 (0.76)	0.0 (0.0)	0.0 (0.0)	0.0 (0.0)	0.0 (0.0)	0.0 (0.0)	0.3 (0.76)	1.1 (2.8)	4.0 (10)	18.2 (46)
Average extreme snow depth inches (cm)	3.2 (8.1)	3.4 (8.6)	1.9 (4.8)	0.1 (0.25)	0.0 (0.0)	0.0 (0.0)	0.0 (0.0)	0.0 (0.0)	0.0 (0.0)	0.1 (0.25)	0.6 (1.5)	2.4 (6.1)	5.3 (13)
Average precipitation days (≥ 0.01 in)	6.8	6.7	9.5	11.3	12.1	10.2	9.0	8.4	8.3	8.1	6.8	6.5	103.7
Average snowy days (≥ 0.1 in)	4.4	3.1	1.7	0.4	0.0	0.0	0.0	0.0	0.0	0.2	1.0	3.0	13.8
Average relative humidity (%)	68.8	69.6	66.7	62.9	68.0	69.2	67.4	70.0	70.4	67.1	69.7	71.0	68.4
Average dew point °F (°C)	16.5 (−8.6)	21.4 (−5.9)	31.6 (−0.2)	40.6 (4.8)	52.0 (11.1)	61.5 (16.4)	65.8 (18.8)	64.4 (18.0)	56.7 (13.7)	43.5 (6.4)	32.5 (0.3)	21.0 (−6.1)	42.3 (5.7)
Mean monthly sunshine hours	183.7	174.3	223.9	257.8	285.0	305.5	329.3	293.9	240.5	213.6	155.3	147.1	2,809.9
Percentage possible sunshine	61	58	60	65	64	68	74	69	64	62	52	50	63
Average ultraviolet index	2	3	5	7	8	9	10	9	7	4	3	2	6
Source: NOAA (relative humidity, dew point, and sun 1972–1990)

== Demographics ==
Historical population
Census	Pop.	Note	%±
1860	4,418		—
1870	32,260		630.2%
1880	55,785		72.9%
1890	132,716		137.9%
1900	163,752		23.4%
1910	248,381		51.7%
1920	324,410		30.6%
1930	399,746		23.2%
1940	400,178		0.1%
1950	456,622		14.1%
1960	475,539		4.1%
1970	507,087		6.6%
1980	448,159		−11.6%
1990	435,146		−2.9%
2000	441,545		1.5%
2010	459,787		4.1%
2020	508,090		10.5%
2025 (est.)	521,220	▲	2.6%
U.S. Decennial Census; 2010–2020

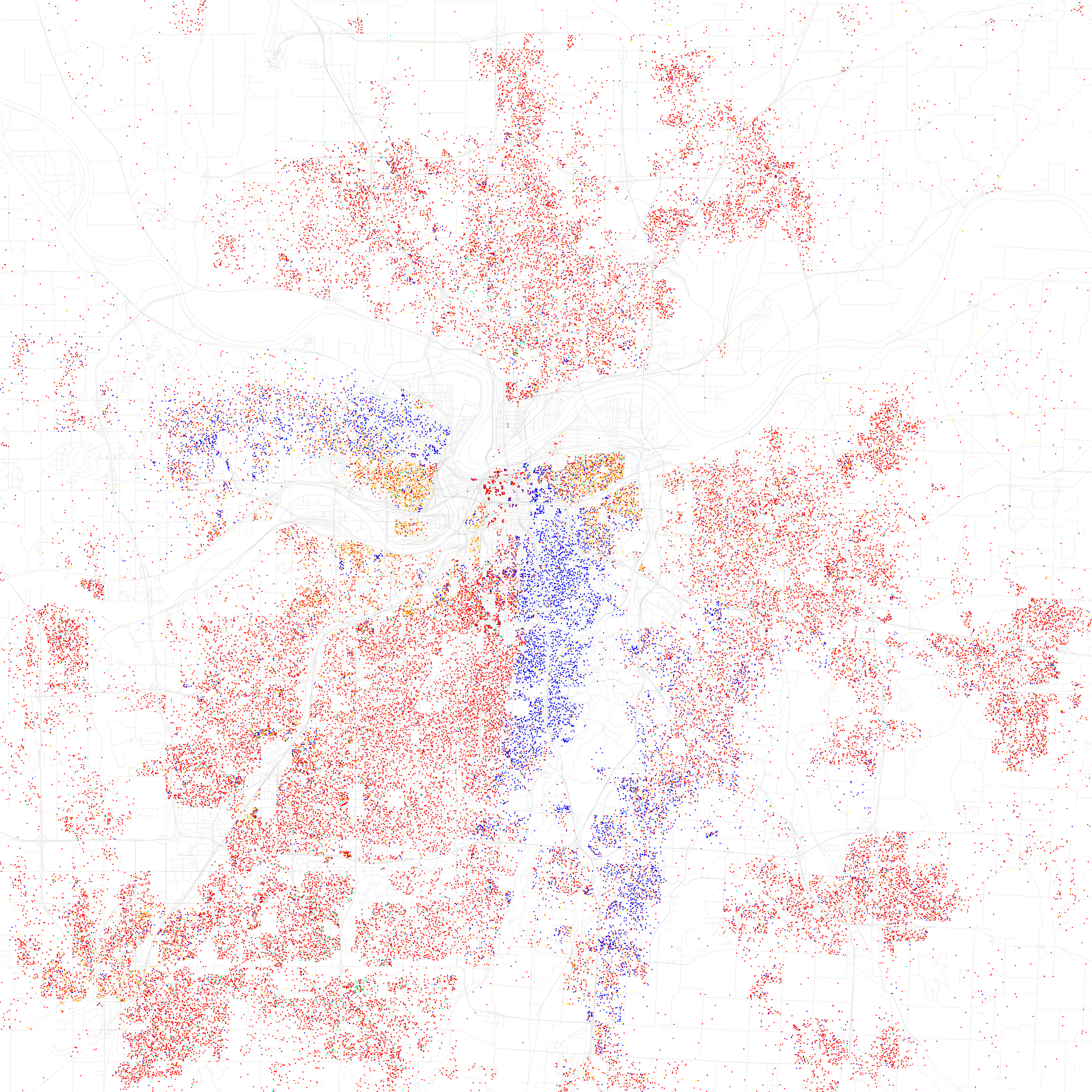
Map of racial distribution in Kansas City, 2010 U.S. Census. Each dot is 25 people: ⬤ White ⬤ Black ⬤ Asian ⬤ Hispanic ⬤ Other

The Latino/Hispanic population of Kansas City, which is heavily Mexican and Central American, is spread throughout the metropolitan area, with some concentration in the northeast part of the city and southwest of downtown. The Asian population, mostly Southeast Asian, is partly concentrated within the northeast side to the Columbus Park neighborhood in the Greater Downtown area, a historically Italian American neighborhood, the UMKC area and in River Market, in northern Kansas City.

The historic (pre-World War II) city of Kansas City contains roughly 58 square miles (150 km^{2}) and has a population density of about 5,000 inhabitants per square mile (1,900/km^{2}). Its borders are the Missouri River on the north (save for a small community named Harlem and Charles B. Wheeler Downtown Airport on the river's north bank), 79th Street on the south, the Blue River on the east, and State Line Road on the west. From the 1950s to the 1970s, Kansas City annexed large amounts of land, most of which remain largely undeveloped.

Between the 2000 and 2010 census counts, the urban core of Kansas City continued to drop significantly in population. The areas of Greater Downtown in the center city, and sections near I-435 and I-470 in the south, and Highway 152 in the north are the only areas of Kansas City, Missouri, to have an increase in population, with the Northland population growing the most. Even so, the population of Kansas City as a whole from 2000 to 2010 increased by 4.1%.

Historical racial composition	2020	2010	1990	1970	1940
White	59.7%	59.2%	66.8%	77.2%	89.5%
Black or African American	26.5%	29.9%	29.6%	22.1%	10.4%
Hispanic or Latino (of any race)	10.7%	10.0%	3.9%	2.7% (Note: From 15% sample)	N/A
Two or more races	6.3%	3.2%	N/A	N/A	N/A
Asian	2.7%	2.5%	N/A	N/A	N/A
American Indian and Alaska Natives	0.4%	0.5%	N/A	N/A	N/A
Native Hawaiian and Other Pacific Islander	0.3%	0.2%	N/A	N/A	N/A

In February 2022, the city had an estimated 3,000 homeless people.

Kansas City, Missouri – Racial and ethnic composition Note: the US Census treats Hispanic/Latino as an ethnic category. This table excludes Latinos from the racial categories and assigns them to a separate category. Hispanics/Latinos may be of any race.
Race / Ethnicity (NH = Non-Hispanic)	Pop 1980	Pop 1990	Pop 2000	Pop 2010	Pop 2020	% 1980	% 1990	% 2000	% 2010	% 2020
White alone (NH)	305,176	282,730	254,471	252,257	268,273	68.10%	64.97%	57.63%	54.86%	52.80%
Black or African American alone (NH)	122,018	128,003	136,921	135,916	130,983	27.23%	29.42%	31.01%	29.56%	25.78%
Native American or Alaska Native alone (NH)	1,622	1,960	1,784	1,823	1,854	0.36%	0.45%	0.40%	0.40%	0.36%
Asian alone (NH)	3,499	4,978	8,100	11,275	15,793	0.78%	1.14%	1.83%	2.45%	3.11%
Native Hawaiian or Pacific Islander alone (NH)	x	x	442	787	1,456	x	x	0.10%	0.17%	0.29%
Other race alone (NH)	1,141	458	757	709	2,366	0.25%	0.11%	0.17%	0.15%	0.47%
Mixed race or Multiracial (NH)	x	x	8,466	11,067	26,396	x	x	1.92%	2.41%	5.20%
Hispanic or Latino (any race)	14,703	17,017	30,604	45,953	60,969	3.28%	3.91%	6.93%	9.99%	12.00%
Total	448,159	435,146	441,545	459,787	508,090	100.00%	100.00%	100.00%	100.00%	100.00%

The racial makeup (including Hispanics in the racial counts) was 55.30% (280,985) White alone, 26.10% (132,617) Black alone, 0.63% (3,221) Native American alone, 3.14% (15,966) Asian alone, 0.30% (1,501) Pacific Islander alone, 5.52% (28,063) other race alone, and 9.00% (45,737) Multiracial or Mixed Race.

The racial and ethnic makeup (where Hispanics are excluded from the racial counts and placed in their own category) was 52.80% (268,273) White alone (non-Hispanic), 25.78% (130,983) Black alone (non-Hispanic), 0.36% (1,854) Native Americans alone (non-Hispanic), 3.11% (15,793) Asian alone (non-Hispanic), 0.29% (1,456) Pacific Islander alone (non-Hispanic), 0.47% (2,366) other race alone (non-Hispanic), 5.20% (26,396) Multiracial or Mixed Race (non-Hispanic), and 12.00% (60,969) Hispanic or Latino.

=== Irish-American community ===
In 2021, the US Census Bureau estimated 253,040 people of Irish descent in the metro, with 123,934 in Jackson, Clay, and Platte Counties. The Irish were the first large immigrant group to settle in Kansas City following the lead of Fr. Bernard Donnelly (c. 1800–1880) and founded its first newspaper. The Irish community includes bands, dancers, Irish stores, newspapers, and the Kansas City Irish Center at Drexel Hall in Midtown. The first book detailing Irish history in Kansas City is Missouri Irish: Irish Settlers on the American Frontier, published in 1984. The Kansas City Irish Fest is held over Labor Day weekend in Crown Center and Washington Park.

=== Religion ===
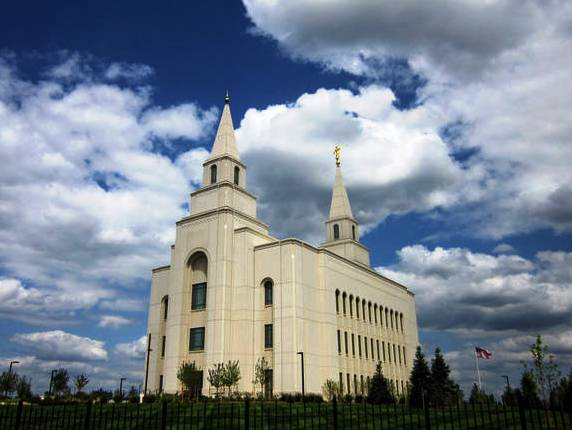
Kansas City Missouri Temple

50.75% of Kansas City area residents have a known religious affiliation. The most common religious denominations in the area are:

- None/no affiliation 49.25%
- Catholic 13.2%
- Baptists 10.4%
- Other Christian 10.3%
- Methodist 6.0%
- Pentecostal 2.7%
- Latter-day Saint 2.5%
- Lutheran 2.3%
- Presbyterian 1.7%
- Judaism 0.4%
- Eastern religions 0.4%
- Islam 0.4%

== Economy ==
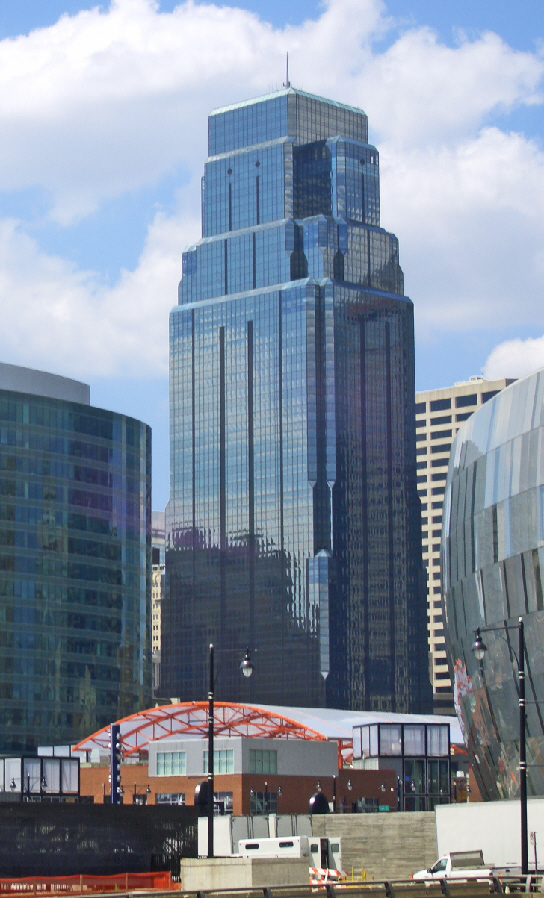
One Kansas City Place is the tallest building in Missouri.

The federal government is the largest employer in the Kansas City metro area, with more than 146 agencies. Kansas City is one of ten regional office cities for the US government. The Internal Revenue Service maintains a large service center in Kansas City that occupies nearly 1.4 million square feet (130,000 m^{2}). It is one of only two sites to process paper returns. The IRS has approximately 2,700 full-time employees in Kansas City, growing to 4,000 during tax season.

The General Services Administration has more than 800 employees. Most are at the Bannister Federal Complex in South Kansas City. The Bannister Complex housed the Kansas City Plant, which is a National Nuclear Security Administration facility operated by Honeywell. The Kansas City Plant has since been moved to a new location on Botts Road. Honeywell employs nearly 2,700 at the Kansas City Plant, which produces and assembles 85% of the non-nuclear components of the United States nuclear bomb arsenal. The Social Security Administration has more than 1,700 employees in the metro, with more than 1,200 at its downtown Mid-America Program Service Center (MAMPSC).

The Kansas City Federal Reserve Bank opened a new building in 2008 near Union Station. Missouri is the only state to have two of the 12 Federal Reserve Bank headquarters, with the second in St. Louis. Kansas City's effort to get the bank was helped by former mayor James A. Reed, who as senator, broke a tie to pass the Federal Reserve Act.

One of the largest US drug manufacturing plants is the Sanofi-Aventis plant in south Kansas City on a campus developed by Ewing Kauffman's Marion Laboratories. It has been developing academic and economic institutions related to animal health sciences, with Manhattan, Kansas at one end of the Kansas City Animal Health Corridor, and Kansas City hosting the National Bio and Agro-Defense Facility which researches animal diseases. The Stowers Institute for Medical Research engages in medical basic science research, working with Open University and University of Kansas Medical Center in a joint Interdisciplinary Graduate Program in Biomedical Science (IGPBS).

Agriculture companies include Dairy Farmers of America, the largest dairy co-op in the United States. The National Association of Intercollegiate Athletics and The National Association of Basketball Coaches are based in Kansas City. The national headquarters for the Veterans of Foreign Wars is located just south of Downtown. Three international law firms, Lathrop & Gage, Stinson Leonard Street, and Shook, Hardy & Bacon are based in the city.

With a Gross Metropolitan Product of $41.68 billion in 2004, Kansas City's (Missouri side only) economy makes up 20.5% of Missouri's gross state product. In 2014, Kansas City was ranked #6 for real estate investment.

In 2022, the city had an estimated 3,000 homeless people, addressed by the Zero KC initiative.

=== Headquarters ===
The following companies are headquartered in Kansas City, Missouri:

- American Century Investments
- Andrews McMeel Universal
- Applebee's (former)
- Barkley Inc.
- Bernstein-Rein
- Blue Cross and Blue Shield of Kansas City
- BNIM
- Boulevard Brewing Company
- Burns & McDonnell
- Children International
- Commerce Bancshares
- Copaken, White & Blitt
- Evergy, formerly Great Plains Energy
- Freightquote.com
- Garney Holding Company
- H&R Block
- Hallmark Cards
- HNTB
- Hostess Brands
- J. E. Dunn Construction Group
- JHS Pedals
- Kansas City Southern Railway
- Lockton Companies
- MANICA Architecture
- Novastar Financial
- Populous
- Russell Stover Candies
- Smith Electric Vehicles
- UMB Financial Corporation
- Veterans of Foreign Wars
- Walton Construction

=== Top employers ===
According to the city's Annual Comprehensive Financial Report for the fiscal year ending April 30, 2024, the top ten principal employers are as follows:

Rank	Employer	Employees	Percentage of total employment
1.	Public school districts/systems	47,161	4.15%
2.	Federal government	38,651	3.40%
3.	State/county governments/city government	29,317	2.58%
4.	University of Kansas Hospital	14,763	1.30%
5.	HCA Midwest Health System	10,051	0.88%
6.	Saint Luke's Health System	9,976	0.88%
7.	Ford Motor Co. Kansas City Assembly Plant	9,021	0.79%
8.	Children's Mercy	7,688	0.68%
9.	Honeywell Federal Manufacturing	6,637	0.58%
10.	Oracle Cerner	6,400	0.56%

== Culture ==
=== Nicknames ===
Kansas City, Missouri is abbreviated as KCMO and the metropolitan area as KC. Residents are Kansas Citians. It is officially nicknamed the City of Fountains. The fountains at Kauffman Stadium, commissioned by original Kansas City Royals owner Ewing Kauffman, are the largest privately funded fountains in the world. In 2018, UNESCO designated Kansas City its first City of Music in the US, in "recognition of [Kansas City's] investment and commitment to music, arts, and creativity as a driver of urban economic development". The city has more boulevards than any other city except Paris and has been called Paris of the Plains. Soccer's popularity, and Sporting Park's popularity as a home stadium for the U.S. Men's National Team, led to the appellation Soccer Capital of America. The city is called the Heart of America, in proximity to the population center of the United States and the geographic center of the 48 contiguous states.

=== Points of interest ===
Name	Description	Photo
Country Club Plaza District	This district was developed in 1922 featuring Spanish-styled architecture and upscale shops and restaurants. Nearby are the University of Missouri–Kansas City, the Kansas City Art Institute, the Kemper Museum of Contemporary Art, and the Nelson-Atkins Museum of Art.	
18th and Vine	Home of distinctive Kansas City jazz, the Negro Leagues Baseball Museum, the American Jazz Museum, and the future home of the MLB Urban Youth Academy. Several jazz clubs and venues include the Gem Theater and the Blue Room.	
Crossroads Arts District	Home to several restaurants, art galleries, and hotels. First Friday is a monthly event with pop-up galleries, food trucks, venue deals, and music events. Union Station and the Kauffman Center are here. Union Station has varying exhibits, including at Science City.	
Westport District	Originally a separate town until annexed by Kansas City, it contains several restaurants, shops, and nightlife options. Along with the Power and Light District, it is one of the city's main entertainment areas. The University of Kansas Hospital is close to the district, just across State Line Road.	
Power and Light District	A new shopping and entertainment district within the Central Business District, it was developed by the Cordish Companies. The T-Mobile Center is a major anchor and the Midland Theatre is a concert venue.	
River Market District/ Berkley Riverfront Park	Kansas City's original neighborhood on the Missouri River contains one of the country's largest and longest lasting public farmers' markets in the nation, and the Steamboat Arabia Museum. The new streetcar line's northernmost loop through the River Market with three stops around City Market. Pedestrians can take the Town of Kansas Bridge connection to the Riverfront Heritage Trail to Berkley Riverfront Park, which is operated by Port KC.	
Crown Center	Developed by Hallmark, it is a short walk from the National World War I Museum and Memorial (Liberty Memorial).	
West Bottoms	The West Bottoms originated primarily as stockyards and for industrial uses, but is slowly being revitalized with apartments and shops. It has Kemper Arena.	
Kansas City, North	Several attractions are north of the Missouri River. Zona Rosa is a mixed-used development with shopping, dining, and events. The Charles B. Wheeler Downtown Airport features the Aviation History Museum. Worlds of Fun and Oceans of Fun are major amusement parks of the midwest.	
Swope Park	Swope Park has 1,805 acres (730 ha), a larger total space than Central Park, with several attractions including the Kansas City Zoo and Starlight Theatre is the second largest outdoor musical theatre venue in the U.S. Sporting Kansas City practice at the soccer complex.	

=== Cuisine ===
Kansas City is famous for its steak and Kansas City–style barbecue. During the heyday of the Kansas City Stockyards, the city was known for its Kansas City steaks or Kansas City strip steaks. The most famous of its steakhouses is the Golden Ox in the Kansas City Live Stock Exchange in the West Bottoms stockyards. These stockyards were second only to those of Chicago in size, but they never recovered from the Great Flood of 1951 and eventually closed. Jess & Jim's Steakhouse was founded in 1938 in the Martin City neighborhood.

The Kansas City Strip cut of steak is similar to the New York Strip cut, and is sometimes referred to just as a strip steak. Along with Texas, Memphis, North Carolina, and South Carolina, Kansas City is lauded as a "world capital of barbecue". More than 90 barbecue restaurants operate in the metropolitan area. The American Royal each fall hosts what it claims is the world's biggest barbecue contest.

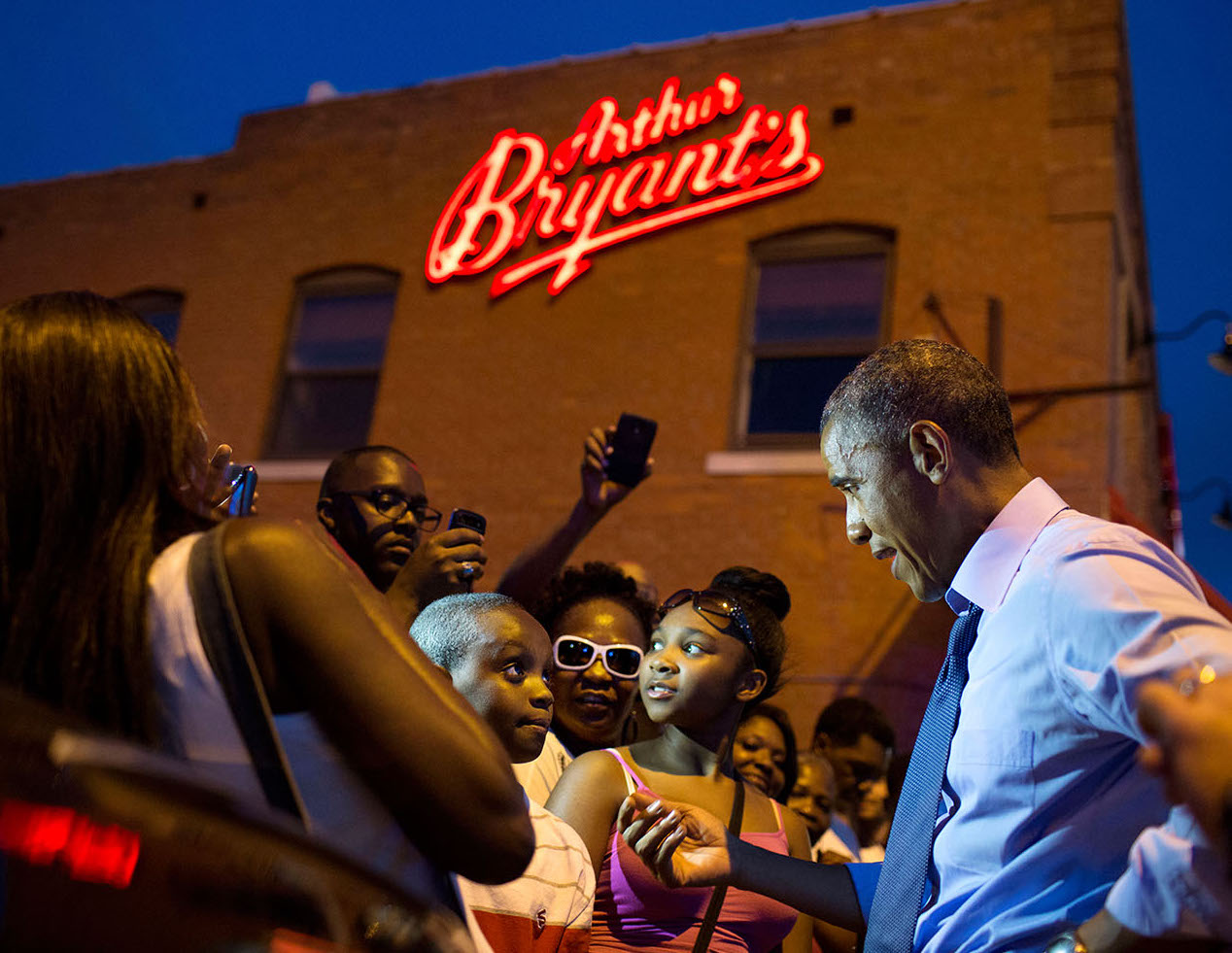
President Obama visits Arthur Bryant's barbecue

Classic Kansas City–style barbecue was an inner-city phenomenon that evolved from the pit of Henry Perry, a migrant from Memphis who is generally credited with opening the city's first barbecue stand in 1921, and blossomed in the 18th and Vine neighborhood. Arthur Bryant's took over the Perry restaurant and added sugar to his sauce to sweeten the recipe a bit. In 1946 one of Perry's cooks, George W. Gates, opened Gates Bar-B-Q, later Gates and Sons Bar-B-Q when his son Ollie joined the family business. Bryant's and Gates are the two definitive Kansas City barbecue restaurants; native Kansas Citian and essayist Calvin Trillin famously called Bryant's "the single best restaurant in the world" in an essay he wrote for Playboy magazine in the 1960s. Fiorella's Jack Stack Barbecue is also well regarded. In 1977, Rich Davis, a psychiatrist, test-marketed his own concoction called K.C. Soul Style Barbecue Sauce. He renamed it KC Masterpiece, and in 1986, he sold the recipe to the Kingsford division of Clorox. Davis retained rights to operate restaurants using the name and sauce, whose recipe popularized the use of molasses as a sweetener in Kansas City–style barbecue sauces.

Kansas City has several James Beard Award-winning/nominated chefs and restaurants. Winning chefs include Michael Smith, Celina Tio, Colby Garrelts, Debbie Gold, Jonathan Justus and Martin Heuser. A majority of the Beard Award-winning restaurants are in the Crossroads district, downtown and in Westport.

=== Casinos ===
Missouri voters approved riverboat casino gaming on the Missouri and Mississippi Rivers by referendum with a 63% majority on November 3, 1992. The first casino facility in the state opened in September 1994 in North Kansas City by Harrah's Entertainment (now Caesar's Entertainment). The combined revenues for four casinos exceeded $153 million per month in May 2008. The metropolitan area is home to six casinos: Ameristar Kansas City, Argosy Kansas City, Harrah's North Kansas City, Isle of Capri Kansas City, the 7th Street Casino (which opened in Kansas City, Kansas, in 2008) and Hollywood Casino (which opened in February 2012 in Kansas City, Kansas).

=== Jazz ===
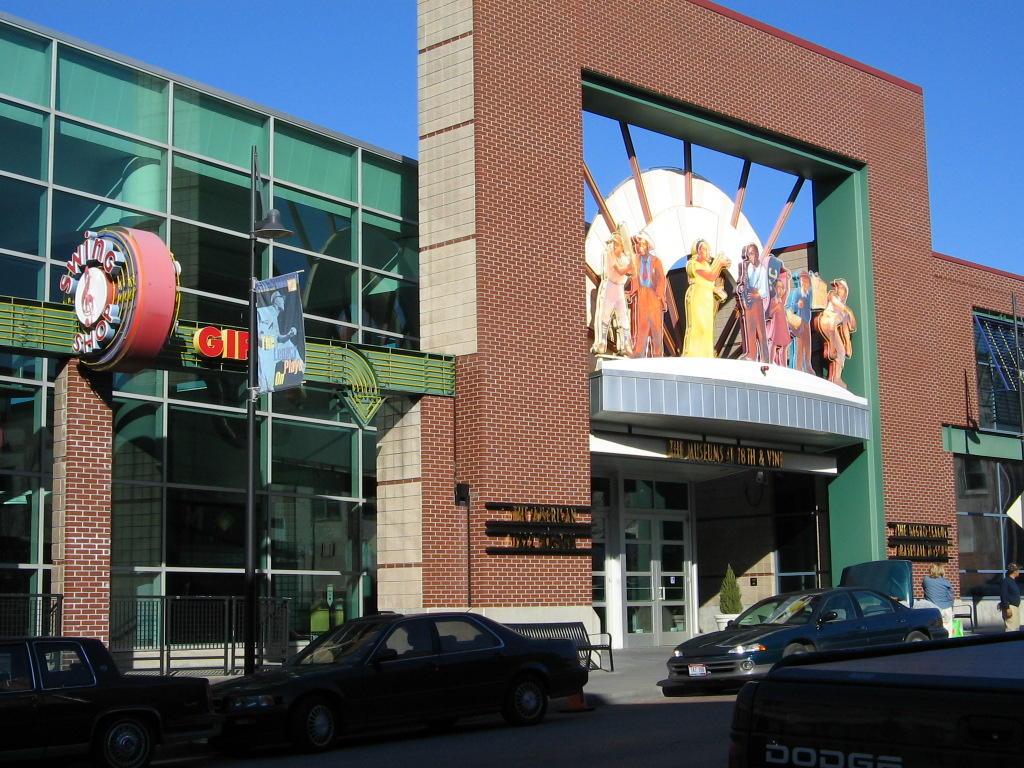
Entrance of the American Jazz Museum

Kansas City jazz in the 1930s marked the transition from big bands to the bebop influence of the 1940s. The 1979 documentary The Last of the Blue Devils portrays this era in interviews and performances by local jazz notables. In the 1970s, Kansas City attempted to resurrect the glory of the jazz era in a family-friendly atmosphere. In the 1970s, an effort to open jazz clubs in the River Quay area of City Market along the Missouri ended in a gang war. Three of the new clubs were blown up in what ultimately ended Kansas City mob influence in Las Vegas casinos. The annual Kansas City Blues and Jazz Festival attracts top jazz stars and large tourist audiences. In 2007 it was rated Kansas City's "best festival" by The Pitch.

Live music venues are throughout the city, with the highest concentration in the Westport entertainment district centered on Broadway and Westport Road near Country Club Plaza, and the 18th and Vine neighborhood's flourish for jazz music. A variety of music genres are performed or have originated there, including musicians Janelle Monáe, Puddle of Mudd, Isaac James, The Get Up Kids, Shiner, Flee The Seen, The Life and Times, Reggie and the Full Effect, Coalesce, The Casket Lottery, The Gadjits, The Rainmakers, Vedera, The Elders, Blackpool Lights, The Republic Tigers, Tech N9ne, Krizz Kaliko, Kutt Calhoun, Skatterman & Snug Brim, Mac Lethal, Ces Cru, and Solè. Kansas City Jazz Orchestra is big band style.

In 2018, UNESCO named Kansas City a City of Music, as the only one in the United States. The designation is based on the city's rich musical heritage, and its $7 million budget for improving the 18th and Vine Jazz District in 2016.

=== Performing arts ===
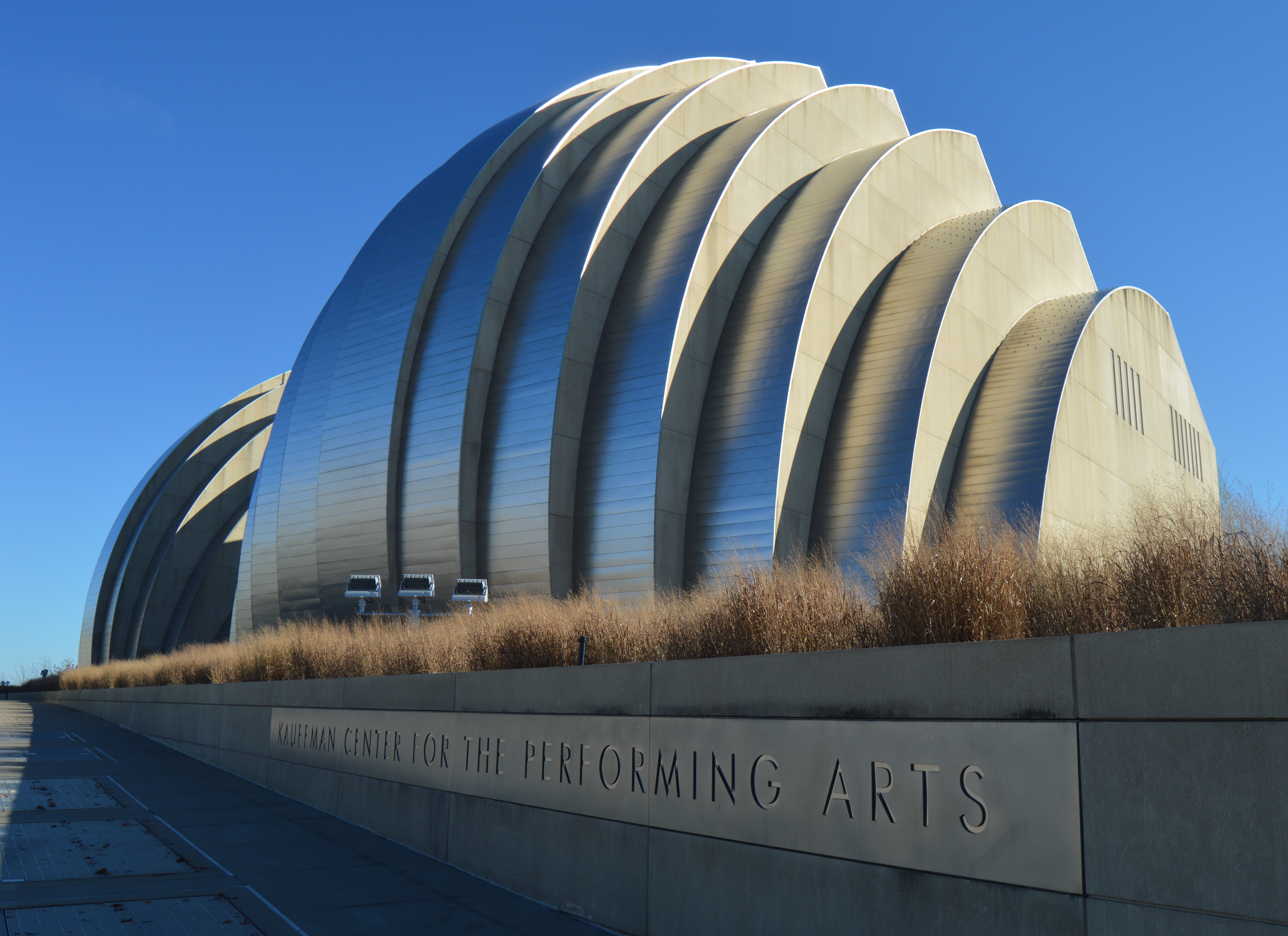
Kauffman Center for the Performing Arts

In 1886, Kansas City had only two theaters when David Austin Latchaw, originally from rural Pennsylvania, moved there. Latchaw maintained friendly relations with several actors such as Otis Skinner, Richard Mansfield, Maude Adams, Margaret Anglin, John Drew, Minnie Maddern Fiske, Julia Marlowe, E. H. Sothern, and Robert Mantell.

Theater troupes in the 1870s toured the state, performing in cities or small towns forming along the railroad lines. Rail transport had enhanced the theater troupe tour market, by allowing full costumes, props, and sets. As theater grew in popularity after the mid-1880s, that number increased and by 1912, ten new theaters had been built in Kansas City. By the 1920s, Kansas City was the center of the vaudevillian Orpheum circuit.

The Kansas City Repertory Theatre is the metro's top professional theatre company. The Starlight Theatre is an 8,105-seat outdoor theatre designed by Edward Delk. The Kansas City Symphony was founded by R. Crosby Kemper Jr. in 1982 to replace the defunct Kansas City Philharmonic, which was founded in 1933. The symphony performs at the Kauffman Center for the Performing Arts. Matthias Pintscher is the symphony's music director and lead conductor. Lyric Opera of Kansas City, founded in 1958, performs at the Kauffman Center, offers one American contemporary opera production during its season, consisting of either four or five productions. The Civic Opera Theater of Kansas City performs at the downtown Folly Theater and at the UMKC Performing Arts Center. Every summer from mid-June to early July, The Heart of America Shakespeare Festival performs at Southmoreland Park near the Nelson-Atkins Museum; the festival was founded by Marilyn Strauss in 1993.

The Kansas City Ballet, founded in 1957 by Tatiana Dokoudovska, is a ballet troupe comprising 25 professional dancers and apprentices. Between 1986 and 2000, it combined with Dance St. Louis to form the State Ballet of Missouri, although it remained in Kansas City. From 1980 to 1995, the Ballet was run by dancer and choreographer Todd Bolender. The Ballet offers an annual repertory split into three seasons, performing classical to contemporary ballets. The Ballet also performs at the Kauffman Center. The Kansas City Chorale is a professional 24-voice chorus with an annual concert series and a concert in Phoenix each year with sister choir the Phoenix Chorale. The Chorale has made several recordings, including with the Phoenix Chorale.

== Sports ==
Professional sports teams in Kansas City include the Kansas City Chiefs in the National Football League (NFL), the Kansas City Royals in Major League Baseball (MLB) and Sporting Kansas City in Major League Soccer (MLS).

The following table lists the professional teams in the Kansas City metropolitan area:

Club	Sport	Founded	League	Venue
Kansas City Chiefs	Football	1960 (as the Dallas Texans); 1963 (as Kansas City Chiefs)	National Football League	Arrowhead Stadium
Kansas City Royals	Baseball	1969	Major League Baseball	Kauffman Stadium
Sporting Kansas City	Soccer	1996	Major League Soccer	Sporting Park (Kansas City, Kansas)
Kansas City Current	Soccer	2018 (as Utah Royals FC) 2021 (as KC NWSL)	National Women's Soccer League	CPKC Stadium
Kansas City Comets	Indoor soccer	2010	Major Arena Soccer League	Cable Dahmer Arena (Independence)
Kansas City Mavericks	Hockey	2009	ECHL	Cable Dahmer Arena (Independence)
Kansas City Monarchs	Baseball	1993 (as the Duluth-Superior Dukes) 2003 (as the Kansas City T-Bones)	American Association	Legends Field
Sporting Kansas City II	Soccer	2016	MLS Next Pro	Sporting Park (Kansas City, Kansas)

=== Professional sports ===
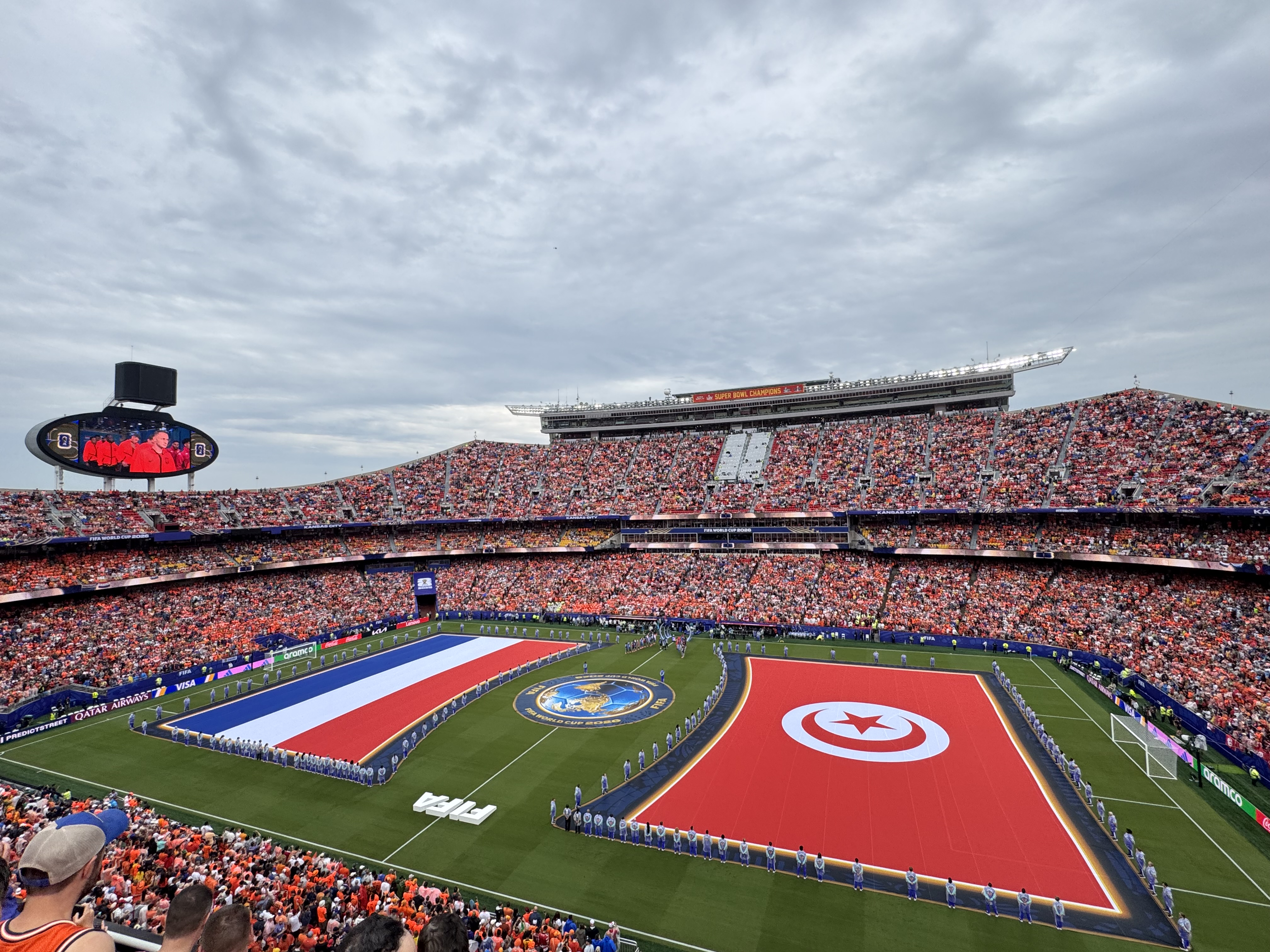
Inside Arrowhead Stadium prior to a match between the Netherlands and Tunisia at the 2026 FIFA World Cup

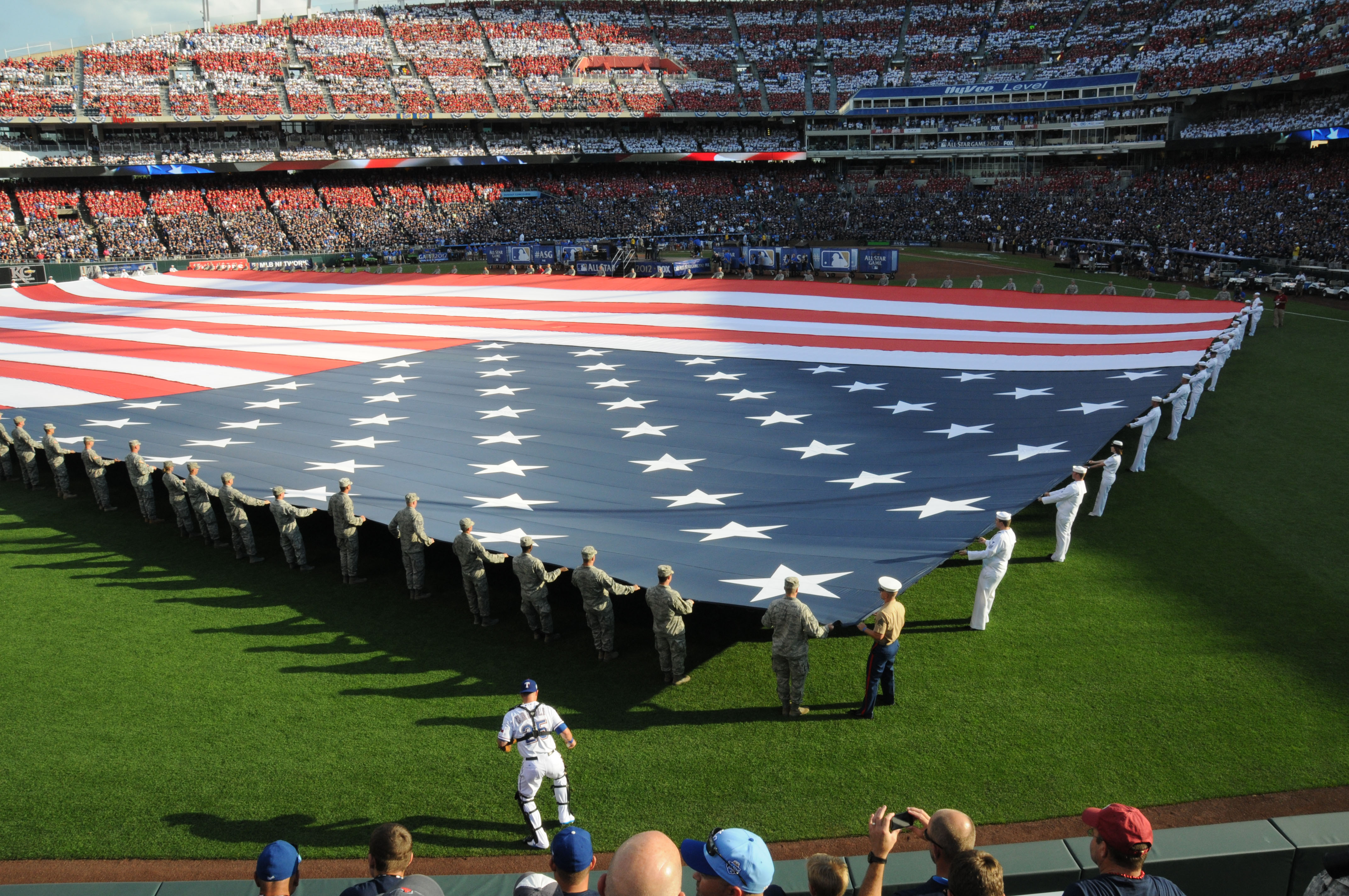
The 2012 Major League Baseball All-Star Game at Kauffman Stadium

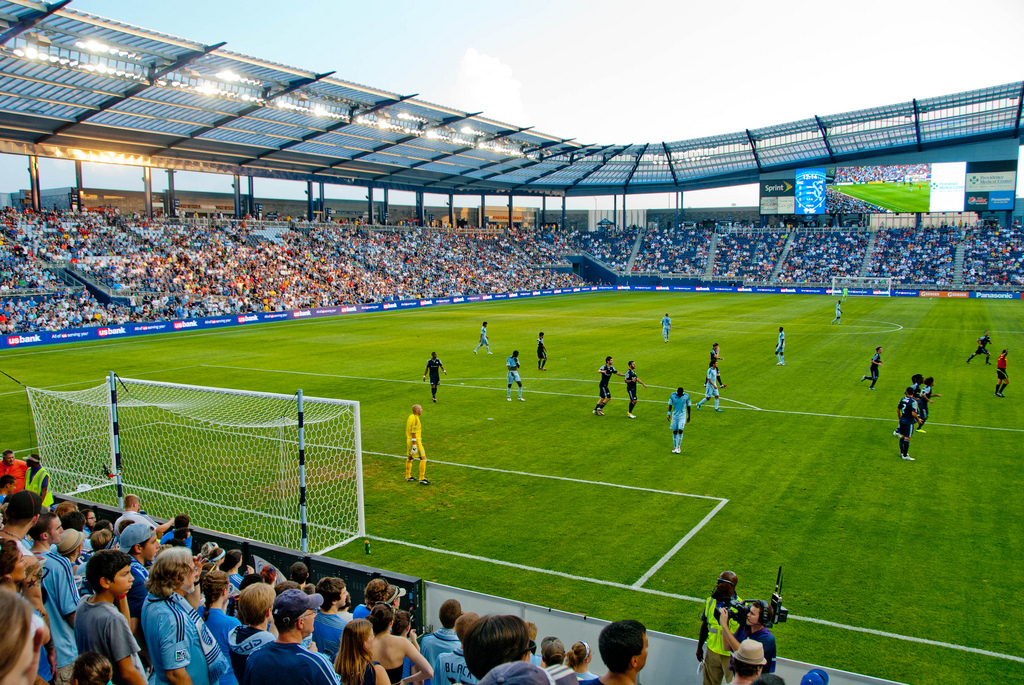
A Sporting KC game at Sporting Park

The Chiefs, now a member of the NFL's American Football Conference, started play in 1960 as the Dallas Texans of the American Football League before moving to Kansas City in 1963. The Chiefs lost Super Bowl I to the Green Bay Packers by a score of 35–10. In 1969, the team became the last AFL champion and won Super Bowl IV. In 2020, they won Super Bowl LIV, in 2023, they won Super Bowl LVII, and in 2024 they won Super Bowl LVIII.

The Athletics baseball franchise played in the city from 1955, after moving from Philadelphia, to 1967, when the team relocated to Oakland, California. The city's current Major League Baseball franchise, the Royals, started play in 1969, and are the only major league sports franchise in Kansas City that has not relocated or changed its name. The Royals were the first American League expansion team to reach the playoffs (in 1976) to reach the World Series (in 1980) and to win the World Series (in 1985). The Royals returned to the World Series in 2014 and won in 2015.

The Kansas City Monarchs, formerly the Kansas City T-Bones, is an unaffiliated minor league team. It played in the independent Northern League from 2003 until 2010 and has been part of the independent American Association since 2011. Its home is Legends Field in Kansas City, Kansas.

The Kansas City Wiz became a charter member of Major League Soccer in 1996. It was renamed the Kansas City Wizards in 1997. In 2011, the team was renamed Sporting Kansas City and moved to its new stadium Sporting Park in Kansas City, Kansas. It won the MLS Cup twice, the Supporters' Shield once, and the US Open Cup four times.

FC Kansas City played from 2013 to 2017 in the National Women's Soccer League; the team's home games were held at Swope Soccer Village. They won the NWSL in 2014 and 2015. The team folded after the 2017 season and its assets were transferred to Utah Royals FC. After the 2020 season, the Utah Royals folded and its assets were transferred to a new Kansas City team, now known as the Kansas City Current. The Current moved to Children's Mercy Park after spending their first season at Legends Field, where they were known as KC NWSL. On October 6, 2022, the team's ownership broke ground on an 11,500-seat soccer-specific stadium called CPKC Stadium on the Berkley Riverfront Park, which opened by March 2024.

Kansas City was one of the eleven US host cities for the 2026 FIFA World Cup.

Kansas City is represented on the rugby pitch by the Kansas City Blues RFC, a former member of the Rugby Super League and a Division 1 club. The team works closely with Sporting Kansas City and splits home-games between Sporting's training pitch and Rockhurst University's stadium.

=== College athletics ===
In college athletics, Kansas City has been the home of the Big 12 College Basketball Tournaments. The men's tournament has been played at T-Mobile Center since March 2008. The women's tournament is played at Municipal Auditorium.

The city has one NCAA Division I program, the Kansas City Roos, representing the University of Missouri–Kansas City (UMKC). The program, historically known as the UMKC Kangaroos, adopted its current branding after the 2018–19 school year.

In addition to serving as the home stadium of the Chiefs, Arrowhead Stadium serves as the venue for various intercollegiate football games. It has hosted the Big 12 Championship Game five times. On the last weekend in October, the MIAA Fall Classic rivalry game between Northwest Missouri State University and Pittsburg State University took place at the stadium.

=== Former teams ===
Kansas City briefly had four short-term major league baseball teams between 1884 and 1915: the Kansas City Unions of the short-lived Union Association in 1884, the Kansas City Cowboys in the National League in 1886, a team of the same name in the then-major league American Association in 1888 and 1889, and the Kansas City Packers in the Federal League in 1914 and 1915. The Kansas City Monarchs of the now-defunct Negro National and Negro American Leagues represented Kansas City from 1920 through 1955. The city also had a number of minor league baseball teams between 1885 and 1955. After the Kansas City Cowboys began play in the 1885 Western League, from 1903 through 1954, the Kansas City Blues played in the high-level American Association minor league. In 1955, Kansas City became a major league city when the Philadelphia Athletics baseball franchise relocated to the city in 1955. Following the 1967 season, the team relocated to Oakland, California.

Kansas City was represented in the National Basketball Association by the Kansas City Kings (called the Kansas City–Omaha Kings from 1972 to 1975), when the former Cincinnati Royals moved to the Midwest in 1972. The team left for Sacramento in 1985.

In 1974, the National Hockey League placed an expansion team in Kansas City called the Kansas City Scouts. The team moved to Denver in 1976, then to New Jersey in 1982 where they have remained ever since as the New Jersey Devils.

== Parks and boulevards ==
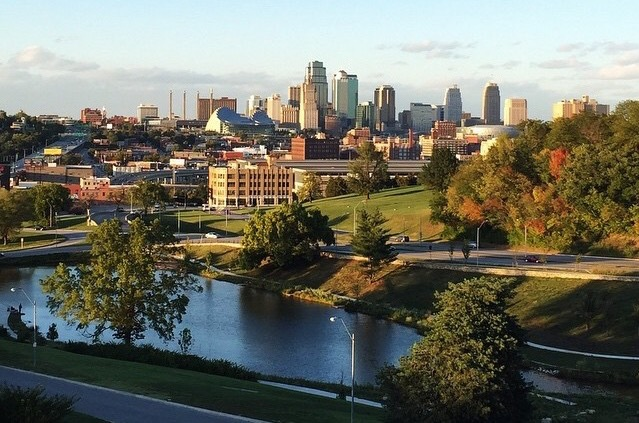
View of downtown from Penn Valley Park

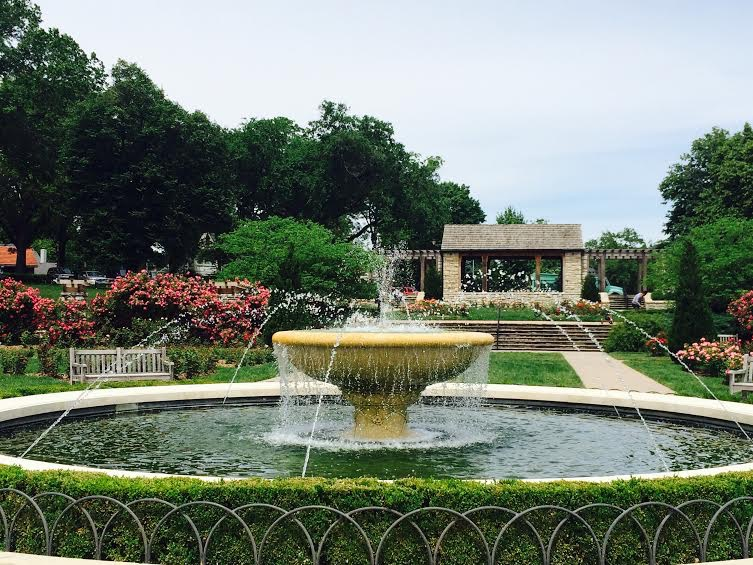
The rose garden in Loose Park is Kansas City's third-largest public park.

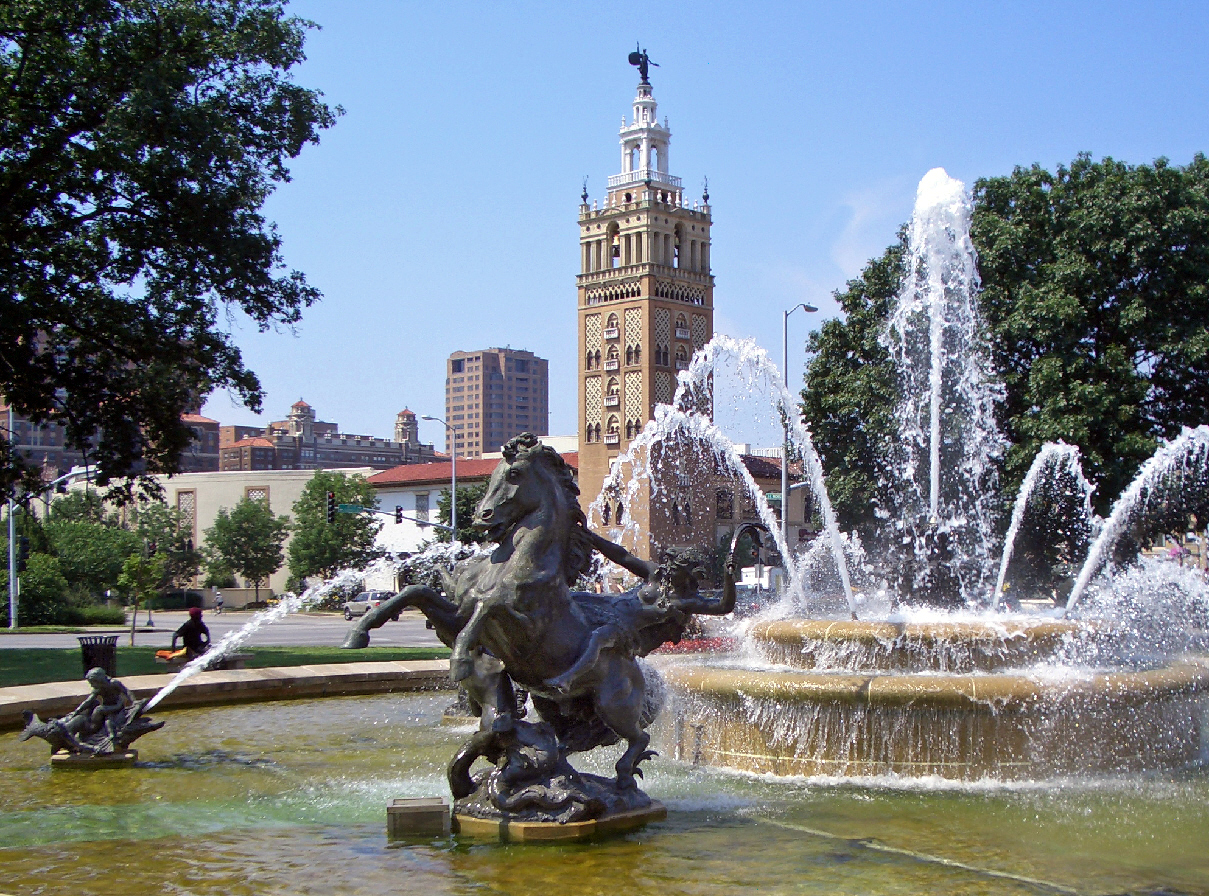
J.C. Nichols Memorial Fountain, by Henri-Léon Gréber, is in Mill Creek Park, adjacent to Country Club Plaza.

Kansas City has 132 miles (212 km) of boulevards and parkways, 214 urban parks, 49 ornamental fountains, 152 baseball diamonds, 10 community centers, 105 tennis courts, 5 golf courses, 5 museums and attractions, 30 pools, and 47 park shelters. These amenities are found across the city. Much of the system, designed by George E. Kessler, was constructed from 1893 to 1915.

Cliff Drive, in Kessler Park on the North Bluffs, is a designated State Scenic Byway. It extends 4.27 miles (6.87 km) from The Paseo and Independence Avenue through Indian Mound on Gladstone Boulevard at Belmont Boulevard, with many historical points and architectural landmarks.

Ward Parkway, on the west side of the city near State Line Road, is lined by many of the city's largest and most elaborate homes.

The Paseo is a major north–south parkway that runs 19 miles (31 km) through the center of the city beginning at Cliff Drive. It was modeled on the Paseo de la Reforma, a fashionable Mexico City boulevard. It has been recently renamed Martin Luther King Jr. Boulevard and now the city has voted to change it back to the Paseo.

Swope Park is one of the nation's largest city parks, comprising 1,805 acres (3 sq mi), more than twice the size of New York City's Central Park. It features a zoo, a woodland nature and wildlife rescue center, 2 golf courses, 2 lakes, an amphitheatre, a day-camp, and numerous picnic grounds. Hodge Park, in the Northland, covers 1,029 acres (416 ha) (1.61 sq. mi). This park includes the 80-acre (320,000 m^{2}) Shoal Creek Living History Museum, a village of more than 20 historical buildings dating from 1807 to 1885. Berkley Riverfront Park, 955 acres (3.86 km^{2}) on the banks of the Missouri River on the north edge of downtown, holds annual Independence Day celebrations and other festivals.

A program went underway to replace many of the fast-growing sweetgum trees with hardwood varieties.

=== Civil Engineering Landmark ===
In 1974, the Kansas City Park and Boulevard System was recognized by the American Society of Civil Engineers (ASCE) as a National Historic Civil Engineering Landmark. The nomination noted that this park system was among "...the first to integrate the aesthetics of landscape architecture with the practicality of city planning, stimulating other metropolitan areas to undertake similar projects." The park's plan developed by landscape architect George Kessler included some of the "...first specifications for pavements, gutters, curbs, and walks. Other engineering advances included retaining walls, earth dams, subsurface drains, and an impoundment lake – all part of Kansas City's legacy that has influenced urban planning in cities throughout North America."

== Law and government ==
=== City government ===
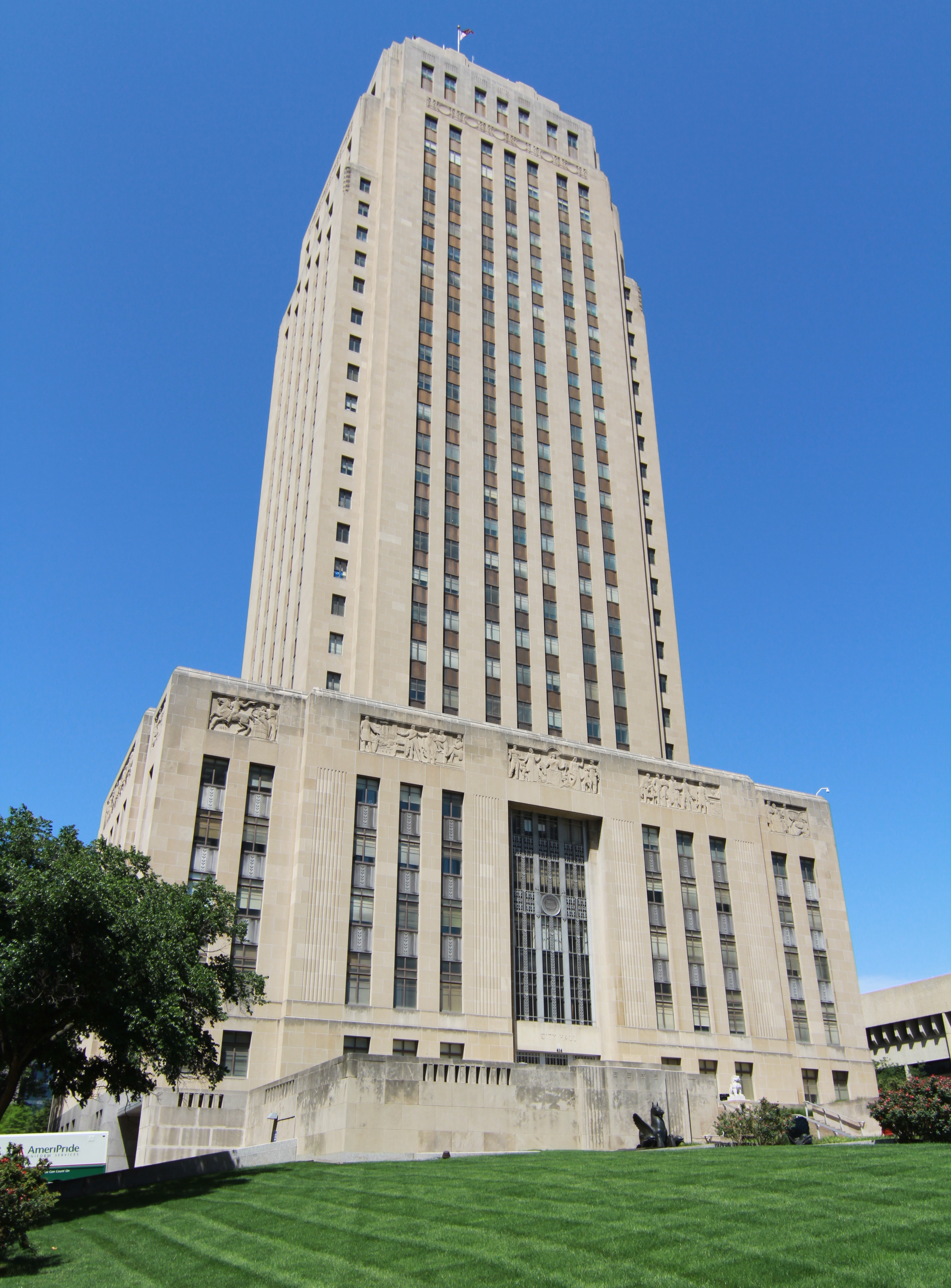
City Hall, Kansas City, Missouri

Kansas City is home to the largest municipal government in the state of Missouri. The city has a council/manager form of government. The role of city manager has diminished over the years. The non-elective office of city manager was created following excesses during the Pendergast days.

The mayor is the head of the Kansas City City Council, which has 12 members elected from six districts (one member elected by voters in the district and one at-large member elected by voters citywide). The mayor is the presiding member. By charter, Kansas City has a "weak-mayor" system, in which most of the power is formally vested in the city council. However, in practice, the mayor is very influential in drafting and guiding public policy.

Kansas City holds city elections in every fourth odd-numbered year. The last citywide election was held in April 2023. The officials took office in August 2023 and will hold the position until 2027.

Pendergast was the most prominent leader during the machine politics days. The most nationally prominent Democrat associated with the machine was Harry S. Truman, who became a Senator, Vice President and then President of the United States from 1945 to 1953. Kansas City is the seat of the United States District Court for the Western District of Missouri, one of two federal district courts in Missouri. The United States District Court for the Eastern District of Missouri is in St. Louis. It also is the seat of the Western District of the Missouri Court of Appeals, one of three districts of that court (the Eastern District is in St. Louis and the Southern District is in Springfield).

The Mayor, City Council, and City Manager are listed below:

Office	Officeholder
Mayor (presides over Council)	Quinton Lucas
Councilman, District 1 At-large	Kevin O'Neill
Councilman, District 1	Nathan Willett
Councilwoman, District 2 At-large	Lindsey French
Councilman, District 2	Wes Rodgers
Councilwoman, District 3 At-large	Melissa Patterson Hazley
Councilwoman, District 3	Melissa Robinson
Councilman, District 4 At-large	Crispin Rea
Councilman, District 4	Eric Bunch
Councilman, District 5 At-large	Darrell Curls
Councilwoman, District 5	Ryana Parks-Shaw
Councilwoman, District 6 At-large	Andrea Bough
Councilman, District 6	Johnathan Duncan
City Manager	Mario Vasquez
Mayor Pro-Tem	Ryana Parks-Shaw

=== National political conventions ===
Kansas City hosted the 1900 Democratic National Convention, the 1928 Republican National Convention and the 1976 Republican National Convention. The urban core of Kansas City consistently votes Democratic in presidential elections; however, on the state and local level Republicans often find success, especially in the Northland and other suburban areas of Kansas City.

=== Federal representation ===
Kansas City is represented by three members of the United States House of Representatives:

- Missouri's 4th congressional district – the Cass County portion of Kansas City; represented by Mark Alford (Republican)
- Missouri's 5th congressional district – most of Kansas City proper in Jackson County south of the Missouri River, Independence, and portions of Clay County; represented by Emanuel Cleaver (Democrat)
- Missouri's 6th congressional district – Portions of Kansas City proper north of the Missouri River in Jackson. Clay and Platte counties; represented by Sam Graves (Republican)

=== Crime ===
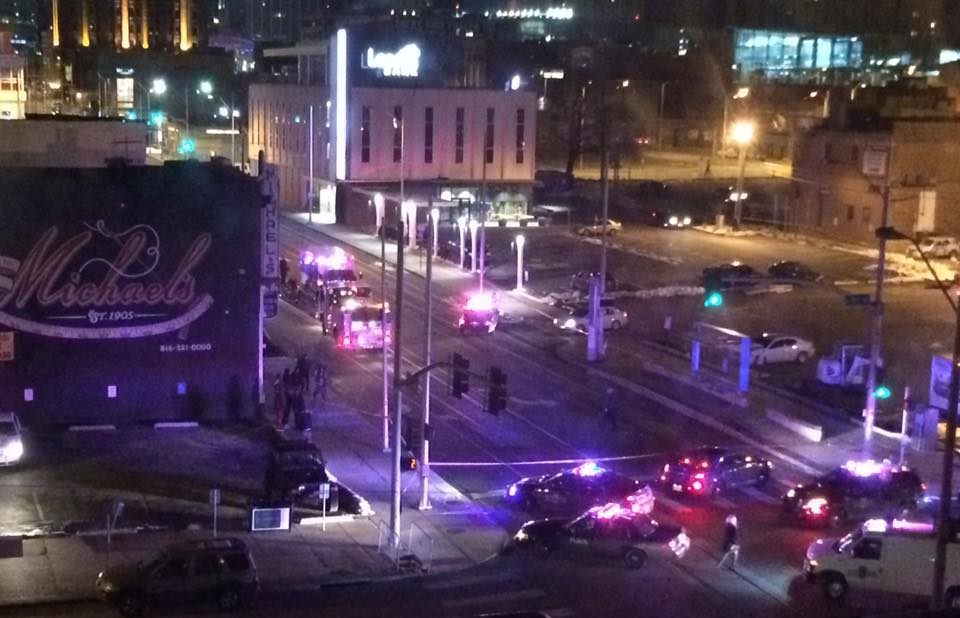
Police respond to a shooting in the Crossroads area during early New Year's Day 2016.

Some of the earliest organized violence in Kansas City was during the American Civil War. Shortly after the city's incorporation in 1850, so-called Bleeding Kansas erupted, affecting border ruffians and Jayhawkers. During the war, Union troops burned all occupied dwellings in Jackson County south of Brush Creek and east of Blue Creek to Independence in an attempt to halt raids into Kansas. After the war, the Kansas City Times turned outlaw Jesse James into a folk hero via its coverage. James was born in the Kansas City metro area at Kearney, Missouri, and notoriously robbed the Kansas City Fairgrounds at 12th Street and Campbell Avenue.

In the early 20th century under Pendergast, Kansas City became the country's "most wide open town". Though this gave rise to Kansas City jazz and to the Kansas City mob (initially under Johnny Lazia), and the arrival of organized crime. In the 1970s, the Kansas City mob was involved in a gang war over control of the River Quay entertainment district, in which three buildings were bombed and several gangsters were killed. Police investigations gained after boss Nick Civella was recorded discussing gambling bets on Super Bowl IV (where the Kansas City Chiefs defeated the Minnesota Vikings). The war and investigation led to the end of mob control of the Stardust Casino, which was the basis for the 1995 film Casino, though the production minimizes the Kansas City connections.

As of November 2012, Kansas City ranked 18th on the Federal Bureau of Investigation (FBI)'s annual survey of crime rates for cities with populations over 100,000. Much of the city's violent crime occurs on the city's lower income East Side. Revitalizing the downtown and midtown areas has been fairly successful and now these areas have below average violent crime compared to other major downtowns. According to a 2007 analysis by The Kansas City Star and the University of Missouri–Kansas City, downtown experienced the largest drop in crime of any neighborhood in the city during the 2000s.

== Education ==
=== Colleges and universities ===
Many universities, colleges, and seminaries are in the Kansas City metropolitan area, including:

- University of Missouri–Kansas City − one of four schools in the University of Missouri System, serving more than 15,000 students
- Rockhurst University − Jesuit university founded in 1910
- Kansas City Art Institute − four-year college of fine arts and design founded in 1885
- Kansas City University − medical and graduate school founded in 1916
- Avila University − Catholic university of the Sisters of St. Joseph of Carondelet
- Park University − private institution established in 1875; Park University Graduate School is downtown
- Baker University − multiple branches of the School of Professional and Graduate Studies
- William Jewell College − private liberal arts institution founded in 1849
- Metropolitan Community College − a two-year college with multiple campuses in the city and suburbs
- Midwestern Baptist Theological Seminary − Southern Baptist Convention
- Nazarene Theological Seminary − Church of the Nazarene
- Calvary University
- Saint Paul School of Theology − Methodist

=== Primary and secondary schools ===
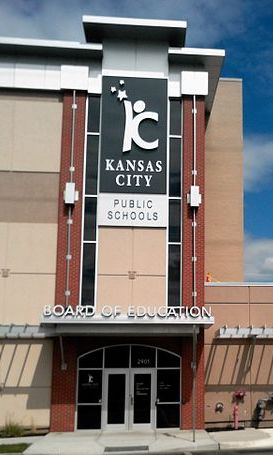
Headquarters of the Kansas City Public Schools, which serves the inner core of the city

The city is not served by one unified school district, but 15 separate districts due to the historical unwillingness of suburban voters to merge their existing school districts with the Kansas City district as the city expanded its limits in the 1950s and 1960s. Prior to 1957, areas annexed by the City of Kansas City were obligated to join the KCMO school district. Briana O'Higgins of KCUR wrote that prior to Brown v. Board of Education community members of smaller school districts "were happy to join KCMSD", which at the time was racially segregated. After laws changed in 1957, expansion occurred in areas not in the KCMO school district, and the KCMO school district faced a decline in academics and facility quality.

School outcomes vary between and even within districts, with some high schools being nationally ranked, and others having some of the lowest graduation rates. There are also numerous private schools; Catholic schools are governed by the Diocese of Kansas City.

The following public school districts serve Kansas City:

In the Jackson County portion of the city:

- Kansas City Public Schools
- Blue Springs R-4 School District
- Center School District
- Grandview C-4 School District
- Hickman Mills C-1 School District
- Independence School District
- Lees Summit R-7 School District
- Raytown C-2 School District

In the Cass County portion:

- Belton School District

In the Clay County portion:

- Kearney R-I School District
- Liberty School District
- North Kansas City School District
- Smithville School District

In the Platte County portion:

- Park Hill School District
- Platte County R-3 School District

=== Libraries and archives ===
- Linda Hall Library − internationally recognized independent library of science, engineering and technology, housing over one million volumes
- Mid-Continent Public Library − largest public library system in Missouri, and among the largest collections in America
- Kansas City Public Library − oldest library system in Kansas City
- University of Missouri–Kansas City Libraries − four collections: Leon E. Bloch Law Library and Miller Nichols Library, both on Volker Campus; and Health Sciences Library and Dental Library, both on Hospital Hill in Kansas City
- Rockhurst University Greenlease Library
- The Black Archives of Mid-America − research center of the African American experience in the central Midwest
- National Archives and Records Administration (NARA), Central Plains Region − one of 18 national records facilities, holding millions of archival records and microfilms for Iowa, Kansas, Missouri, and Nebraska in a new facility adjacent to Union Station, which was opened to the general public in 2008

== Media ==
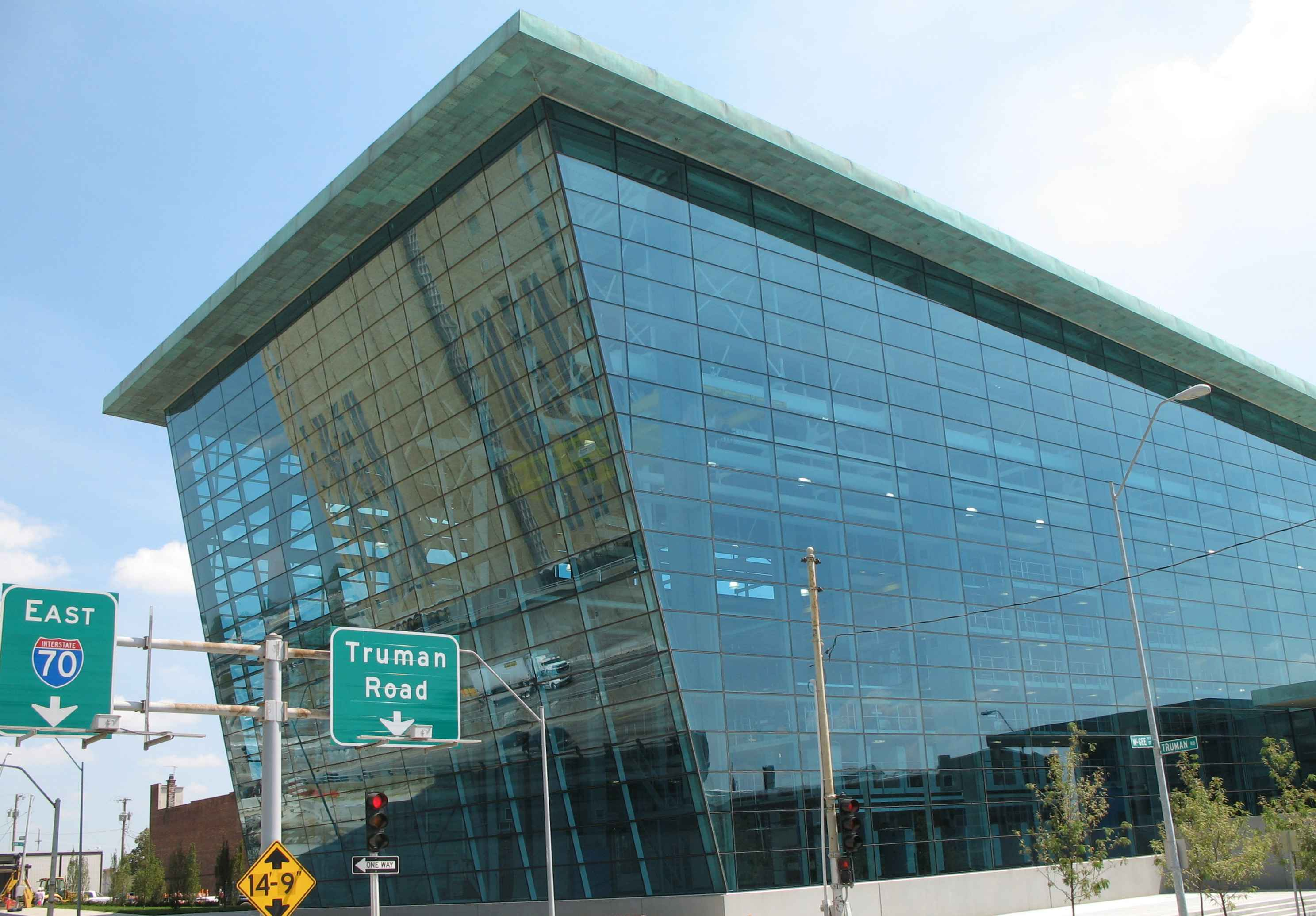
The Kansas City Star's former printing facility opened in 2006.

=== Print media ===
The Kansas City Star is the area's primary newspaper. William Rockhill Nelson and his partner, Samuel Morss, first published the evening paper on September 18, 1880. The Star competed with the morning Kansas City Times before acquiring that publication in 1901. The Times name was discontinued in March 1990, when the morning paper was renamed the Star.

Weekly newspapers include The Call (which is focused toward Kansas City's African-American community), the Kansas City Business Journal, The Pitch, Ink, and the bilingual publications Dos Mundos and KC Hispanic News.

Publications include Ingram's Magazine and a local society journal, the Independent.

The city is served by two major faith-oriented newspapers: The Kansas City Metro Voice, serving the Christian community, and the Kansas City Jewish Chronicle, serving the Jewish community. It is the headquarters of the National Catholic Reporter, an independent Catholic newspaper.

=== Broadcast media ===
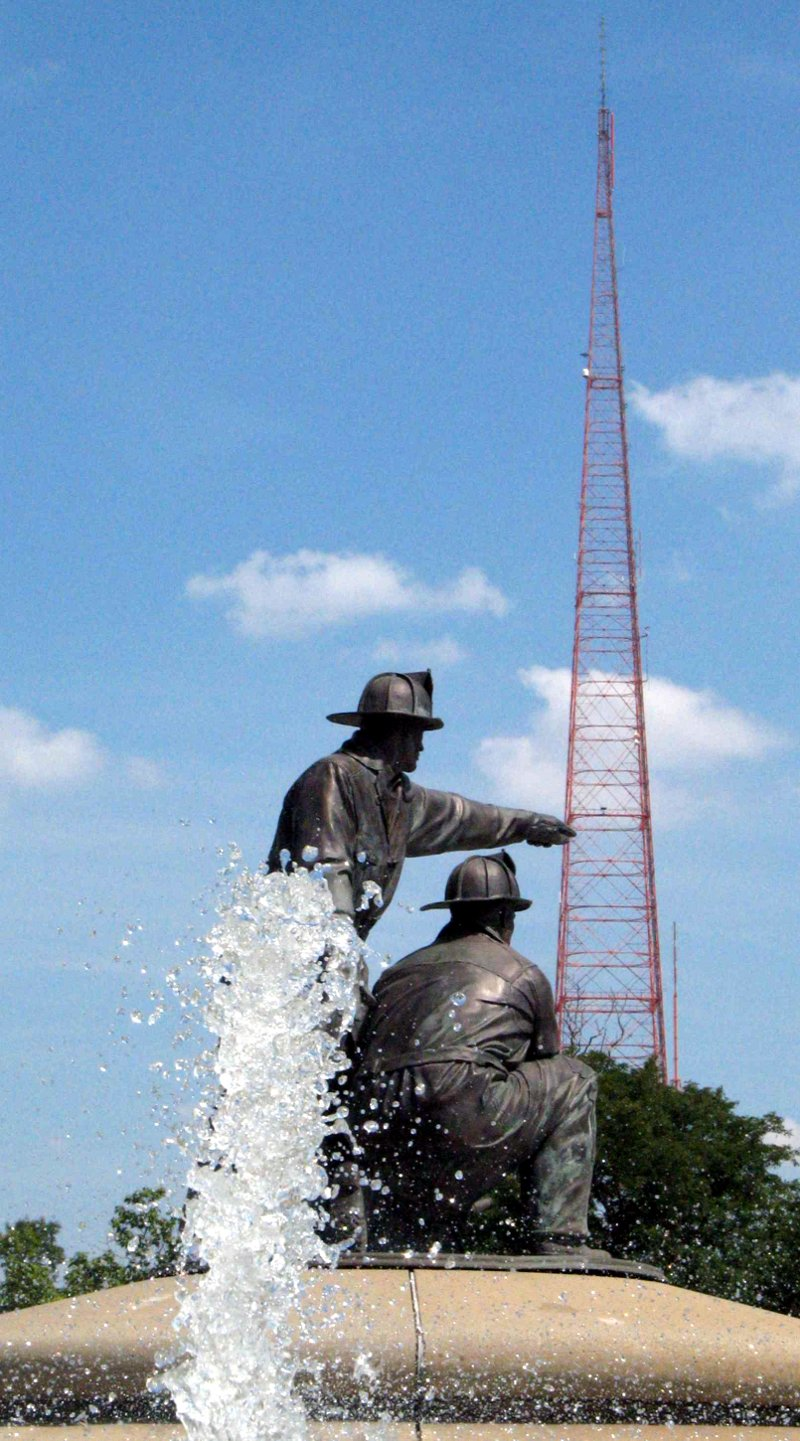
Landmark KCTV Tower on East 31st on Union Hill

The Kansas City media market (ranked 32nd by Arbitron and 31st by Nielsen) includes 10 television stations, 30 FM and 21 AM radio stations. Kansas City broadcasting jobs have been a stepping stone for national television and radio personalities, notably Walter Cronkite and Mancow Muller.

WDAF radio (now at 106.5 FM; original 610 AM frequency now occupied by KFNZ) signed on in 1927 as an affiliate of the NBC Red Network, under the ownership of The Star. In 1949, the Star signed on WDAF-TV as an affiliate of the NBC television network. The Star sold off the WDAF stations in 1957, following an antitrust investigation by the United States government (reportedly launched at Truman's behest, following a long-standing feud with the Star) over the newspaper's ownership of television and radio stations. KCMO radio (originally at 810 AM, now at 710 AM) signed on KCMO-TV (now KCTV) in 1953. The respective owners of WHB (then at 710 AM, now at 810 AM) and KMBC radio (980 AM, now KMBZ), Cook Paint and Varnish Company and the Midland Broadcasting Company, signed on WHB-TV/KMBC-TV as a time-share arrangement on VHF channel 9 in 1953; KMBC-TV took over channel 9 full-time in June 1954, after Cook Paint and Varnish purchased Midland Broadcasting's stations.

The major broadcast television networks have affiliates in the Kansas City market (covering 32 counties in northwestern Missouri, with the exception of counties in the far northwestern part of the state that are within the adjacent Saint Joseph market, and northeastern Kansas); including WDAF-TV 4 (Fox), KCTV 5 (CBS), KMBC-TV 9 (ABC), KCPT 19 (PBS), KCWE 29 (The CW), KSHB-TV 41 (NBC) and KSMO-TV 62 (MyNetworkTV). Other television stations in the market include Saint Joseph-based KTAJ-TV 16 (TBN), Kansas City, Kansas-based TV25.tv (consisting of three locally owned stations throughout northeast Kansas, led by KCKS-LD 25, affiliated with several digital multicast networks), Lawrence, Kansas-based KMCI-TV 38 (independent), Spanish-language station KUKC-LD 20 (Univision), Spanish-language station KGKC-LD 39 (Telemundo), and KPXE-TV 50 (Ion Television). The Kansas City television stations also serve as alternates for the nearby Saint Joseph television market.

=== Film community ===
Kansas City has been a locale for film and television productions. Between 1931 and 1982 Kansas City was home to the Calvin Company, a large film production company that specialized in promotional shorts for corporations and in educational films for schools and the government. Calvin was an important venue for Kansas City arts, training local filmmakers who went on to Hollywood careers and also employing local actors, most of whom earned their main income in fields such as radio and television announcing. Kansas City native Robert Altman directed movies at the Calvin Company, which led him to shoot his first feature film, The Delinquents, in Kansas City using many local players.

The 1983 television movie The Day After was filmed in Kansas City and Lawrence, Kansas. The 1995 film Truman, starring Gary Sinise, was filmed in the city. Other films shot in or around Kansas City include Article 99, Mr. & Mrs. Bridge, Kansas City, Paper Moon, In Cold Blood, Ninth Street, and Sometimes They Come Back (in and around nearby Liberty, Missouri). More recently, a scene in the controversial film Brüno was filmed in downtown Kansas City's historic Hotel Phillips.

Today, Kansas City is home to an active independent film community. The Independent Filmmaker's Coalition is an organization dedicated to expanding and improving independent filmmaking in Kansas City. The city launched the KC Film Office in October 2014 with the goal of better marketing the city for prospective television shows and movies to be filmed there. The City Council passed several film tax incentives in February 2016 to take effect in May 2016; the KC Film Office is coordinating its efforts with the State of Missouri to reinstate film incentives on a statewide level. Kansas City was named as a top city to live and work in as a movie maker in 2020.

== Transportation ==
Originally, Kansas City was the launching point for travelers on the Santa Fe, Oregon, and California trails. Later, with the construction of the Hannibal Bridge across the Missouri River, it became the junction of 11 trunk railroads. More rail tonnage passes through the city than through any other U.S. city. Trans World Airlines (TWA) located its headquarters in the city, and had ambitious plans to turn the city into an air hub.

According to the American Community Survey, 81.6 percent of working Kansas City residents commuted to work by driving alone, 7.9 percent carpooled, 2.7 percent used public transportation, and 1.7 percent walked to work. About 1.5 percent commuted by other means, including taxi, bicycle, or motorcycle. About 4.6 percent of working Kansas City residents worked at home.

In 2015, 11.4 percent of Kansas City households were without a car, which was virtually unchanged in 2016 (11.3 percent). The national average was 8.7 percent in 2016. Kansas City averaged 1.58 cars per household in 2016, compared to a national average of 1.8 per household.

=== Highways ===
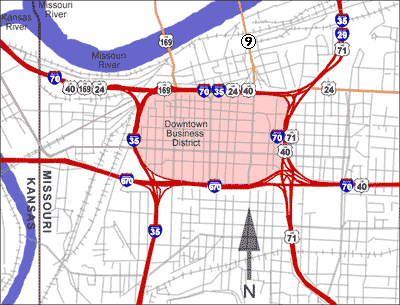
Kansas City is a major meeting place for several of the nation's busiest highways.

Missouri and Kansas were the first states to start building interstates with I-70. I-435, which encircles the entire city, is the second longest beltway in the Interstate Highway System. (I-275 around Cincinnati is the longest.) The Kansas City metro area has more limited-access highway lane-miles per capita than any other large US metro area, over 27% more than the second-place Dallas–Fort Worth metroplex, over 50% more than the average American metropolitan area. From 2013 to 2017 the average commuting time was 21.8 minutes. The Sierra Club blames the extensive freeway network for excessive sprawl and the decline of central Kansas City. However, the relatively uncongested road network contributes significantly to Kansas City's position as one of America's largest logistics hubs.

Interstate highways in the city include I-29, I-35, I-49, I-70, I-435, I-470, I-635, and I-670. U.S. highways include US 24, US 40, US 50, US 56, US 69, US 71, and US 169. Portions of the Missouri State Highway System are Route 1, Route 9, Route 12, Route 45, Route 78, Route 92, Route 150, Route 152, Route 210, Route 269, Route 283, Route 291, and Route 350. Missouri supplemental routes are Route AA, Route D, Route K, Route V, and Route W. Other routes include the Chicago–Kansas City Expressway and the Lewis and Clark National Historic Trail.

=== Mass and intercity transit ===
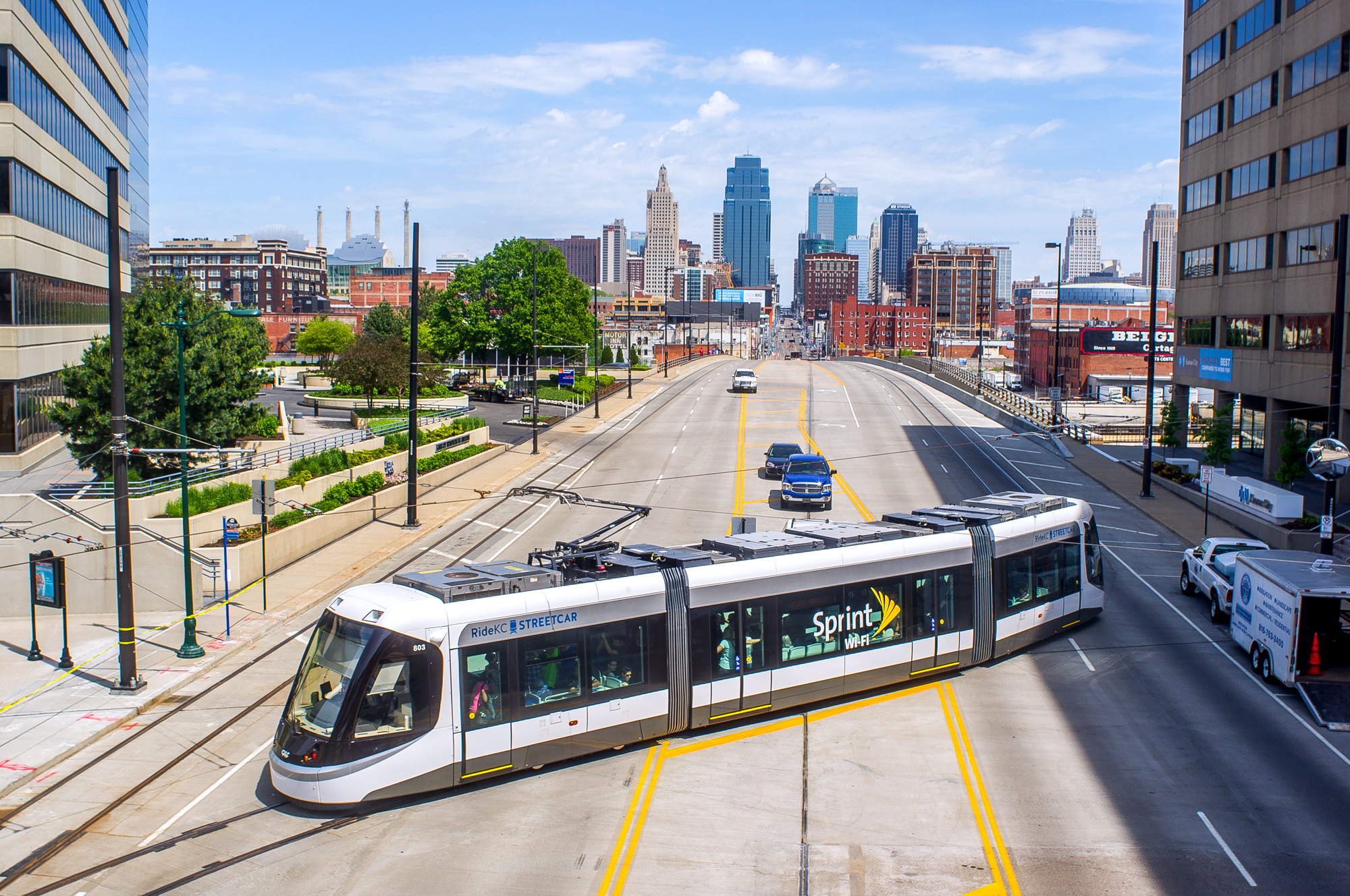
KC Streetcar leaving the line's Union Station terminus

Amtrak operates two routes via Kansas City, the Southwest Chief to Chicago or Los Angeles, and the Missouri River Runner to St. Louis. On December 28, 1965, the Kansas City Area Transportation Authority (KCATA) was formed via a bi-state compact created by the Missouri and Kansas legislatures. In 2015, the KCATA, Unified Government Transit, Johnson County Transit, and IndeBus began merging from individual metro services into one coordinated transit service for the metropolitan area, called RideKC. The buses and other transit options are branded as RideKC Bus, RideKC MAX, RideKC Streetcar, and RideKC Bridj. RideKC Bridj is a micro transit service partnership between Ford Bridj and KCATA that began on March 7, 2016, much like a taxicab service and with a mobile app.

In July 2005, the KCATA launched Kansas City's first bus rapid transit line, the Metro Area Express (MAX). In 2010, a second MAX line was added on Troost Avenue. The city is planning another MAX line down Prospect Avenue. The Prospect MAX line launched in 2019 and Mayor Quinton Lucas announced the service would be fare-free indefinitely. Intercity bus services to Kansas City are provided by Greyhound Lines and Jefferson Lines at the Kansas City Bus Station.

From 1870 to 1957, Kansas City's streetcar system was among the top in the country, with over 300 miles (480 km) of track at its peak. The rapid sprawl in the following years led this private system to be shut down. In 2012, a ballot initiative to construct a $102 million, 2-mile (3.2 km), modern KC Streetcar line in downtown Kansas City was approved by local voters. The streetcar route runs along Main Street from River Market to Union Station; it debuted on May 6, 2016. A new non-profit corporation made up of private sector stakeholders and city appointees – the Kansas City Streetcar Authority – operates and maintains the system. Unlike many similar systems around the U.S., no fare is charged. The extension to Berkley Riverfront Park was completed in May 2026.

=== Airports ===
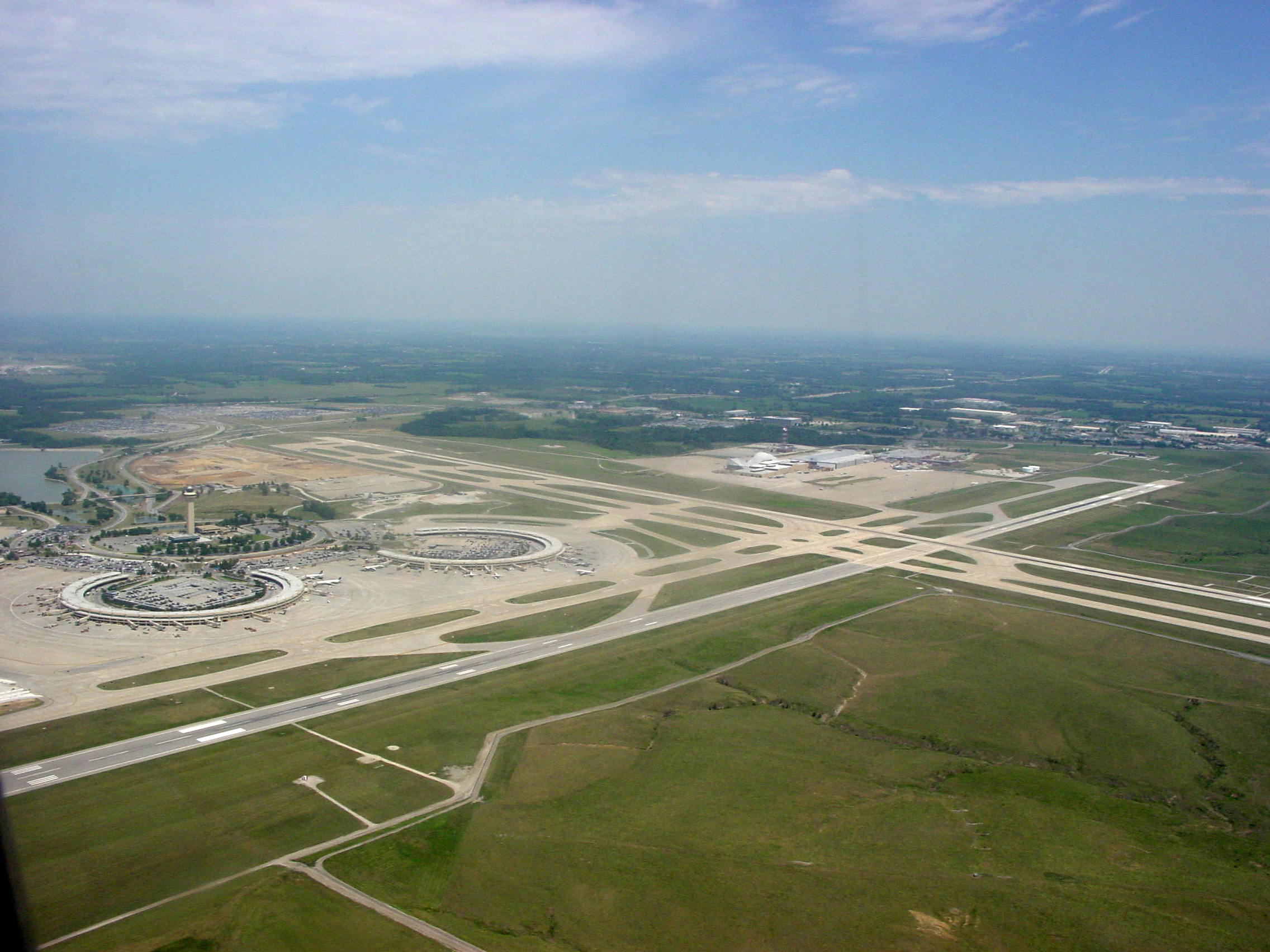
Kansas City International Airport

Kansas City International Airport (airport code MCI) was built to TWA's specifications to make a world hub. Its original passenger-friendly design placed each of its gates 100 feet (30 m) from the street. Following the September 11, 2001 attacks, it required a costly overhaul to conform to tighter security protocols from the Transportation Security Administration. In March 2023, a new $1.5 billion terminal opened on the site of the old Terminal A. Designed by Skidmore, Owings and Merrill, it is a single, advanced technology terminal with 39 gates, eventually planned to entirely replace remaining Terminals B and C. Charles B. Wheeler Downtown Airport (airport code MKC) was TWA's original headquarters and houses the Airline History Museum. It is used for general aviation and airshows.

=== Walkability ===
A 2015 study by Walk Score ranked Kansas City as the 42nd most walkable out of the 50 largest U.S. cities. As a whole, the city has a score of 34 out of 100. However, several of the more densely populated neighborhoods have much higher scores: Westport has a score of 91, the Downtown Loop has a score of 85, the Crossroads scored 85, and the Plaza scored 83. Those ratings range from "A Walker's Paradise" to "Very Walkable". In April 2017, voters approved an $800 million general obligation bond, part of which is designated for sidewalk repairs and creating complete-streets.

== Sister cities ==
Kansas City has 15 sister cities:

City	Subdivision	Country	Date
Seville	Andalusia	Spain	1967
Kurashiki	Okayama Prefecture	Japan	1972
Morelia	Michoacán	Mexico	1973
Freetown	Western Area	Sierra Leone	1974
Tainan		Taiwan	1978
Xi'an	Shaanxi	People's Republic of China	1989
Guadalajara	Jalisco	Mexico	1991
Hannover	Lower Saxony	Germany	1993
Port Harcourt	Rivers State	Nigeria	1993
Arusha	Arusha Region	Tanzania	1995
San Nicolás de los Garza	Nuevo León	Mexico	1997
Ramla		Israel	1998
Metz	Moselle	France	2004
Yan'an	Shaanxi	People's Republic of China	

== Notable people ==
Current or former long-time residents include cartoonists Walt Disney, Friz Freleng, and Ub Iwerks; musicians Count Basie and Tech N9ne; actors Don Cheadle and Chris Cooper; politicians Emanuel Cleaver and Tom Pendergast; and reporter Walter Cronkite.

== See also ==
- List of cities in Missouri
- 2024 Kansas City parade shooting
- Kansas City Police Officers Association
- List of people from Kansas City, Missouri
- Sites of interest of Kansas City
- USS Kansas City, three ships
