= Kemper =

Kemper may refer to:

== Buildings ==
- Kemper Arena, in Kansas City, Missouri
- Kemper Building (Chicago), a skyscraper in Chicago, Illinois
- Kemper Hall, a 1911 mansion in Kenosha, Wisconsin
- Kemper Museum of Contemporary Art, in Kansas City, Missouri

== Companies ==
- Thomas Kemper, an American soda brewing company
- Kemper Corporation, an American insurance group

== Places ==
- Quimper (Breton: Kemper), France
- Kemper County, Mississippi
- Kemper, Illinois
- Kemper, South Carolina

== People ==
=== Surname ===
- Alfons Kemper (born 1958), German computer scientist
- Andreas Kemper (born 1963), German sociologist
- Boy Kemper (born 1999), Dutch footballer
- Charles Kemper (1900–1950), American film actor
- Christine de Bosch Kemper (1840–1924), Dutch feminist
- David Kemper (born 1947), American rock drummer
- David Kemper (writer), American television writer and producer
- Dieter Kemper (1937–2018), German cyclist
- Dorla Eaton Kemper (1929–2025), American civic leader
- Edmund Kemper (born 1948), American serial killer and necrophile
- Ellie Kemper (born 1980), American actress and comedian
- Franz-Josef Kemper (born 1945), German middle-distance runner
- Frederick T. Kemper (1816–1881), American school-founder
- Heinrich Kemper (1888–1962), German politician
- Hermann Kemper (1892–1977), German electrical engineer and inventor
- Hunter Kemper (born 1976), American triathlete
- Jackson Kemper (1789–1870), American Episcopalian bishop
- James L. Kemper (1823–1895), Confederate general in the American Civil War and governor of Virginia, U.S.
- James S. Kemper (1886–1981), American insurance company founder and billionaire
- Jeltje de Bosch Kemper (1836–1916), Dutch feminist
- Joan Melchior Kemper (1776–1824), Dutch jurist and politician
- Johan Kemper (1670–1716), Polish Christian Kabbalist
- Johnny Kemper, American bodybuilder and actor
- Kay Ann Kemper, stage name of Kay Lenz (born 1954), American actor
- Kathy Kemper, American tennis coach, columnist and CEO
- R. Crosby Kemper (1892–1972), American banker and philanthropist
- R. Crosby Kemper Jr. (1927–2014), American banker and philanthropist
- Reuben Kemper (1770–1826), American filibuster
- Samuel Kemper (died 1814), American filibuster
- Sandy Kemper (born 1965), American financial entrepreneur
- Tom Kempers (born 1969), Dutch tennis player
- Victor J. Kemper (1927–2023), American cinematographer
- William Thornton Kemper Sr. (1866–1938), American banker and entrepreneur

=== Given name ===
- Kemper Freeman (born 1941), American real estate developer
- Kemper Goodwin (1906–1997), American architect
- Kemper Harreld (1885–1971), African-American concert violinist
- Kemper Nomland (1919–2009), American architect
- Kemper Yancey (1887–1957), American football player and coach

== Other uses ==
- Kemper: The CoEd Killer, a 2008 film
- Kemper Insurance Open, a former golf tournament in Potomac, Maryland
- Kemper Lakes Golf Club, Kildeer, Illinois
- Kemper Military School, in Boonville, Missouri, U.S.
- Kemper Project, an energy project in Kemper County, Mississippi
