= History of the Kansas City metropolitan area =

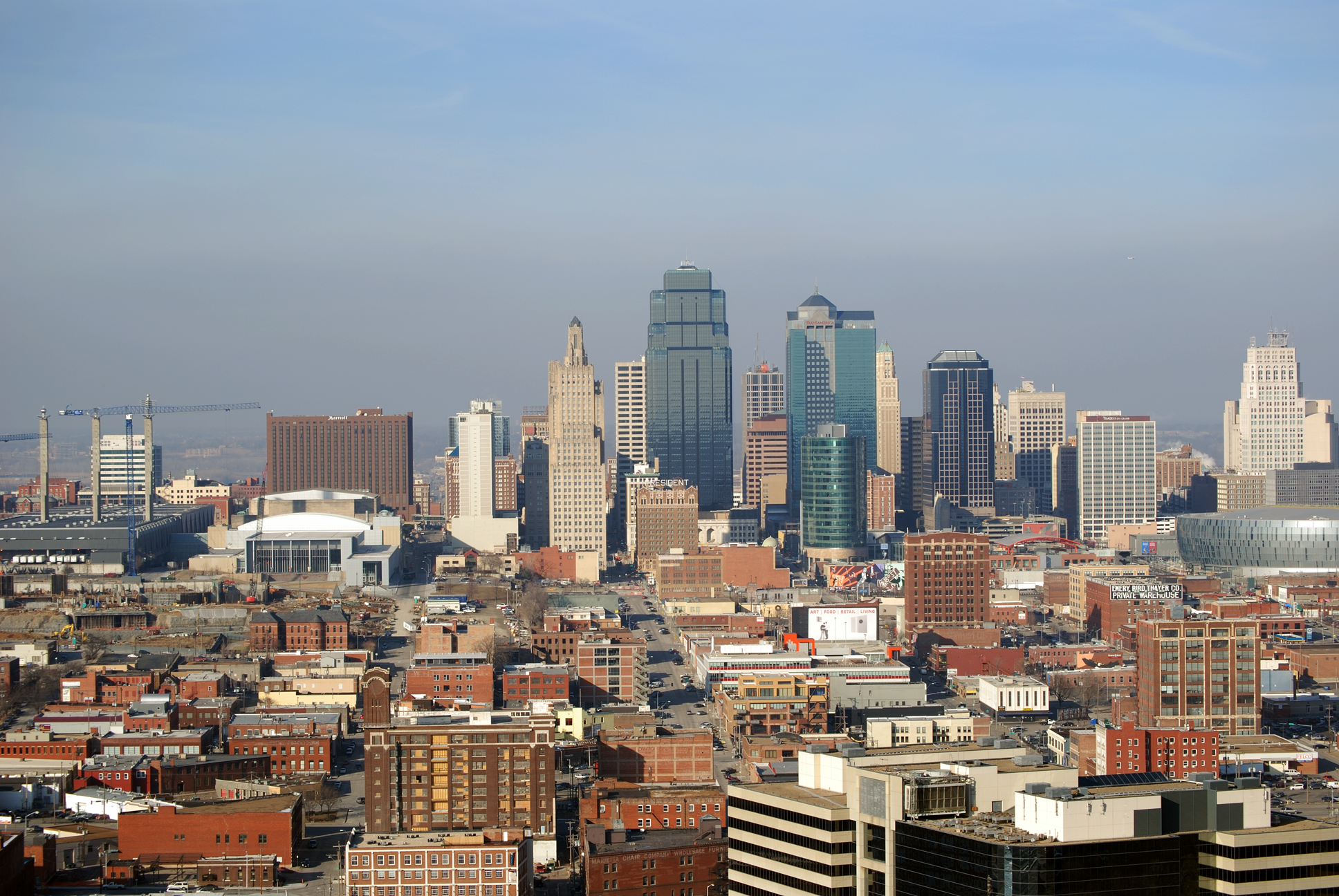
Kansas City, Missouri, skyline from the Liberty Memorial

The history of the Kansas City metropolitan area relates to the area around the confluence of the Kansas and Missouri Rivers and the modern-day city of Kansas City, Missouri.

Before the arrival of European explorers, the area was inhabited at various times by peoples of the Hopewell tradition and later the Mississippian culture, as well as the Kansa, Osage, Otoe and Missouri tribes. In the early 18th century, Frenchmen from St. Louis, Missouri moved up the Missouri River to trap for furs and trade with the local Native Americans. The area was acquired by the United States from France in the Louisiana Purchase in 1803, and Americans began settling there in greater numbers after the organization of the Missouri Territory in 1812. In 1838, Kansas City was founded and eventually surpassed neighboring Westport to become the predominant city west of St. Louis. The area was also a focal point in the westward expansion of the United States, as both the Santa Fe and Oregon trails ran nearby. After formation of the Kansas Territory in 1854, the violence along its border with Missouri was a prelude to the American Civil War.

== Exploration ==
=== Bourgmont ===
The first documented French visitor to the Kansas City area was Étienne de Veniard, Sieur de Bourgmont, who was also the first European to explore the lower Missouri River. Bourgmont was on the lam from French authorities after deserting his post as commander of Fort Detroit, after being criticized for his handling of a Native American attack on the fort. He lived with a Native American wife in the Missouri village about 90 miles (145 km) east near Brunswick, Missouri, and illegally traded furs.

To clear his name, Bourgmont wrote "Exact Description of Louisiana, of Its Harbors, Lands and Rivers, and Names of the Indian Tribes That Occupy It, and the Commerce and Advantages to Be Derived Therefrom for the Establishment of a Colony" in 1713, and in 1714, "The Route to Be Taken to Ascend the Missouri River". In these documents, he described the junction of the Kansas and Missouri rivers, as the first to refer to them by those names. French cartographer Guillaume Delisle used the descriptions to make the first reasonably accurate map of the area.

The French rewarded Bourgmont by giving him their highest honors and naming him commander of the Missouri. He built the first fort (and first extended settlement in Missouri) in 1723 at Fort Orleans, near his Brunswick home. In 1724, Bourgmont led a group of Native Americans probably up the Kansas River en route to the southwest to set up an alliance with the Comanche to fight the Spanish, thereby creating a New France empire extending from Montreal through Missouri to New Mexico. To celebrate the success of the venture, he took the Native American chiefs on a junket to Paris to hunt with Louis XV and see the glory of France at Versailles and Fontainebleau.

Bourgmont got promoted to official noble status and stayed in Normandy, not accompanying the chiefs back to the New World. According to legend, the Native Americans then slaughtered everybody in the Fort Orleans garrison. The Spanish took over the region in the Treaty of Paris in 1763, but were not to play a major role in the area other than taxing and licensing all traffic on the Missouri River. The French continued their fur trade on the river under Spanish license.

=== Lewis and Clark ===
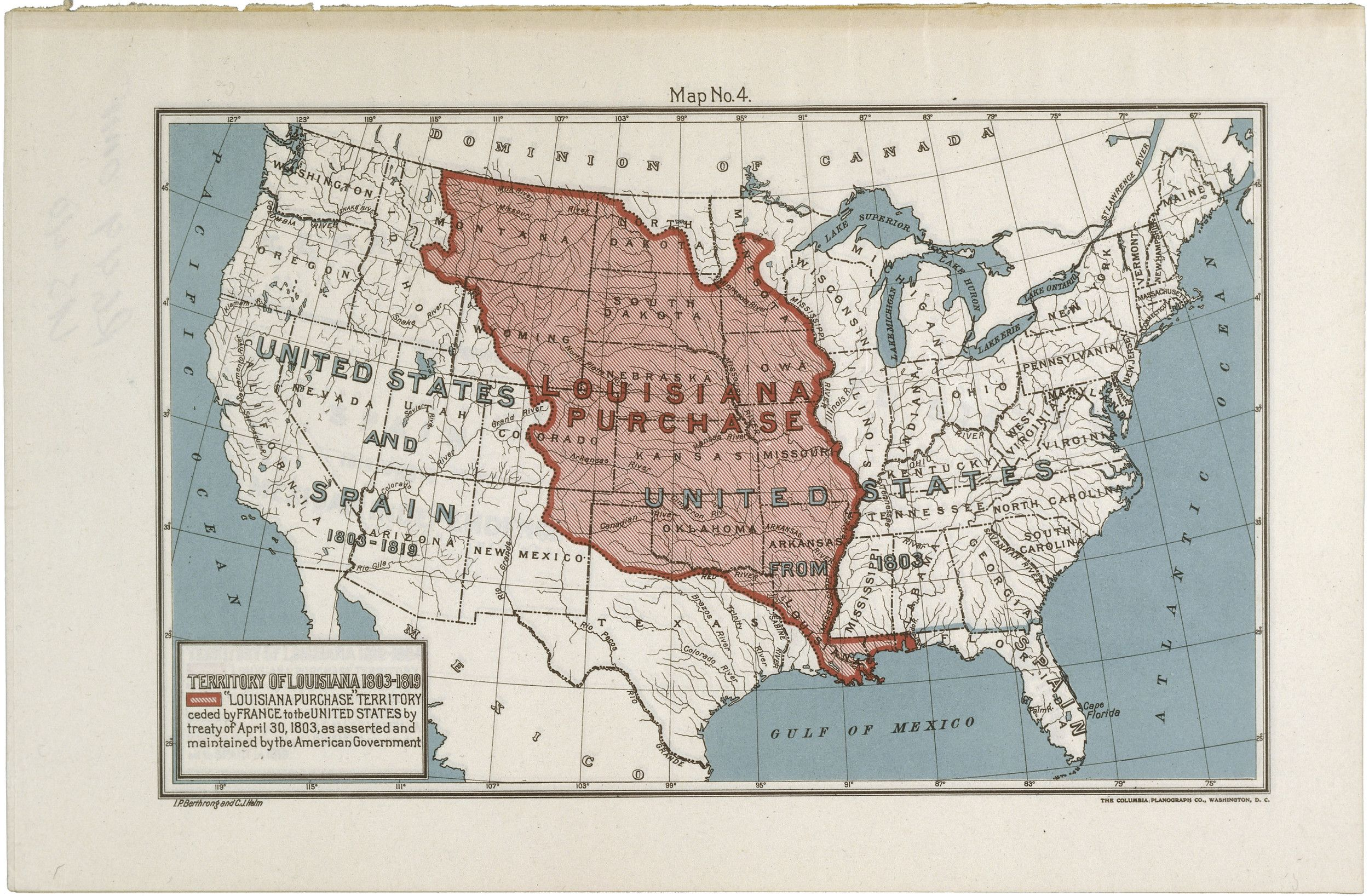
Frank Bond illustrated the Louisiana Purchase.

Following the Louisiana Purchase of 1803, the Lewis and Clark Expedition left St. Louis on a mission to reach the Pacific Ocean. In 1804, Lewis and Clark camped for three days at the confluence of the Kansas and Missouri rivers. During their stay there, they met French fur traders and mapped the area of Quality Hill in what would eventually become Kansas City, Missouri, calling it "a fine place for a fort". This became Kansas City, Kansas, memorialized at Kaw Point Park.

Because of the burgeoning trade up the Missouri River from St. Louis, especially following Lewis and Clark's expedition, the United States Government sought to create government posts all throughout the area. In 1808, Fort Osage was established 20 miles from the confluence of the Missouri and Kansas Rivers near present-day Sibley, Missouri.

=== Kaw's Mouth ===
In 1812, after Louisiana officially became a state, the remaining portions of the original Louisiana Territory north of Arkansas were renamed the Missouri Territory. As plans were made to divide up the territory for the entry of Missouri into the union, it was determined that the western border of the new state would run from Iowa along the Missouri River to the confluence of the Kansas River (Kaw) and the Missouri River, then as a straight line running south to the northwest corner of Arkansas. As part of the Missouri Compromise in 1821, Congress admitted Missouri to the union as the 24th state and as a slave state. The area of the confluence of the two rivers, alternately known as the village of Kansa, Chouteau's, Quindaro, Westport Landing, Missouri River Quay, Town of Kansas, City of Kansas, and finally Kansas City, has been subject to several floods and river course changes. Since 1800, the confluence has moved about a quarter mile up the Missouri River.

== Early to mid-1800s ==
=== Native Americans ===
Missouri joined the Union in 1821 and, after the Treaty of St. Louis in 1825, the 1,400 Missouri Shawnees were forcibly relocated from Cape Girardeau to southeastern Kansas, close to the Neosho River. In 1826, the Prophet Tenskwatawa established a village in Argentine, Kansas. During 1833, only chief Black Bob's band of Shawnee resisted the relocation efforts. They settled in northeastern Kansas, near Olathe and along the Kansas River in Monticello, near Gum Springs. Tenskwatawa died in 1836 at his village in Kansas City, Kansas (ed., the White Feather Spring marker notes the location).

=== Early European settlers ===
The language of the first European settlement in Kansas City was French. In 1821, 24-year-old François Gesseau Chouteau, nephew of René Auguste Chouteau, set up a permanent trading post in the great bend in the Missouri River that makes up the Northeast Industrial District (crossed today by Chouteau Trafficway). He referred to the post as "the village of the Kansa". In 1825, after natives agreed to leave the westernmost six miles of Missouri to the confluence of the Kansas, the area was referred to as "Chouteau's". In 1826, Chouteau moved his trading post to higher ground, Troost Avenue and the river, following a flood. He also financed the first Catholic church, which was built on Quality Hill.

The area was soon populated by trappers, scouts, traders, and farmers, leading to the incorporation of Jackson County, Missouri, in December 1826 and the founding of the town of Independence a few months later, located approximately 10 miles (16 km) from the river junction, as its county seat. As the number of farmers increased, the fur traders retreated northward. In 1831, Moses Grinter established a ferry on the Kansas River on the old Indian trail by the Kaw's water. Grinter was one of the earliest permanent white settlers in the Kansas City, Kansas, area.

=== Latter Day Saint movement ===
In 1831, members of the Church of Christ, the original name of the Latter Day Saint church founded by Joseph Smith, came from Kirtland, Ohio, and New York State and purchased about 2,000-acre (8.1 km^{2}) of land in the Paseo and Troost Lake areas. Conflict between the Saints and other Missouri residents led to the eviction of the Latter Day Saints from Jackson County in 1833 and then the 1838 Mormon War. Despite their expulsion, many Mormons continued to believe that their New Jerusalem (or "city of Zion") would be located at Independence, Missouri.

Years later, various groups of Latter Day Saints returned to Jackson County, the first of whom were members of the diminutive Church of Christ (Temple Lot), quickly followed by adherents to the Reorganized Church of Jesus Christ of Latter Day Saints under the leadership of Joseph Smith III and members of other factions, several of whom had established their headquarters in nearby Independence, Missouri.

The Church of Jesus Christ of Latter-day Saints (LDS Church) is the largest sect in the Latter Day Saint movement and is headquartered in Salt Lake City, Utah. The LDS Church opened the Kansas City Missouri Temple on May 6, 2012.

=== Westport and Westport Landing ===
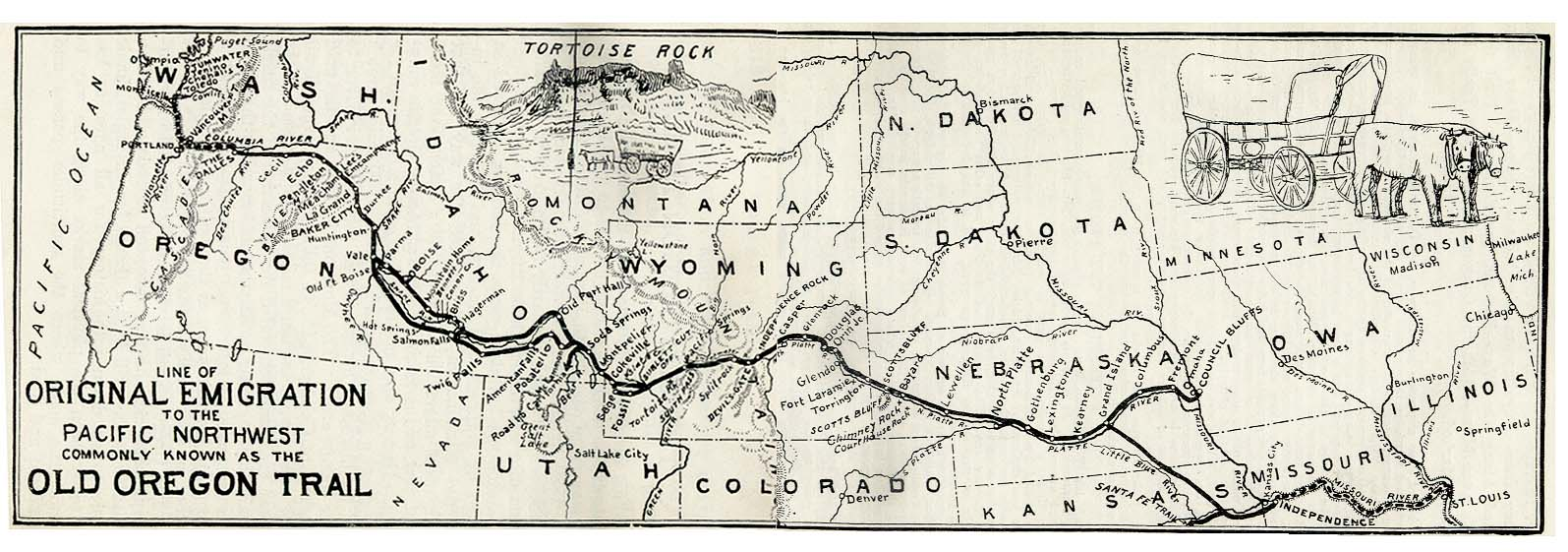
The Old Oregon Trail, 1852–1906, by Ezra Meeker

Over the next years, the character of Kansas City was defined by those who wanted to live close to the river (who were referred to as "Rabbits") and those who wanted to live in the hills (the "Goats"). John Calvin McCoy, who is considered the "father of Kansas City", had a hand in establishing settlements in both locations. In 1833, he opened a trading post in the hills three miles south of the river. McCoy named it "West Port" because it was the last place to get supplies before travelers went into Kansas Territory on the California Trail, Santa Fe Trail, and Oregon Trail. McCoy got supplies from boats that docked at a rocky outcropping on the river at what is Main Street and the river; the area was called "Westport Landing". McCoy's landing and Chouteau's trading post drove traffic to the last outpost before settlers traveled up the Kansas River or Missouri River. The road connecting Westport with the trading post and Westport Landing followed Broadway. In 1834, the steamboat John Hancock, which was laden with goods for McCoy, became the first steamboat to dock at the Westport Landing and opened up a new era of communication and transportation for the area.

=== Town of Kansas ===
Expansion around the landing was stifled because it was a farm mostly owned by Gabriel Prudhomme. In 1838, McCoy, Chouteau, and other merchants formed the Town of Kansas Company and purchased Prudhomme's 271-acre (1.1 km^{2}) farm for US$4,220 (equivalent to about $128,000 in 2025). The investors had rejected other names for the new town including Port Fonda, Rabbitville, and Possum Trot. The next year, in 1839, Chouteau died, and the town outside of Westport Landing was named Kansas.

Throughout the 1840s, the population and importance of Kansas swelled as it and nearby Independence and Westport became starting points on the Oregon, Santa Fe, and California trails for settlers heading west. Between St. Louis and California, one of the few substantially populated areas was around Kaw Point at the confluence of the Missouri and Kansas rivers. The first railroad came to Kansas in 1847.

Jackson County formally incorporated the town of Kansas, Missouri on June 3, 1850, traditionally viewed as the retrospective founding date for what became Kansas City. Kansas's population was approximately 1,500 people. In 1851 or 1852, its first newspaper was called Public Ledger, was soon defunct, and in October 1854 was succeeded by the first permanent local newspaper, the Kansas City Enterprise. It was soon followed by the first telegraph service.

=== City of Kansas ===
On March 28, 1853, Missouri officially incorporated it, renaming it the City of Kansas. At the first municipal election in 1853, there were 67 voters from an estimated population of 2,500. The initial incorporated area was about 10 blocks west to east and five blocks north to south. It was bordered by Bluff Road (about the location of what became Interstate 35) on the west, Independence Avenue on the south, Holmes Street on the east, and the Missouri River on the north. William S. Gregory was elected the first mayor but had to resign within 10 months when it was discovered that the mayor actually had to live within the city limits, so Johnston Lykins became the first legal mayor.

==== Border War ====
At the time of the City of Kansas's incorporation, Missouri was still a slave state. However, the population was deeply divided over the issue of slavery. In 1854, the United States Congress passed the Kansas–Nebraska Act, which rejected the 1820 Missouri Compromise and allowed new territories to choose to allow slavery, whereas the Missouri Compromise had prohibited slavery in any new states to be created north of latitude 36°30'. Thus, according to the Missouri Compromise, Kansas Territory (located immediately to the west of the City of Kansas, Missouri) had been a free territory but now could choose to permit slavery.

As a result of the new potential for slavery in Kansas, pro-slavery activists infiltrated Kansas Territory from the neighboring slave state of Missouri. To abolitionists and other Free-Staters, who desired Kansas to be admitted to the Union as a free state, they were collectively known as Border Ruffians. Pro-slavery Missourians flocked to Kansas in force, electing a pro-slavery Kansas Territorial Legislature. In response, abolitionists began arriving in the area, and in 1855 they declared the Kansas Territorial Legislature "bogus" and elected their own representatives to form a new territorial government in Lawrence, Kansas (approximately 35 miles (56 km) west of the City of Kansas). The newly established City of Kansas soon found itself in the middle of a dispute known as Bleeding Kansas.

During the conflict, the City of Kansas continued to grow rapidly. It gained a courthouse, city market, and chamber of commerce in 1857. In 1858, however, the local violence had grown so fierce that the Kansas Territorial Governor and the State of Missouri both asked U.S. President James Buchanan to send in federal troops. The president agreed, and with the troops' presence the violence seemed quelled.

==== Civil War ====
Missouri stayed in the Union during the Civil War. However, since the city's first settlers had arrived via the Missouri River from the South, considerable tension existed there between pro-Union and pro-Confederate sympathizers. Missourian Sterling Price was to fight battles in the area at the beginning and end of the war, hoping to incite residents to join the Southern cause. Thus, the City of Kansas and its immediate environs became the focus of intense military activity. The First Battle of Independence resulted in a Confederate victory, but the Southerners were not able to follow it up in any meaningful way, as the City of Kansas was occupied by Union troops and proved too heavily fortified for them to assault.

In 1863, William Quantrill sacked and burned Lawrence, killing 168 people in what was called the Lawrence Massacre. The collapse of a makeshift prison in Kansas City holding women associated with bushwhackers was one of Quantrill's motivations for the massacre. Union General Thomas Ewing, Jr., believing that the raid was rooted in the four Missouri counties on the Kansas border south of the Missouri River, promulgated his General Order No. 11 which ordered the eviction of all those living in rural areas outside of designated urban areas, regardless of their loyalty. This order affected those living south of Brush Creek and east of the Blue River, and proved a source of resentments that lingered long after the war. The city's first mayor was exiled to St. Louis.

In 1864, Price invaded Missouri in a last-gasp Confederate offensive called Price's Raid. He pushed Union troops out of Independence in the Second Battle of Independence and into the City of Kansas, resulting in the pivotal Battle of Westport in October of that year near Brush Creek. Price was decisively defeated and forced out of the state, ending all significant Confederate military operations in the area.

After the war, Kansas City remained a hotbed for former pro-Southerns. John Newman Edwards founded the Kansas City Times to stringently object to Republican rule. He also created the Jesse James anti-hero myth, with James as a modern-day Robin Hood fighting an unjust Republican Reconstruction. Jesse James went on to rob the Kansas City fairgrounds at 12th Street and Campbell, all the while living at various places throughout the metropolitan area.

== Mid to late 1800s ==
=== Crossroads of the country ===
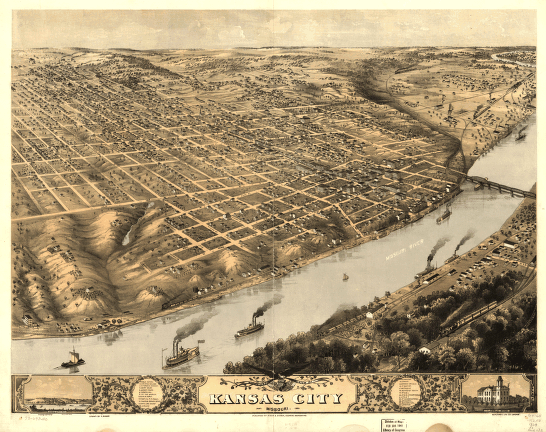
This aerial map of Kansas City, Missouri, was drawn by A. Ruger, Merchants Lith. Co. in January 1869.

In 1865, the Missouri Pacific railroad reached Kansas City. At the time, Kansas City was similar in population to Independence and Leavenworth, Kansas. That was to change in 1867, when Kansas City defeated Leavenworth (then over twice Kansas City's size) for the Hannibal & St. Joseph Railroad bridge over the Missouri River. The Hannibal Bridge, designed by Octave Chanute, opened in 1869. With that, the city's population quadrupled in fifty years.

In 1889, with a population of around 130,000, the city adopted a new charter and changed its name to Kansas City. In 1897, Kansas City annexed Westport. The initial meeting of tracks occurred in the West Bottoms an area that had previously been used to outfit travellers on the Oregon and Santa Fe trails who had followed the Kansas River. The biggest outfitting facility was the Central Overland California and Pikes Peak Express Company. That company went out of business following the collapse of the Pony Express. Its facilities were to become the Kansas City Stockyards. The city has since been the second to Chicago as busiest train center in the country. In 1914, the city's Union Station in the West Bottoms became outdated and the new Union Station was built.

=== Cow town ===
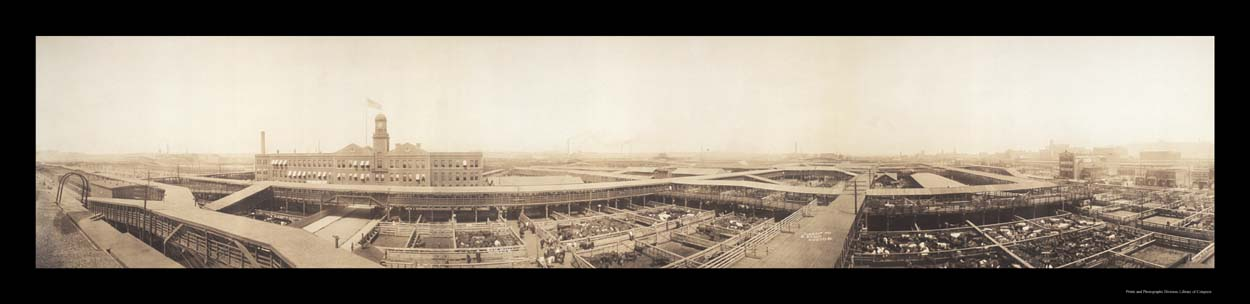
The Kansas City Stockyards had the Livestock Exchange Building in 1904.

In 1871, the Kansas City Stockyards boomed in the West Bottoms because of their central location in the country and their proximity to trains. They became second only to Chicago's in size, and the city itself was identified with its famous Kansas City steak. In 1899, the American Hereford Association hosted a cattle judging contest in a tent in the stockyards. That event soon became the annual American Royal two-month-long livestock festival. The Kansas City Stockyards were destroyed in the Great Flood of 1951 and never fully recovered.

=== Strawberry Hill ===
In 1887, John G. Braecklein constructed a Victorian home for John and Margaret Scroggs in the area of Strawberry Hill. It is a fine example of the Queen Anne Style architecture erected in Kansas City, Kansas.

== 1890s to 1940 ==
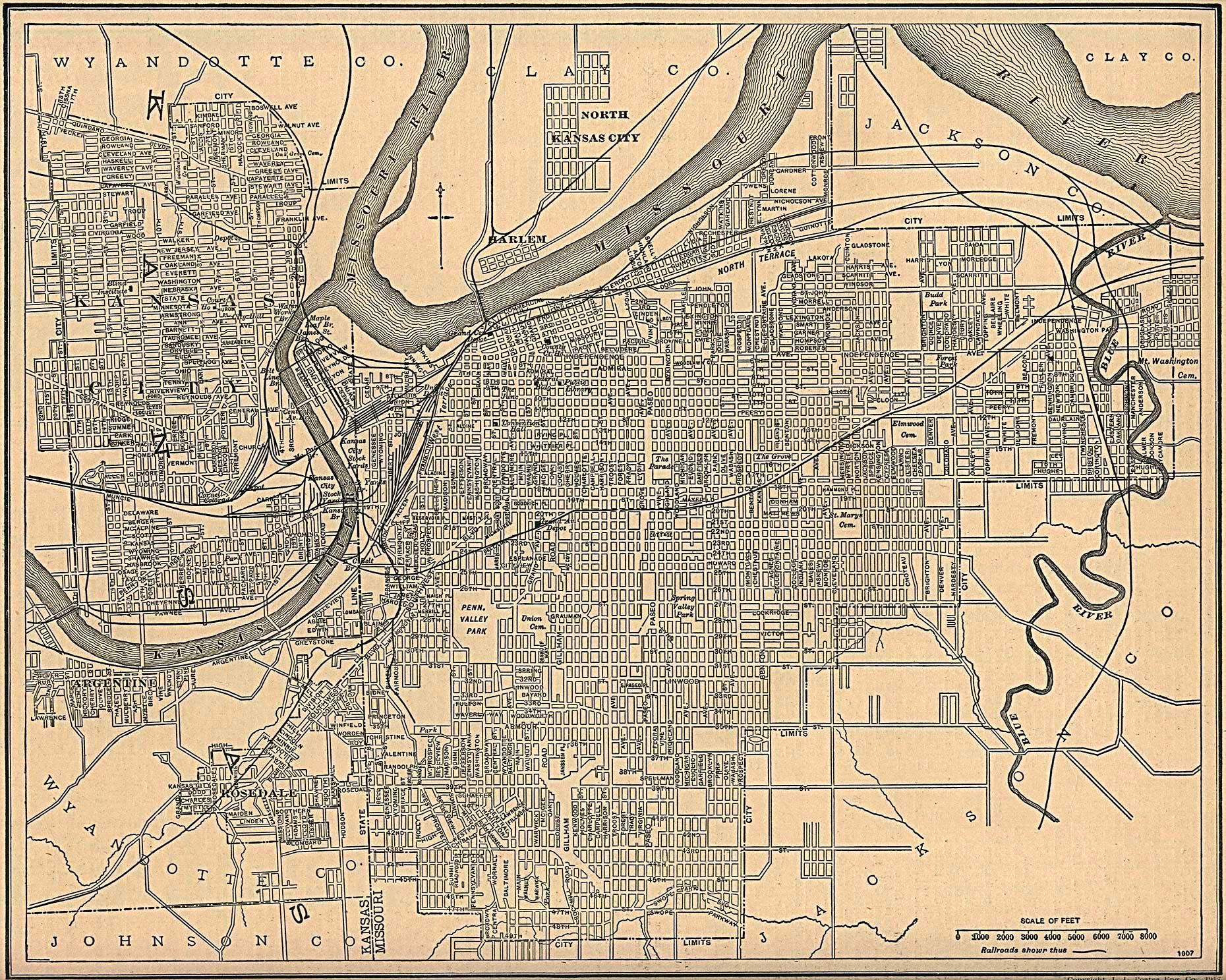
Kansas City area in 1907

=== Pendergast era ===
The Pendergast era, under Democrat big city bosses James and Tom Pendergast from 1890 to 1940, ushered in a colorful and influential era for the city. The Pendergasts presided over an era in which many outsized personalities shaped the city and contributed to the whole country. During this period, the Pendergasts ensured that national prohibition was meaningless in Kansas City; the Kansas City boulevard and park system was developed; the Country Club Plaza, Country Club District, and Ward Parkway were created; TWA made Kansas City the hub of national aviation; most of the downtown Kansas City buildings were built; its inner city culture blossomed with contributions to Negro league baseball, Kansas City jazz music, and Kansas City-style barbecue cuisine; the stockyards and train station were second only to Chicago; and Harry S Truman, from nearby Independence, became President. Much of the construction during these "wide open days" used Pendergast Readi-Mix Concrete, and the era was marked by considerable violence and corruption. Pendergast was ultimately defanged with a 1939 income tax evasion charge.

==== Prohibition ====
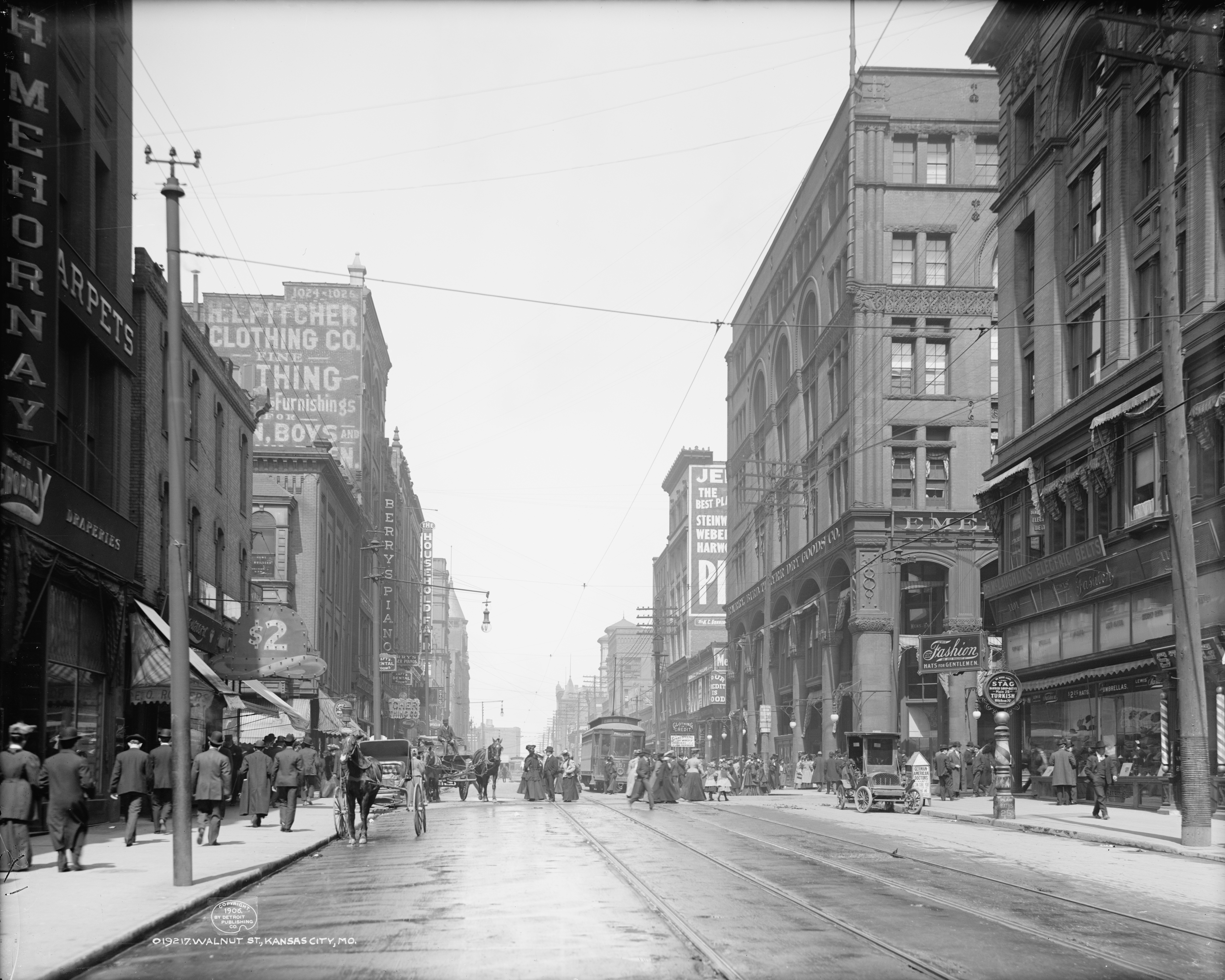
Walnut St., Downtown Kansas City, Missouri. 1906

Kansas enacted statewide prohibition on February 19, 1881. In Kansas City, however, residents on the Kansas side of the area who wished to drink simply went across the state line to Kansas City, Missouri, to the many saloons and taverns there. 12th Street in Downtown Kansas City was known for its large number of taverns. During the ongoing temperance movement, however, Missouri never enacted statewide prohibition. Missourians actually rejected statewide prohibition in three separate referendums in 1910, 1912, and 1918, all of which were brought by citizens' initiative petitions. In April 1901, famous temperance crusader Carrie A. Nation came to Kansas City and began to enter the saloons on 12th Street and smash liquor bottles with her hatchet. When she entered Flynn's Saloon on April 15, she promptly was arrested, hauled into Police Court (known today as the Municipal Court of Kansas City), fined US$500 (equivalent to $19,350 in 2025), and ordered by a judge to leave Kansas City and never return.

When prohibition finally was imposed on Missouri in 1919 by means of the Eighteenth Amendment to the United States Constitution and the subsequent Volstead Act, Kansas City remained essentially unaffected, mostly due to the Pendergast machine. Due to Pendergast, prohibition simply "never existed in Kansas City" because he kept the bars open, the liquor supplied, and Kansas City's federal prosecutor on his payroll to never bring a single felony prosecution under the Volstead Act. Dr. George Miller, the editor of the Omaha Herald, even remarked, "If you want to see some sin, forget about Paris. Go to Kansas City." So, when prohibition finally was repealed in 1933 by means of the Twenty-first Amendment, very little changed in Kansas City.

==== World War I memorial ====
The Liberty Memorial, which houses The National World War I Museum, was dedicated on November 11, 1926, by U.S. President Calvin Coolidge. In attendance at the groundbreaking ceremony on November 1, 1921, were Lieutenant General Baron Jacques of Belgium, Admiral Lord Earl Beatty of Great Britain, General Armando Diaz of Italy, Marshal Ferdinand Foch of France and General John Pershing of the United States. In 1935, bas reliefs by Walker Hancock of Jacques, Beatty, Diaz, Foch and Pershing were unveiled.

==== Union Station massacre ====
Violence and gangster activity proliferated during this time. On June 17, 1933, three gangsters attempted to free Frank Nash from FBI custody, but wound up killing him and four unarmed agents. This is known as the Union Station massacre. The gangsters had spent the prior evening at the Hotel Monroe, adjacent to Pendergast's office, and had received assistance in eluding a bribed police force from John Lazia, a major underworld figure with connections to Pendergast.

=== Politics ===
==== James Pendergast ====
In 1880, James Pendergast, the oldest son of Irish immigrants, moved to Kansas City's West Bottoms. He worked at a local iron foundry until he bought a bar with money he won from betting on a longshot horse (Climax) at a local race track. From his new bar, Pendergast began networking with local leaders and soon built a powerful faction in the Jackson County Democratic Party. Pendergast's faction was called the "Goats", because they were backed by those living in the hills above the river. His chief rivals were the "Rabbits" because they tended to come from the area around the rivers. The lead of this faction was Joe Shannon.

==== Tom Pendergast ====
Just prior to winning his first of nine terms on the city council in 1892, James summoned his youngest brother Tom from nearby St. Joseph. As Jim's health deteriorated, Tom began to utilize many of his brother's connections to lead the "Goat" faction after Jim's death in 1910. Tom succeeded Jim in the council too, but left after three terms and assumed a more powerful position as chairman of the Jackson County Democratic Club with its headquarters at 1908 Main Street.

===== City manager =====
In 1925, Kansas City, Missouri, voted in favor of establishing a city manager-based government with one city council of 12 members instead of two chambers of 32 members total, giving Tom an easier road to gaining majority control. By 1925, the Pendergast machine had established a majority, appointing a passive mayor and powerful city manager Henry F. McElroy. Pendergast's power grew during the Great Depression, creating a Ten-Year Plan bond plan aimed at putting unemployed Kansas Citians to work building civic structures that still stand, including City Hall, Municipal Auditorium, and the Jackson County Courthouse. These structures, sporting art deco architecture, were built with concrete supplied by Pendergast's Ready-Mixed Concrete company and other companies that provided kickbacks to Pendergast.

At its peak, the machine wielded considerable influence on state politics, handily electing Platte County judge Guy Brasfield Park governor of Missouri in 1932 when the Democratic candidate Francis Wilson died two weeks before the election. Also during this time, Kansas City also became a center for nightlife and music, with jazz by musicians such as Count Basie and Charlie Parker, and blues flourishing in areas such as 18th and Vine. Pendergast's machine became synonymous with inflating election results by bringing in out-of-town hoodlums to vote for machine candidates repeatedly. The March 27, 1934, municipal elections (dramatized in Robert Altman's 1996 film Kansas City) resulted in nine deaths.

===== Machine's demise =====
Tom Pendergast's power was brought down by health ailments and a determined effort by The federal treasury department along with local reform leaders, capped by Tom pleading guilty to tax evasion on May 24, 1939. Remnants of the machine lingered until the 1950s. His biographers have summed up Pendergast's uniqueness:

Pendergast may bear comparison to various big-city bosses, but his open alliance with hardened criminals, his cynical subversion of the democratic process, his monarchistic style of living, his increasingly insatiable gambling habit, his grasping for a business empire, and his promotion of Kansas City as a wide-open town with every kind of vice imaginable, combined with his professed compassion for the poor and very real role as city builder, made him bigger than life, difficult to characterize.

=== Personalities ===
==== Walt Disney ====
Walt Disney moved to Kansas City with his family in the early 20th century. He attended weekend classes at the Kansas City Art Institute and was said to have been inspired to make the affectionate depiction of a mouse after seeing one in his office in Kansas City. After World War I, Disney ran his first animation studio at the Laugh-O-Gram Studio from 1921 to 1923 Kansas City.

==== Joyce Clyde Hall ====
J.C. Hall founded greeting card company Hallmark Cards with his brother Rollie in the early 20th century, by first selling Valentine's Day cards. He expanded the corporate headquarters into Crown Center shortly before he died in 1982.

==== TW&A ====
Charles Lindbergh helped lure the newly created Transcontinental & Western Airline (TW&A) – later Trans World Airlines (TWA) – to locate its corporate headquarters in Kansas City, because of the city's central location. During the latter part of the Golden Age of Aviation, the 1930s and 1940s, TWA was known as "The Airline Run by Flyers". With about 300 employees prior to World War II, the airline eventually employed more than 20,000 people from the metropolitan area.

==== William T. Kemper ====
William T. Kemper became the scion for a powerful financial family that had controlling interest of the city's two biggest banks, Commerce Trust Company (now Commerce Bancshares) and City Center Bank (later City National Bank, now UMB Financial Corporation). The family has influenced financial endeavors throughout Missouri and Kansas, including Kemper Arena and the Kemper Museum of Contemporary Art. William became president of Commerce. One of his sons, R. Crosby Kemper, controlled United Missouri Banks while the other son, James Madison Kemper, took over Commerce.

==== William Rockhill Nelson ====
William Rockhill Nelson founded the Kansas City Star in 1880, and was to eventually take over its prime competitor, the Kansas City Times. Nelson was a major supporter of the Democratic Party and an urban booster. At the urging of his paper, the city built Memorial Hall in 1899 to attract the 1900 Democratic National Convention. The hall burned in early 1900 was rebuilt in 90 days in time for the convention. Nelson left provisions that his house ultimately be torn down to create the Nelson-Atkins Gallery of Art.

==== J. C. Nichols ====
Beginning in 1906, developer J. C. Nichols created a planned upscale community called the Country Club District, located south of Brush Creek. This development is well known for Ward Parkway, a wide, divided, and manicured boulevard that goes north and south through the neighborhood. The parkway is lined with several large homes. In the 1920s, Nichols created the Country Club Plaza, a shopping district and neighborhood along Brush Creek modeled after the city of Seville, Spain. "The Plaza" is the world's first shopping center specifically designed to accommodate shoppers arriving by automobile. It is still one of the most popular shopping and dining venues in Kansas City – day and night. Every Thanksgiving evening, throngs of Kansas Citians flock there to watch the traditional Lighting of the Plaza, which kicks off the Christmas shopping season.

Nichols is responsible for "redlining" and residential covenants that kept Blacks, Jews, and other marginalized people from purchasing homes and living in the more desirable areas of Kansas City, like the neighborhoods around the Plaza that he developed. This racial divide continued in parts of the city, especially east of Troost Avenue. Because of this, the name of J.C. Nichols was stripped from a fountain and street on The Plaza.

==== Harry S Truman ====
Harry S Truman was born in Lamar, Missouri but grew up in Jackson County. He started a haberdashery in downtown Kansas City after World War I. When his business failed, he asked Pendergast for a job and became an Eastern Jackson County judge, actually a county commissioner position. Truman was later promoted to Senator. He was one of the few politicians who attended Tom Pendergast's funeral in 1945, just a few days after he became Vice President, and eventual President of the United States when Franklin Roosevelt died on April 12, 1945. Truman went on to win the following presidential election in 1948 and served another term.

=== R. A. Long ===
In 1873, Robert A. Long – who was born in Shelby County, Kentucky in 1850 – moved to Columbus, Kansas and with a friend and a cousin, Victor Bell and Robert White, started a hay business. Their business was unsuccessful, but there seemed to be a need for lumber so the three formed R. A. Long & Company. After White's death, the two remaining founders formed the Long-Bell Lumber Company in 1887 and the company's headquarters were moved to Kansas City. It became a very lucrative business, and made Long a millionaire. Other milestones achieved by Long included being a lumber baron, developer, investor, newspaper owner, and philanthropist. He built the towns of Longville, Louisiana and Longview, Washington. In 1907 he built the R.A. Long Building, the first steel framed skyscraper, in Kansas City. The building was bought by City National Bank & Trust Company in 1940. Long was a founding member and president of the Liberty Memorial Association that secured funding for the memorial. James M. Kemper served as treasurer and as president of a bank. In 1911 Long built Corinthian Hall, a 72-room mansion; then in 1914, he built the Longview Farm.

=== 18th Street & Vine ===
One of the most dramatic developments of the era was the flourishing of the inner city neighborhood of 18th Street and Vine.

==== Kansas City Monarchs ====
The Kansas City Monarchs played at Municipal Stadium and were one of the premier baseball teams in the Negro leagues with championship teams and stars such as Satchel Paige, Jackie Robinson and John Jordan "Buck" O'Neil.

==== Kansas City Jazz ====
With Kansas City not enforcing liquor laws and clubs being allowed to stay open all night, musicians began all-night jam sessions after performing in structured big band performances. The Kansas City sound was hard-driving, riff-bass and blues oriented. This was the environment in which Charlie Parker developed in his early years before heading to New York City and laying the foundations for bebop.

==== Kansas City-style barbecue ====
Henry Perry first introduced a Memphis-style barbecue to the city from his restaurant in the 18th Street and Vine area in the early 20th century. Arthur Bryant later added more molasses to the recipe when he took over Perry's restaurant. Gates Bar-B-Q which was opened in 1946, by George W. Gates, is the only remaining family owned barbecue restaurant in the area. It is also the only sauce and product manufacturer based in Kansas City. The still family owned business is owned and operated by Ollie W. Gates. In 1986, Rich Davis sold KC Masterpiece Bar-B-Q Sauce to the Kingsford charcoal division of Clorox.

== Crossroads of the world ==
The period between the 1940s and the 1970s was a heady time when Kansas City was sometimes considered the crossroads of the world. This was fueled by the Presidency of hometown native Harry Truman from 1945 to 1953, followed immediately by Kansan Dwight D. Eisenhower from 1953 to 1961. From the 1930s and part of this period TWA, under the leadership of Jack Frye, Paul E. Richter, and Howard Hughes as a stockholder, was headquartered in Kansas City. The city planned to turn the cosmopolitan hub into the gateway to the world. But the era's great expectations died down with the diminished presence of TWA.

=== 1940s ===
After the fall of the Pendergast machine, reformer John B. Gage was elected mayor in 1940 and L. P. Cookingham was named city manager. Gage was elected mayor three times and served until 1946, while City Manager Cookingham served until 1959. The Gage and Cookingham government sought to "clean up" Kansas City from its corrupt past and enact "fair" government practices and merit-based hiring of city employees.

The war effort brought defense jobs to Kansas City, which was still suffering from the Great Depression, including the Pratt & Whitney engine plant. Other armaments plants in Kansas City, Kansas and eastern Jackson County provided additional jobs to the region. This was a relatively prosperous time for the city. In 1945, Jackson County resident Harry Truman became President of the United States, following the death of Franklin Roosevelt.

==== Annexation ====
In the mid-1940s, the Gage and Cookingham government began to annex land to expand the city's size. The city increased its geographical size to five times its size in 1940, with the annexation programs continuing through the 1970s. Following World War II, Kansas City, like virtually all other metropolitan areas, experienced significant lower density expansion, which was fueled principally by movement from outside the area and also by population shifts from the city's core to the suburbs. While other cities shrank, the newly annexed land helped Kansas City retain its population. Growth since 1970, however, has been limited and often negative, even during a modest population growth in the 1990s.

=== 1950s ===
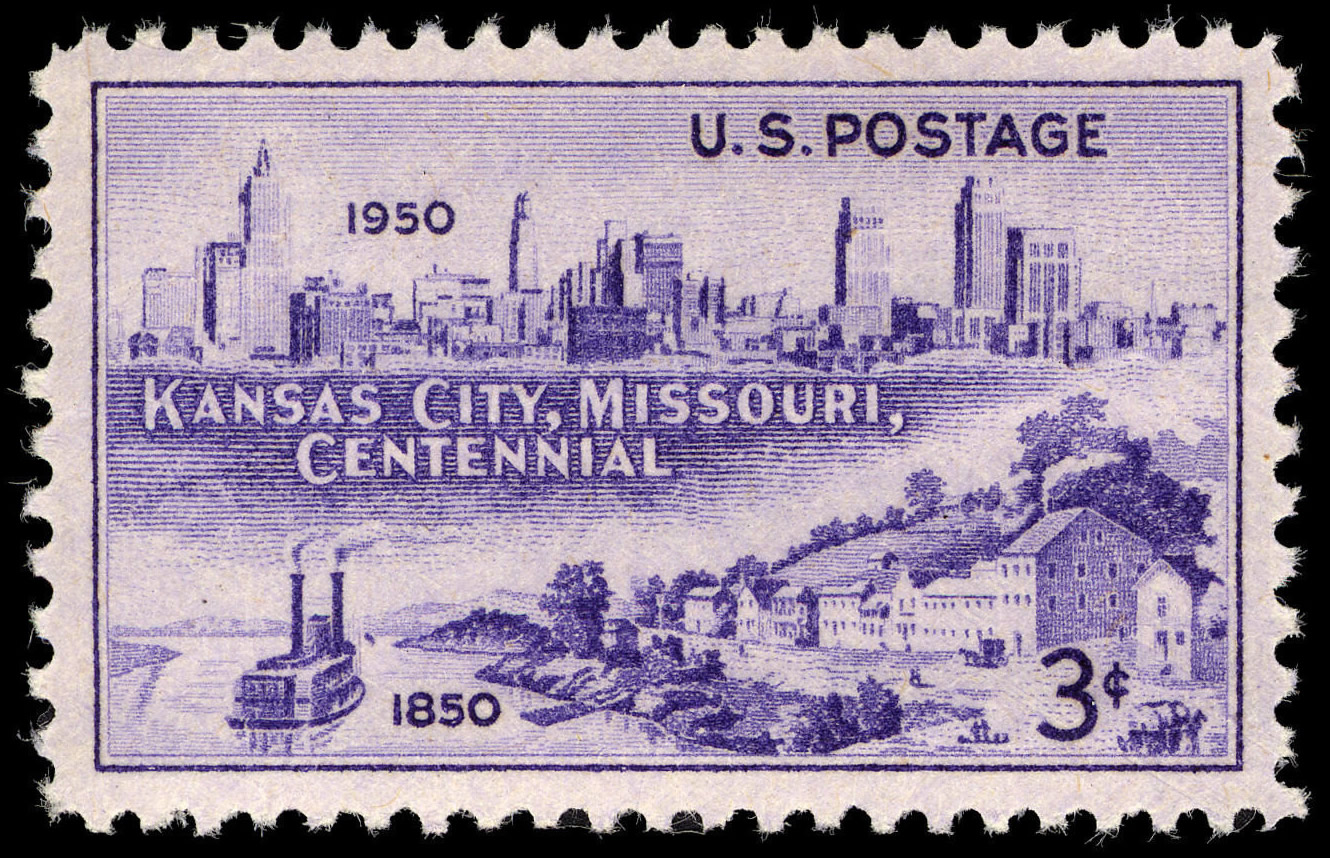
A 1950 stamp commemorates Kansas City's centennial.

Since the 1950s, Kansas City has gone through a transition and tried to shed its Cow Town image. This began when Kansas City was at its height of national attention with the back-to-back Presidencies of Harry Truman and Kansas favorite-son Dwight D. Eisenhower. Events of the period saw the heyday of Roy A. Roberts' influence as editor of the Kansas City Star.

The change began in the early 1950s with the precipitous decline of the railroad due to competition from automobile and jet travel. Union Station, which had lorded over the second busiest rail intersection (next to Chicago), began a rapid decline. The Great Flood of 1951 decimated the Kansas City Stockyards in the West Bottoms. The stockyards (which were also second to Chicago in size) never came back to their full glory as stockyards moved away from urban and unionized centers. In 1955, Kansas City formally began its relationship with major league sports when the Philadelphia Athletics relocated to the city, becoming the Kansas City Athletics, playing at Municipal Stadium.

=== 1960s ===
The 1960s contained many projects coupled with the rapid urban decay of many inner city neighborhoods. During this period, many historic buildings were demolished to make way for parking lots, and office buildings. The area became primarily for business rather than for everyday city life.

During this inner city decay, Kansas City began to annex land and expand its area. In the process, Kansas City eventually became one of the largest cities in the United States area-wise at 318 square miles (824 km^{2}), while its population decreased by 15,000 between 1950 and 2000. It is still not uncommon to find cattle and corn fields on the extreme edges of Kansas City. In 2000, Kansas City ranked as the 21st largest city in the United States in terms of area, while it placed 40th in population rankings.

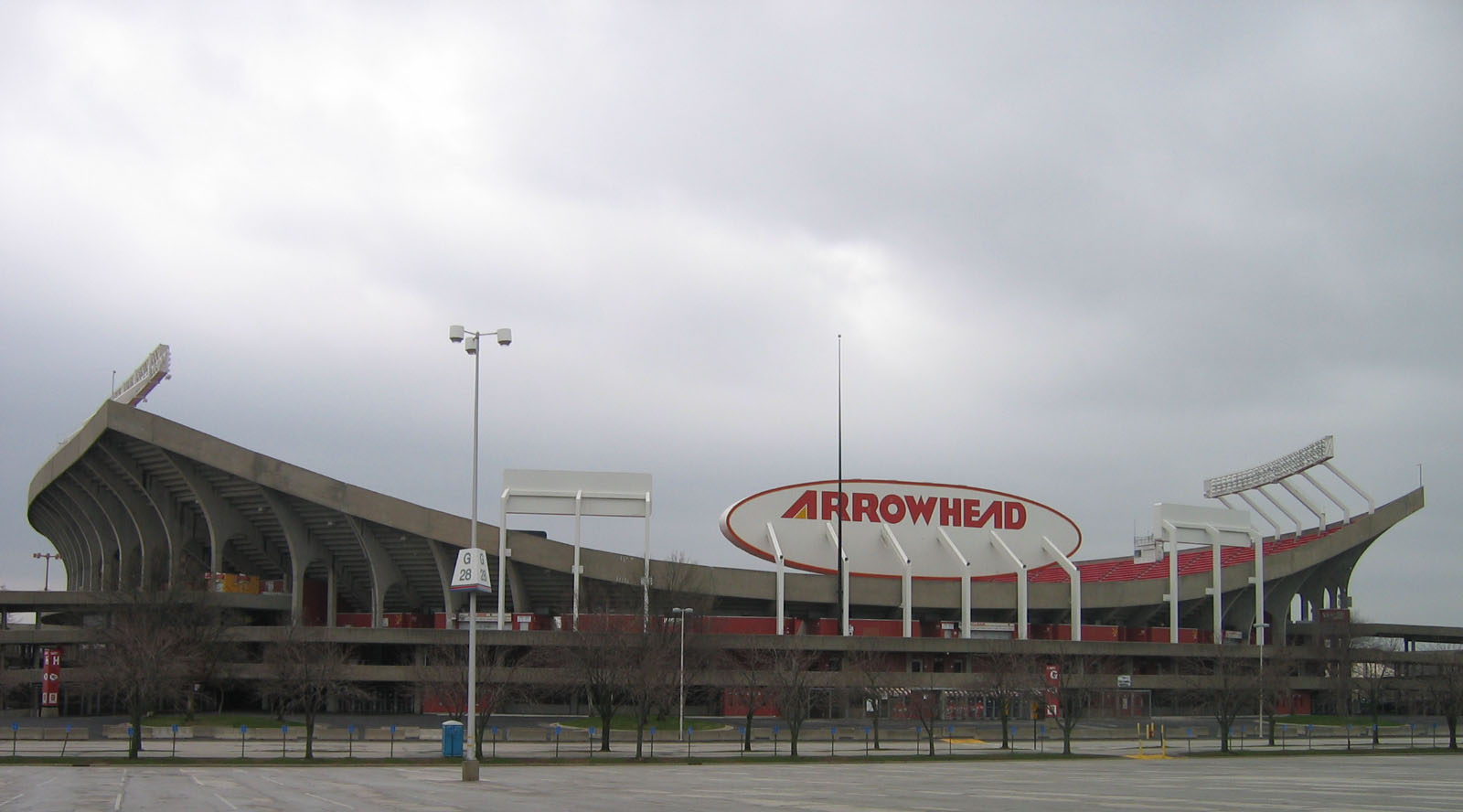
Arrowhead Stadium hosts the Kansas City Chiefs.

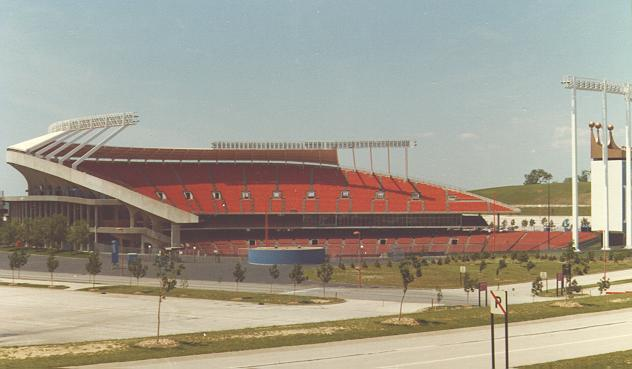
Kauffman Stadium, c. 1981, has since redecorated in the team colors of blue and white.

In 1967, the Kansas City Chiefs participated in the first Super Bowl, losing to the Green Bay Packers. That year, Charlie Finley got permission to move the Kansas City Athletics out of the 1923-era Municipal Stadium. Kansas City responded to these developments by approving a bond issue to build the Truman Sports Complex on the extreme suburban eastern edge of the city by the intersection of Interstates 70 and 435. The construction of the complex was so successful that many major league ballparks and football stadiums have been designed in accordance with the Truman Complex master plan, and most have been designed by Kansas City architects.

Also in 1967, work began on the Crown Center complex located around the headquarters of Hallmark Cards. Another development in the 1960s was the approval of a bond issue to move the city's main airport from Kansas City Downtown Airport to the TWA Kansas City Overhaul Base at what was formerly called Mid-Continent International Airport – now called Kansas City International Airport (but which is referred to in baggage tags by its original abbreviation of MCI). Although Kansas City continued to expand outward in the 1960s, the inner city endured numerous heartbreaks, fires and a 1968 riot that followed the assassination of Martin Luther King Jr. White flight continued on a large scale, ironically, resegregating the city even further than it was before the Civil Rights Movement.

=== 1970s ===
The first half of the 1970s was dominated by Kansas City's ambitious urban renewal projects that were showcased when the city hosted the 1976 Republican National Convention. Though these projects did little to bring people back to the city, they removed many historic buildings in favor of more parking, office structures, and public housing projects.

==== New arenas and teams ====
After Charlie Finley moved the Kansas City Athletics to Oakland, California, Missouri Senator Stuart Symington threatened to remove professional baseball's antitrust exemption. Major League Baseball responded by awarding an expansion team to Kansas City which started play in 1969 under Ewing Kauffman. The Royals had winning seasons by 1971 and moved into their new home in the Truman Sports Complex at Royals Stadium (now Kauffman Stadium) in 1973, beginning a decade in which they appeared in the World Series two times (winning once) and won six American League West division titles. In 1972, the Kansas City Chiefs played their first game at the new Arrowhead Stadium. Ironically the Chiefs football franchise, who had defined Kansas City in the 1960s and those heady days at Municipal Stadium, went into a decline, having only two winning seasons between 1974 and 1988 and participating in only one playoff game from 1972 through 1989.

In 1972, Kansas City acquired a National Basketball Association team, the Cincinnati Royals, with promises of building a new indoor arena. Kemper Arena, which was the first major project by architect Helmut Jahn, was built in 18 months from 1973 to 1974 at the former location of the Kansas City Stockyards in the West Bottoms. Its construction was financed by general obligation bonds, donated land from the stockyards, donations from the American Royal and R. Crosby Kemper Sr. The arena was considered an architectural gem because of fast-track construction, and the fact that with external supports, there were no obstructions to sight lines. The arena was seen as the crowning achievement for luring the 1976 Republican Convention. The arena also resulted in Kansas City being awarded a National Hockey League expansion team, the Kansas City Scouts, which began play in 1974.

==== KCI Airport ====
The Kansas City Downtown Airport, which was built initially during the Pendergast in the Missouri River bottoms immediately north of downtown, was convenient. However, it lacked room for expansion and jets landing and taking off had to avoid the 200-foot (61 m) high bluffs, and the neighborhood of Quality Hill at its south edge. TWA, which was headquartered in Kansas City at the time, had an overhaul base with a landing strip surrounded by open farm land 15 miles (24 km) north of downtown in rural Platte County, Missouri. The airport was listed on maps as Mid-Continent International Airport.

In 1966 voters approved a $150 million bond issue to move the city's main airport to an expanded Mid-Continent. However, the city did not annex the area, and instead the small town of Platte City, Missouri did. Following a series of court battles, Kansas City eventually annexed the airport and selected architectural firm Kivett and Myers to design it, which was dedicated in 1972. Almost all the airlines that were hubbed at the old facility moved to the new airport, which was renamed Kansas City International Airport. The international designation was applied because of jets at the airport that traveled to and from Mexico. The "MCI" abbreviation remained because it was an existing airport and had already been listed on navigation charts.

On November 7, 2017, two weeks after KCI's 45th anniversary, Kansas City Missouri voters overwhelmingly approved a new privately financed and constructed single terminal at KCI. The New Terminal replaced the existing decrepit "Clover Leaf Terminals" in 2023.

==== River Quay ====
One of the most tragic times during this period occurred when a gangland war broke out among the Kansas City Mafia over control of the newly created and thriving River Quay entertainment district, and control over mob skimming at the Stardust Resort & Casino in Las Vegas. In the process, several mobsters were killed and three buildings were blown up in the River Quay, which effectively ended its function as Kansas City's entertainment center. The battle ended the era of mob control of the Las Vegas casinos.

The River Quay in the City Market area along the Missouri River on the north edge of Downtown Kansas City, had been a 1970s urban renewal project to offer a more family friendly entertainment complex based on the city's jazz heritage, replacing the establishments along 12th Street which had deteriorated into a center for crime, drugs, and prostitution. The battle over mob skimming in Las Vegas was highlighted in the book Casino and its based upon movie by Nicholas Pileggi.

==== Big storms ====
Although the Kansas City area, which is in Tornado Alley, is usually hit with at least one and often many more tornadoes each year, two major non-tornadic storms had profound effects on the city. On September 12, 1977, following a soggy summer, 16 inches (410 millimetres) of rain fell on Kansas City, causing severe flooding across the entire region. The most dramatic flooding was in the Country Club Plaza neighborhood, along Brush Creek. The storm killed 25 people, and caused nearly $100 million in property damage. On June 4, 1979, a severe thunderstorm that moved through the city that evening collapsed the roof of Kemper Arena. As the arena was not holding an event that night, no one was injured at the facility. Initial reports indicated that the collapse was the result of a downburst. However, an investigation later revealed that heavy rain from the storm had collected on the arena's roof, to the point where the supports were unable to handle the weight of the pooled water coupled with high winds that rocked its exterior skeleton. The arena was repaired and reopened in early 1980.

== Small market major league ==
Kansas City's grandiose dreams began to diminish in the 1980s as TWA and the major league hockey and basketball teams left and the NCAA stopped holding its Final Four games in the city. The Kansas City Scouts were unable to create the same buzz as fellow NHL franchise, the St. Louis Blues, and relocated to Denver in 1976 to become the Colorado Rockies (which later became the New Jersey Devils in 1982). In 1986, the Kansas City Kings were relocated to Sacramento, California to become the Sacramento Kings. Kansas City began to settle into the fact that it was one of the smallest markets with major league teams, ranking #31 by television market size. The period since 1980 has had substantial bond issues by the city to protect its historic buildings, such as Union Station and Liberty Memorial, and to make major improvements to Kansas City International Airport and the Truman Sports Complex. Kansas City then had the biggest building boom in downtown since the Pendergast era.

=== 1980s ===
==== Desegregation case ====
The single most divisive issue in Kansas City in the 1980s and 1990s was a school desegregation case that spanned three decades, cost millions of dollars, be argued before the U.S. Supreme Court and be featured in a profile on the CBS newsmagazine 60 Minutes about good intentions gone awry. By 1970 the Kansas City school district had experienced massive white and middle-class black flight that left it with a smaller tax base and a severe money shortage. The district increasingly depended on federal funding and could not afford to turn down large federal grants that required it to integrate faster. "Ultimately, the desegregation that was accomplished in Kansas City was far too little and came far too late, after the district had lost most of its white students to the suburbs", says historian Peter Moran.

The legal case began in 1977 when the Kansas City, Missouri School District sued its neighboring districts for funds to help it desegregate its schools. In the ensuing court battle, Kansas City's school system itself was put under a federal court judge guidance; the judge then proceeded to order tax increases to improve the quality of the schools as the system built its network of magnet schools, including two high schools, Lincoln College Preparatory Academy and Paseo Academy. The battle dragged in the entire state of Missouri as schools outside the metropolitan area argued that they should not have to pay for Kansas City area schools. Further, Kansas City residents were angered over plans to bus students an hour or more each day over the city's vast area.

At the height of the debate, the Kansas City, Missouri district spent more than $11,700 per pupil – the most of any large public school district in the country. Teacher salaries skyrocketed, teacher-student ratios were 12 or 13 to 1 and some schools were equipped with Olympic-size swimming pools, wildlife sanctuaries and model United Nations with simultaneous translation capability. The Kansas City, Missouri School District had hoped to stop white flight to attain 35% white enrollment at nearly every school. Instead, over the life of the case, minority enrollment had grown from 67% to 84%. In 1995, the U.S. Supreme Court ruled in the case Missouri v. Jenkins that the courts had exceeded their authority in the case. The case still continued to work its way back through the courts, and in 2003, a federal court judge finally released Kansas City from the judicial oversight.

==== Hyatt Regency walkway collapse ====
One of the biggest showcases of Kansas City metropolitan area's rebirth in this era was Crown Center, which was being built by Hallmark Cards, itself headquartered in the complex by Union Station. The newest addition to the complex was the Hyatt Regency Hotel, where on July 17, 1981, the building's walkway collapsed during a tea dance, which had been set up to bring back the magic of Kansas City jazz. The collapse killed 114 people, making it the deadliest structural collapse in U.S. history at the time, and injured more than 200 others. The Kansas City Star, which had been caught flat-footed after the Kemper Arena collapse, hired a structural engineer following the Hyatt disaster and won a Pulitzer Prize for its coverage of the story.

==== Champions of the World ====
The Kansas City Royals helped boost the city's morale in 1980, when they played their first World Series (in which they were favored to win, but lost to the Philadelphia Phillies four games to two), and then in 1985 in the "I-70 Series" with the intrastate rival St. Louis Cardinals. The 1985, the Royals won the Western Division of the American League for the second consecutive season and the sixth time in ten years. The team improved their record to 91–71 on the strength of their pitching, led by pitcher Bret Saberhagen's Cy Young Award-winning performance. In the playoffs, the Royals went on to win the American League Championship Series for just the second time in its history. Both series were won in seven games after losing three of the first four games.

The championship series against the Cardinals, in which the Royals were the underdog, was forever remembered by umpires' blown calls: one that cost the Royals a run in the 4th, and a "blown call" in Game Six by umpire Don Denkinger that St. Louis fans claim led to the Royals tying the game. However, a dropped foul ball by Jack Clark had as much or more to do with the Royals rally that inning. Regardless, St. Louis had no answer for Saberhagen in the following game as the Royals won their first world championship over the Cardinals in Game 7, 11–0, and the series four games to three.

The Royals returned to the Fall Classic in 2014 losing in the 7th Game to the San Francisco Giants with the tying run just 90 feet away. In 2015, they returned once more and this time defeated the New York Mets in 5 games. The Royals won Game 1 in extra innings, tying for the longest game in World Series history. The Royals also won Game 2 with a complete game by Johnny Cueto, who allowed only one unearned run and two hits. With the series shifting to New York, the Mets won Game 3 with home runs by David Wright and Curtis Granderson. The Royals came from behind to win Game 4 after an error by Daniel Murphy led to a blown save by Jeurys Familia. Game 5 also went into extra innings, where bench player Christian Colón drove in the go-ahead run for the Royals, who clinched the series. Salvador Pérez was named the World Series Most Valuable Player.

=== The 1990s ===
Kansas City grew by 6,399 people during the 1990s, ending two decades of population losses. Emanuel Cleaver became the city's first African-American mayor in 1991, before being elected to Congress in 2004. The opening of the American Jazz Museum, Negro Leagues Baseball Museum, and refurbishing of Union Station as Science City helped memorialize early 20th-century Kansas City.

The suburb of North Kansas City became home to the first casino facility in Missouri when Harrah's North Kansas City opened in September 1994. In 1996, Kansas City received a Major League Soccer franchise, the Kansas City Wiz (later, the Kansas City Wizards from 1997 to 2010 and now known as Sporting Kansas City). The decade closed with Kansas City electing its first female mayor, Kay Waldo Barnes in 1999.

== 21st century ==
=== Population change ===
The City of Kansas City, Missouri's population has steadily increased by more than 24,000 people between the 2000 and 2010 Census to just under 460,000 residents. And by 2017, the city had grown to a population of almost 480,000 people. The Metropolitan Area's population is expected to grow from 2.1 Million in 2010 to over 2.7 Million by 2040. However, the urban core's population has continued to drop significantly, while downtown's has risen dramatically.

=== Downtown KCMO rehabilitation ===
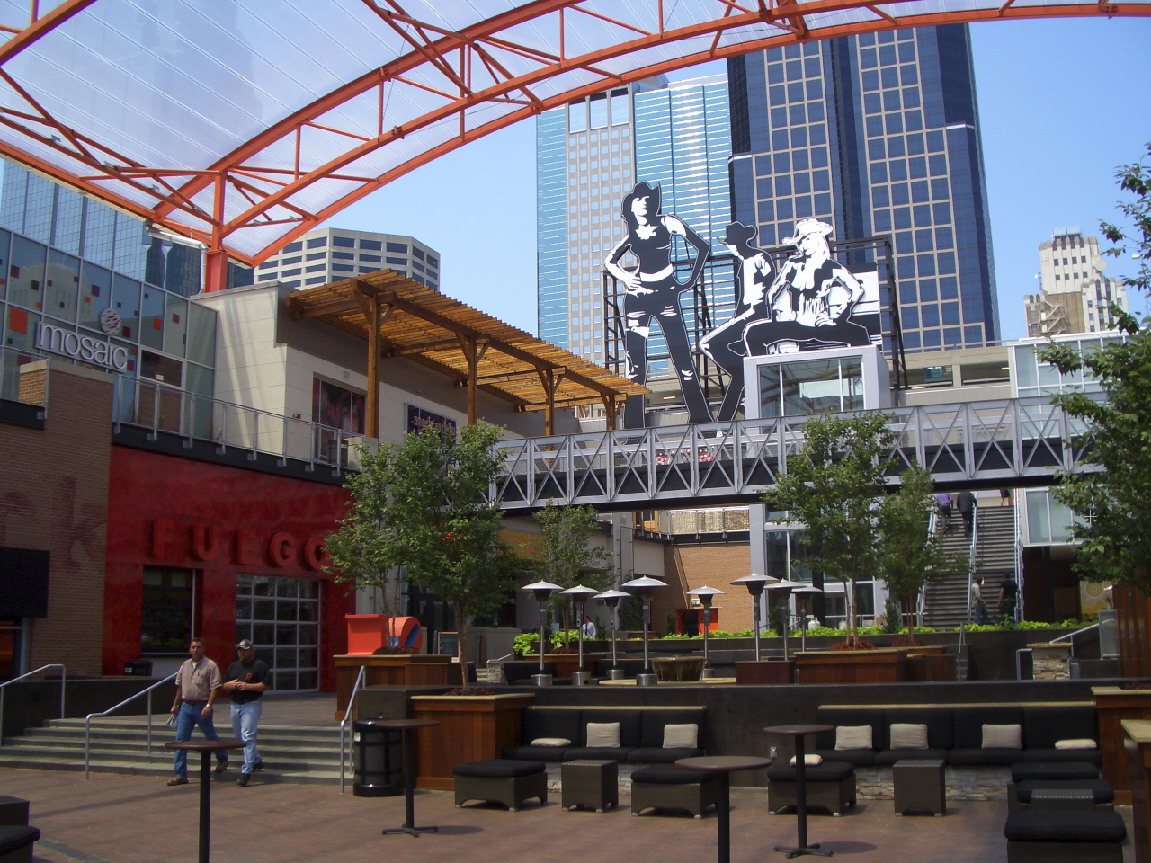
The Power & Light District has a performance space.

Downtown Kansas City, Missouri has had $6 billion in improvements, with main goals including to attract convention and tourist money, office workers, and residents. The Power & Light District was redeveloped where the Sprint Center arena was opened in 2007 to functionally succeed the Kemper Arena. The downtown residential population increased from almost 4,000 residents in the early 2000s to nearly 30,000 in 2017. New apartment complexes like One, Two, and Three Lights, RM West, and 503 Main have begun to reshape Kansas City's skyline. By the mid-2010s, many office buildings were converted to residential uses and the Class A vacancy rate plunged to 12% by 2017. Swiss Re, Virgin Mobile, AutoAlert, and others have begun to move operations to downtown Kansas City from the suburbs and from expensive coastal cities.

=== Transportation ===
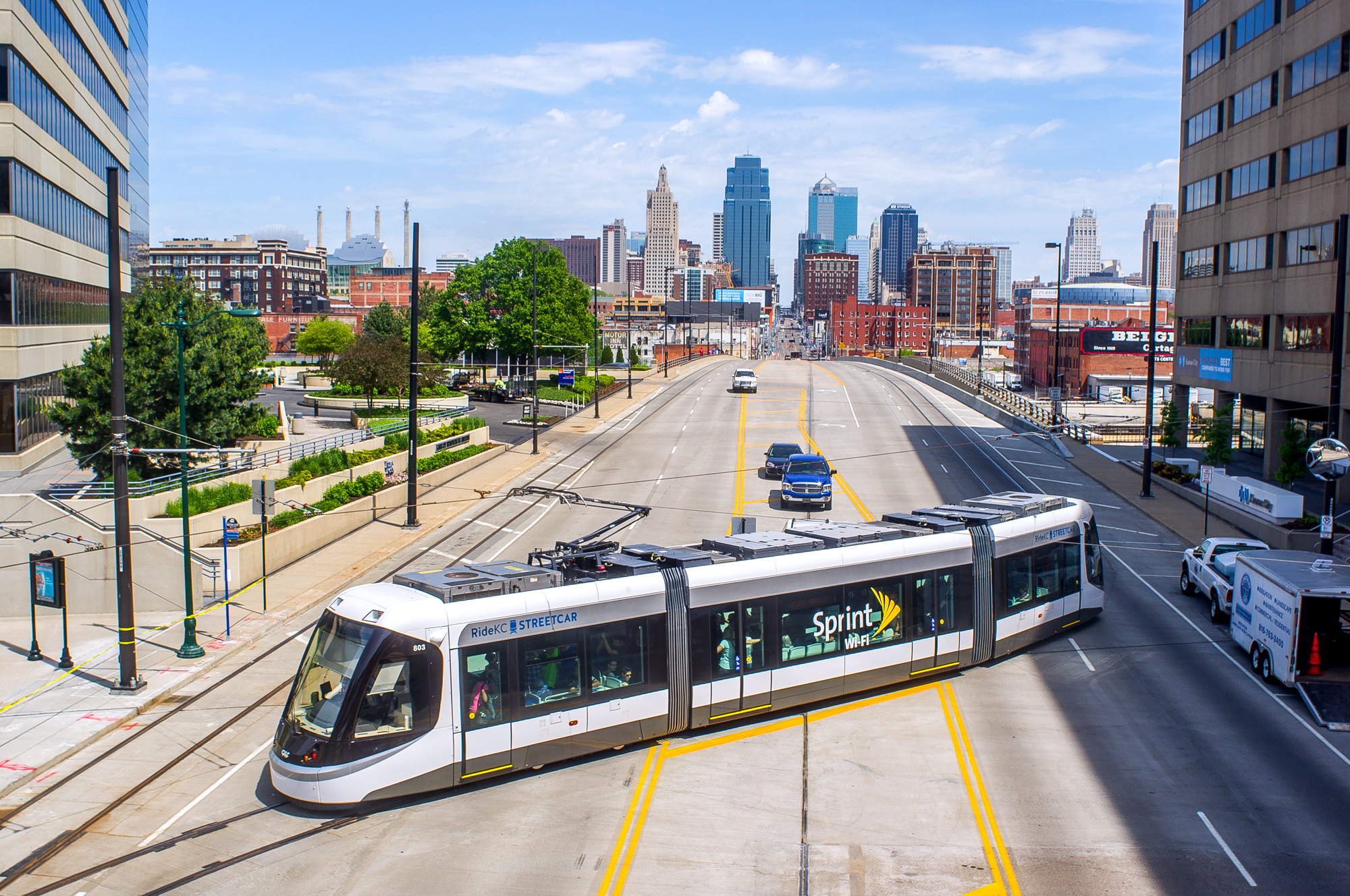
Union Station has a KC Streetcar stop.

In July 2005, the Kansas City Area Transportation Authority (KCATA) launched Kansas City's first bus rapid transit line, the Metro Area Express (MAX), which links the River Market, Downtown, Union Station, Crown Center, and the Country Club Plaza. In 2013, construction began on the first two-mile KC Streetcar line in downtown Kansas City (funded by a $102 million ballot initiative that was passed in 2012) that runs between the River Market and Union Station. It began operation in May 2016.

On November 7, 2017, Kansas City, Missouri voters overwhelmingly approved a new single terminal at Kansas City International Airport by a 75% to 25% margin.

== See also ==
- Timeline of Kansas City, Missouri history
