= William Thornton Kemper Sr. =

Midwestern banker and entrepreneur (1867–1938)

- Born: November 2, 1867; Gallatin, Missouri, U.S.
- Died: January 19, 1938 (aged 70); Kansas City, Missouri, U.S.
- Resting place: Forest Hills Abbey; Forest Hill Calvary Cemetery; Kansas City, Missouri, U.S. 39°0′9.64″N 94°34′24.35″W
- Spouse: Charlotte Crosby (m. 1890)
- Children: 3, including Rufus and William Jr.
- Relatives: R. Crosby Kemper Jr. (grandson); Crosby Kemper III (great-grandson); Sandy Kemper (great-grandson); Ellie Kemper (great-great-granddaughter); Carrie Kemper (great-great-granddaughter)

William Thornton Kemper Sr. (November 2, 1867 – January 19, 1938) was an American banker who was the patriarch of the Missouri Kemper family, which developed both Commerce Bancshares and United Missouri Bank to become a major banking family in the Midwest.

== Life and career ==
Kemper was born on November 2, 1867, in Gallatin, Missouri. He was the son of Sarah Ann Paxton and James Madison Kemper. His mother died in 1875, when he was seven years old. At the age of seventeen, Kemper moved with his family to St. Joseph, Missouri.

Kemper never completed a formal high-school education. At the age of 14 he began work, sweeping the floor at Collins and White, a St. Joseph shoe store, and later became a salesman for Noyes, Norman and Company, a shoe distributor and manufacturer (also in St. Joseph) in which his father was a part owner, covering retailers in eastern Kansas, including Valley Falls, Kansas. In 1885 Kemper moved from St. Joseph to Valley Falls to establish a dry goods store, "Evans & Kemper".

Kemper would spend the next eight years in Valley Falls, where he courted and married Charlotte Crosby and began a career in commercial banking. Valley Falls (then known as "Grasshopper Falls") was a small settlement on the Delaware River about 35 miles due west of Leavenworth, Kansas. In the years following the Civil War, such towns were promoted as commercial hubs in the new network of regional and trans-continental railroads. The northern route of the Atchison, Topeka and Santa Fe railroad was built through Valley Falls in 1871, later joined by the Union Pacific and Missouri Pacific.

Kemper's connection with the Crosby family had both business and personal aspects, and may have predated his move to Valley Falls. When he was traveling through eastern Kansas representing Noyes, Norman, one of Kemper's accounts was with A.D. Kendall, a dry-goods retailer initially established by Charlotte Crosby's father, Rufus Henry Crosby (1834-1891).

Kemper's (future) father in law, Rufus Crosby, was a civic and business leader dating from his arrival in Kansas from Maine in 1855, soon after the opening of Kansas Territory to general settlement under the Kansas-Nebraska Act. An outspoken Abolitionist, Crosby was a signer of the first Kansas State Constitution; he commanded a local free-state volunteer militia; his first store in Valley Falls was burned to the ground in 1856 by Border Ruffians (pro-slavery guerrilla fighters). During his three decades in Kansas, Crosby established and operated a newspaper, a dry-goods store and a bank. In 1879, Crosby started the Valley Falls Bank of Deposit, selling his interest in the store to his partner and brother-in-law, Alvin Kendall.

In 1887, Kemper joined Rufus Crosby's bank as cashier, while also remaining active his other business activities. He married Charlotte Crosby in 1890, and became a partner in the Crosby bank in September 1891. Soon after Rufus Crosby's death in December of that same year, the Valley Falls bank was purchased by A.D. Kendall (and eventually re-chartered as The Kendall State Bank).

=== Moving to Kansas City ===
Kemper and his wife moved to Kansas City, Missouri, in 1893.

Soon after his arrival in Kansas City, beginning a series of entrepreneurial initiatives, Kemper became a grain trader operating on the Kansas City Board of Trade. In 1893 he established the Kemper Grain Company, a merchant trading company. In 1895, he joined with his uncle Thomas Paxton in the purchase of a Topeka department store. In 1902, he established the Kemper Loan and Investment Company, which had a very broad charter to finance and trade securities and real estate. In 1904, he joined with his father (James Kemper, who had moved to Kansas City that year), in creating the Kemper Mercantile Company, a mail-order catalogue company along the lines of Sears, Roebuck and Montgomery Ward. And in 1905, he invested in a grain elevator, which in 1908 became the Kemper Mill and Elevator Company.

Kemper was involved in leadership of multiple municipal, civic and business organizations. In 1900, he served as the president of the Kansas City Board of Trade. In 1904, he ran as the Democratic nominee for Kansas City's mayor. He served as a member of the Police Commission and treasurer of the Kansas City Commercial Club, a club made of local businessmen to promote Kansas City’s growth.

=== Banking ===
In 1906, Kemper was named president of the newly chartered Commerce Trust Company, an affiliate of the National Bank of Commerce. Following the 1916 merger of the National Bank of Commerce into Southwest National Bank of Commerce ("Southwest"), Kemper sold his ownership in the trust company for $740 thousand in 1916 and retired in early 1917. Southwest attempted to operate as two banks with two boards of directors. However, following the death of W.S. Woods (who had led National Bank of Commerce from 1881 until 1908), Kemper returned in July 1917 as chair of both banks. In March 1921 the National Bank of Commerce was finally combined with the Commerce Trust Company into a single corporation, taking the "Commerce Trust" name. A year later, Kemper and others sold control of Commerce Trust to Theodore Gary and Associates. for the price of $220 a share. In late 1932 Kemper and his son James reacquired control of the Commerce Trust at $86 a share.

Kemper's sons followed him into banking: in 1921 In 1919 R. Crosby Kemper became president of City Center Bank, a bank Kemper had acquired personally in April 1918 (and would later become City National Bank, then UMB Financial), which he would continue to lead for 45 years until succeeded by his son, R. Crosby Kemper Jr in 1966. James M. Kemper joined Commerce Trust as treasurer in 1924; he led Commerce Trust from 1925 to 1964, succeeded by his son, James Kemper Jr.

=== Other business activities: the Orient Railroad ===
In 1917, Kemper was appointed receiver for the bankrupt assets of the Kansas City, Mexico & Orient Railroad, a railroad system conceived and promoted by Arthur Stillwell in 1900 to link Kansas City by rail to the Pacific ocean port of Topolobampo on the west coast of Mexico, but which was never fully completed. Kemper's receivership was its second attempt at reorganization following insolvency and bankruptcy. In May 1923, oil was discovered along the railroad's West Texas service area. However, in March 1924 the U.S. Government ordered that the Orient be sold at auction to satisfy previous loans and accrued interest. Kemper and Clifford Histed were successful bidders in that auction, with a bid of $3 million (which was approximately the amount of government debt). The Orient's final reorganization (in August 1927) provided noteholders 35 thousand common shares through subscription based on their share of the debt, valued at $71.60 per share ($2.5 million). In 1928, Kemper and Histed offered the Orient for sale to the Atchison, Topeka and Santa Fe Railway, which offered $414.50 per share, for a total value of $12.4 million.

=== Political activities ===
Kemper's history was intertwined with that of Harry S. Truman. Truman's father, John Anderson Truman, traded grain commodities futures alongside Kemper until John Truman lost his fortune. John took Harry, then a teenager, to the local Democratic functions in Kansas City where Kemper was also in attendance. Kemper arranged for Truman to be a page at the 1900 Democratic National Convention in Kansas City. As a young man Harry would go to work in the National Bank of Commerce, 1903–1905, where Kemper was a director. In 1934 during Truman's first run for the United States Senate, Kemper bought the assets of the failed Continental National Bank which included the mortgage on Truman's failed haberdashery and in turn allowed Truman to retire it for $1,000 (while at the same time also contributing $1,000 to Truman's campaign).

=== Personal life ===
Kemper and Charlotte had three children: Rufus Crosby Kemper Sr. (1892-1972); James Madison Kemper Sr. (1894-1965); and William Thornton Kemper Jr. (1902-1989). He and Charlotte lived at 1007 Westover Road in Kansas City from 1912 until his death in 1938. He is buried in a crypt in Forest Hills Abbey, in the Forest Hill Calvary Cemetery in Kansas City. He is the great-great-grandfather of actress Ellie Kemper and writer Carrie Kemper.

== Sources ==
- Roush, Chris (2015). Building Commerce. Essex Publishing. ISBN 978-1-936713-10-3.
- Schondelmeyer, Brent (1986). Building a First Class Bank - The Story of UMB. UMB Financial.
- Kerr, John (1968). Destination Topolobampo. Golden West Books.
- Garwood, Darrell (1948). Crossroads of America: The Story of Kansas City. W W Norton & Co.
- William T. Kemper resources at the Kansas City Public Library
- Caldwell County Oral History: James M. Kemper - Hamilton Merchant in the Sixties
- Kendall State Bank History
- Kansas Heritage: Atchison, Topeka & Santa Fe Railroad
- Ferrell, Robert Hugh (1996). Harry S. Truman: A Life. University of Missouri Press. Columbia, Missouri. ISBN 0-8262-1050-3.
- McCullough, David (1992). Truman. Simon and Schuster New York. ISBN 0-671-86920-5.
