= Rufus Crosby Kemper Sr. =

American banker (1892–1972)

- Born: 1892; Valley Falls, Kansas, U.S.
- Died: 1972 (aged 79–80)
- Occupation: Banker
- Children: R. Crosby Kemper Jr.
- Father: William Thornton Kemper Sr.
- Relatives: William Thornton Kemper Jr. (brother); Crosby Kemper III (grandson); Sandy Kemper (grandson)

Rufus Crosby Kemper Sr. (1892–1972) was an American banker. He is known for expanding City Center Bank, acquired by his father, from a three-man operation with $600,000 in deposits into UMB Financial Corporation, with $300 million in deposits, during his tenure from 1919 to September 1967.

Kemper is a great-grand-uncle of actress Ellie Kemper (born 1980).

== Early life ==
Rufus Crosby Kemper was born in 1892 in Valley Falls, Kansas. His father, William Thornton Kemper Sr., bought City Center Bank (which was founded in 1913) during World War I.

== Career ==
William first appointed Crosby's younger brother James M. Kemper president of the bank in 1919. However, James resigned a month later and went on to become president of rival Commerce Bancshares. Rufus became president of the bank, a position he held until 1959, when his son R. Crosby Kemper Jr. took over. William remained a director until September 1967.

== Philanthropy ==
Kemper contributed substantially to philanthropies in the Kansas City Metropolitan Area and Kemper Arena is named for him.

Crosby also served as a regent at Rockhurst University, president of Interstate Securities, and director of Kansas City Title & Trust Company.
