= C2FO =

American financial technology company

- Type: Private
- Industry: Financial technology
- Founded: 2008
- Founder: Sandy Kemper
- Headquarters: Kansas City, Missouri
- Website: www.c2fo.com

C2FO is a Kansas City, Missouri based financial technology company that operates a working capital finance platform that allows businesses to access funds that are tied up in accounts receivable.

== History ==
The company was founded as Pollenware in January 2008 by Sandy Kemper, former CEO of UMB Financial Corporation. The name was subsequently changed to C2FO, an acronym describing the collaborative cash flow optimization services the company's platform provided.

C2FO posted its first $1 billion quarter in the fourth quarter of 2013. It experienced growth during 2014, handling $2.9 billion worth of transactions in the fourth quarter of 2014, with $1.4 billion of that happening in December.

In October 2019, C2FO acquired India's largest early payment platform, Priority Vendor. In the fourth quarter of 2019, C2FO achieved an annualized funding run rate of $39B. In March 2020, C2FO claimed it had accelerated more than $100B in payments for companies.

C2FO announced partnering with Experian in February 2021 to provide working capital to Experian vendors.

== Funding ==
The first C2FO market clearing took place in 2010, and received backing of venture firm Union Square Ventures, known for investing in companies like Twitter and Zynga. In 2015, C2FO completed a $40M round of equity funding led by Temasek Holdings, a global investment company based in Singapore. Temasek joined a list of C2FO investors including Union Square Ventures, OPENAIR Equity Partners, and Mithril Capital. In Q1 2016, Citi Ventures became the newest investor. In early 2018, C2FO completed a $100M funding round led by Allianz X and Mubadala Investment Company, along with strong participation from existing C2FO investors: Temasek, Union Square Ventures, and Mithril Capital.

== Office locations ==
C2FO is headquartered in Kansas City, Missouri and reports operations in an additional nine locations worldwide.
