= WCPX =

WCPX may refer to:

- WCPX-TV, a television station in Chicago, Illinois, United States
- WKMG-TV, a television station in Orlando, Florida, United States that previously held the WCPX-TV callsign
