= Commerce Bancshares =

Regional banking company

Commerce Bancshares, Inc.
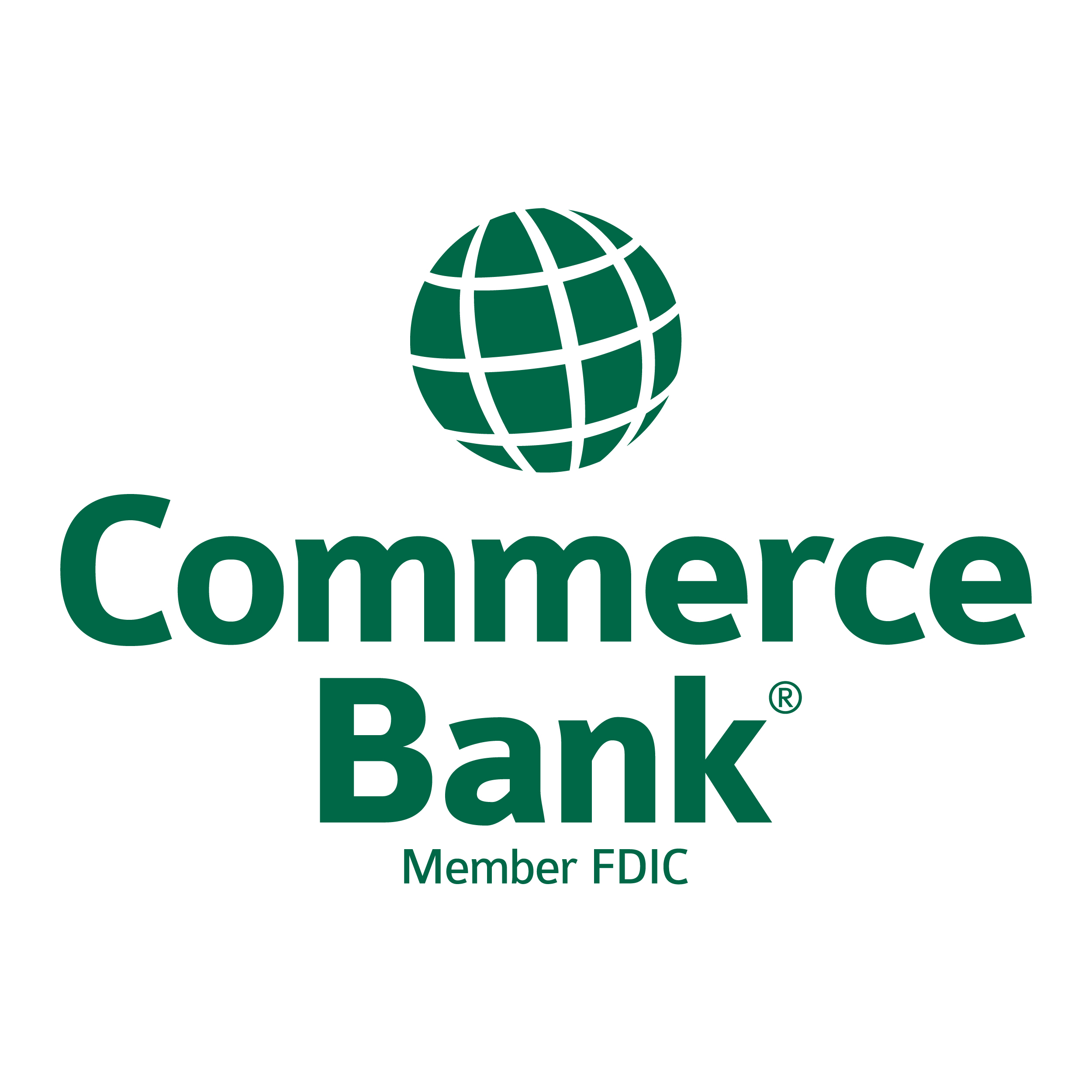
- Type: Public
- Traded as: Nasdaq: CBSH; S&P 400 Component
- Industry: Financial services
- Founded: 1865; 161 years ago
- Headquarters: Kansas City, Missouri, U.S.
- Key people: David W. Kemper (executive chairman); John W. Kemper (president and CEO)
- Products: Banking
- Revenue: ▲US$1.656 billion (fiscal year ended December 31, 2024)
- Operating income: ▲US$679 million (fiscal year ended December 31, 2024)
- Net income: ▲US$526 million (fiscal year ended December 31, 2024)
- Total assets: ▲US$31.997 billion (fiscal year ended December 31, 2024)
- Total equity: ▲US$3.332 billion (fiscal year ended December 31, 2024)
- Number of employees: 4,693 (2024)
- Website: www.commercebank.com

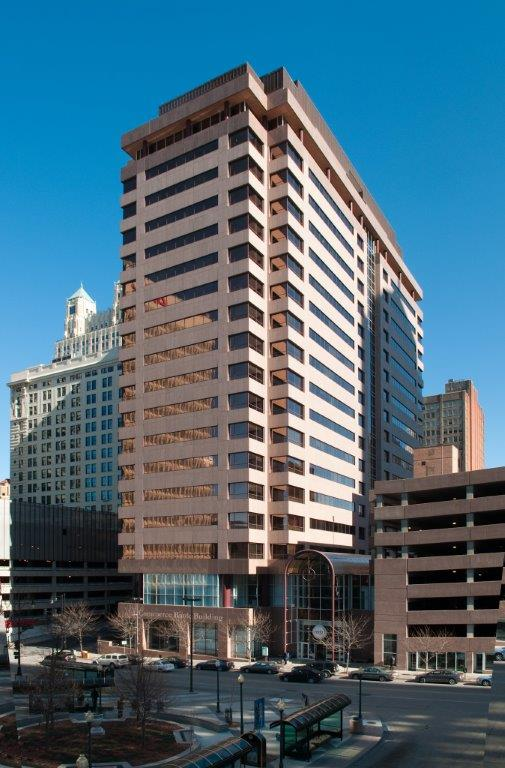
The tower at 1000 Walnut in Kansas City is one of two principal offices for Missouri-based Commerce Bank.

Commerce Bancshares, Inc. is a regional bank holding company headquartered in Missouri, with principal offices in Kansas City and St. Louis. It is the corporate parent of Commerce Bank, which offers a diversified line of financial services, including business and personal banking, wealth management and investments through its affiliated companies.

Commerce Bank's consumer banking serves more than 800,000 households through more than 140 branches and 250 ATM locations across Missouri, Kansas, Illinois, Oklahoma and Colorado with operating subsidiaries involved in mortgage banking, credit-related insurance, venture capital and real estate activities.

As of September 30, 2025, Commerce Bank was the 64th largest commercial bank in the United States, as reported by the Federal Reserve Bank.

== History ==
Commerce was founded by Francis Reid Long with $10,000 in capital in 1865, just as communities were rebuilding during post-Civil War Reconstruction. Originally known as the Kansas City Savings Association, it was acquired in 1881 by Dr. William Stone Woods and renamed the National Bank of Commerce, claiming at the time to be the largest bank west of Chicago. Harry Truman, the 33rd President of the United States, worked as a clerk and cashier at the bank in the early 1900s. When describing Dr. Woods, Truman once said, "There are dozens of stories about his close accounting of the nickels and pennies, but if he chose to back a man, he stayed with him through thick and thin if that man had energy and character." Dr. Woods would go on to transform the Kansas City bank into a modern financial institution.

Truman's housemate at the time was fellow Commerce employee Arthur Eisenhower, brother of future war hero and President Dwight D. Eisenhower. Arthur went on to work at Commerce for more than 50 years.

The bank became Commerce Bank in 1903 with William Thornton Kemper Sr. as its first president. Kemper set up one of his sons, James M. Kemper, at Commerce and his other son, Rufus Crosby Kemper Sr., at the competing City Center Bank, which later became UMB Financial Corporation. Members of the Kemper family still play a dominant role at both banks. They also are a major force in Missouri philanthropies, with their names attached to numerous buildings throughout the state, including Kemper Arena.

In 1928, Commerce opened the nation's first 24-hour banking transit department, where checks or transit items drawn from out-of-town banks could be cleared and collected. The bank was an early adopter in other ways as well. In 1955, it installed the latest moving "electric stairs" in the Walnut Lobby of its Kansas City headquarters.

After World War II, Commerce Bank continued to play an important role in the Midwest's growth. It funded business growth, working with H&R Block, Sprint (originally called United Utilities), and Trans World Airlines, which had its main overhaul base at Kansas City International Airport. In 1954, the Commerce Trust Company allowed Walt Disney and his wife, Lillian, to take out a $60,000 loan against Disney's life insurance policy to help fund the development of a new theme park Disney envisioned. Disneyland opened in California a year later, and by the end of its first year in operation, the park had already attracted 3.6 million guests.

From the 1960s to the 1990s, Commerce grew alongside the American economy, expanding throughout Missouri, Kansas, and Illinois. In 1968, Commerce became the first bank in Missouri to enter the credit card business. In 1969, Commerce helped Ewing Kauffman, owner of Marion Laboratories, buy the Kansas City Royals. Commerce remains the Royals' bank. After a young Johnny Morris opened a bait and tackle shop in the back of his father's liquor store in Springfield, Missouri, Commerce provided the line of credit he needed in 1974 to open a second store in a chain known today throughout North America as Bass Pro Shops. During the 2008 financial crisis, Commerce was the country's sixth largest bank to decline financial assistance from the United States Department of the Treasury and the Troubled Asset Relief Program.

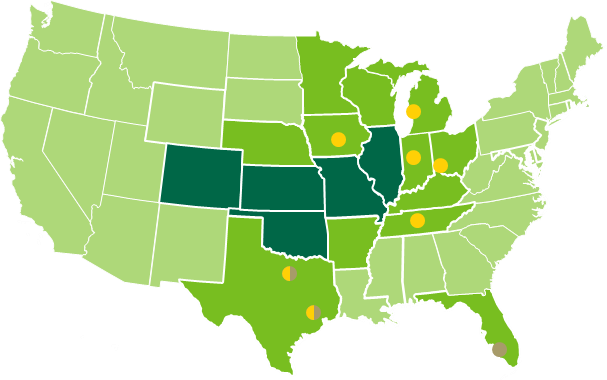
Commerce Bank footprint

Appearing regularly on lists recognizing top banks, Commerce later added Colorado and Oklahoma to its banking footprint, with additional commercial offices throughout the Midwest and commercial payments services available in 48 states. In 2023, Commerce completed Commerce Bank Tower, a 15-story building near Commerce Bank's office building at 8000 Forsyth Blvd. in St. Louis.

On January 1, 2026, Commerce acquired FineMark Holdings, Inc., parent of FineMark National Bank & Trust, in an all-stock transaction valued at approximately $528.5 million. The acquisition expands Commerce's private banking and wealth management business, building on its presence in Florida and adding new locations in Arizona and South Carolina. Former FineMark branches now operate as FineMark Bank & Trust, a division of Commerce Bank.

== Lines of business ==
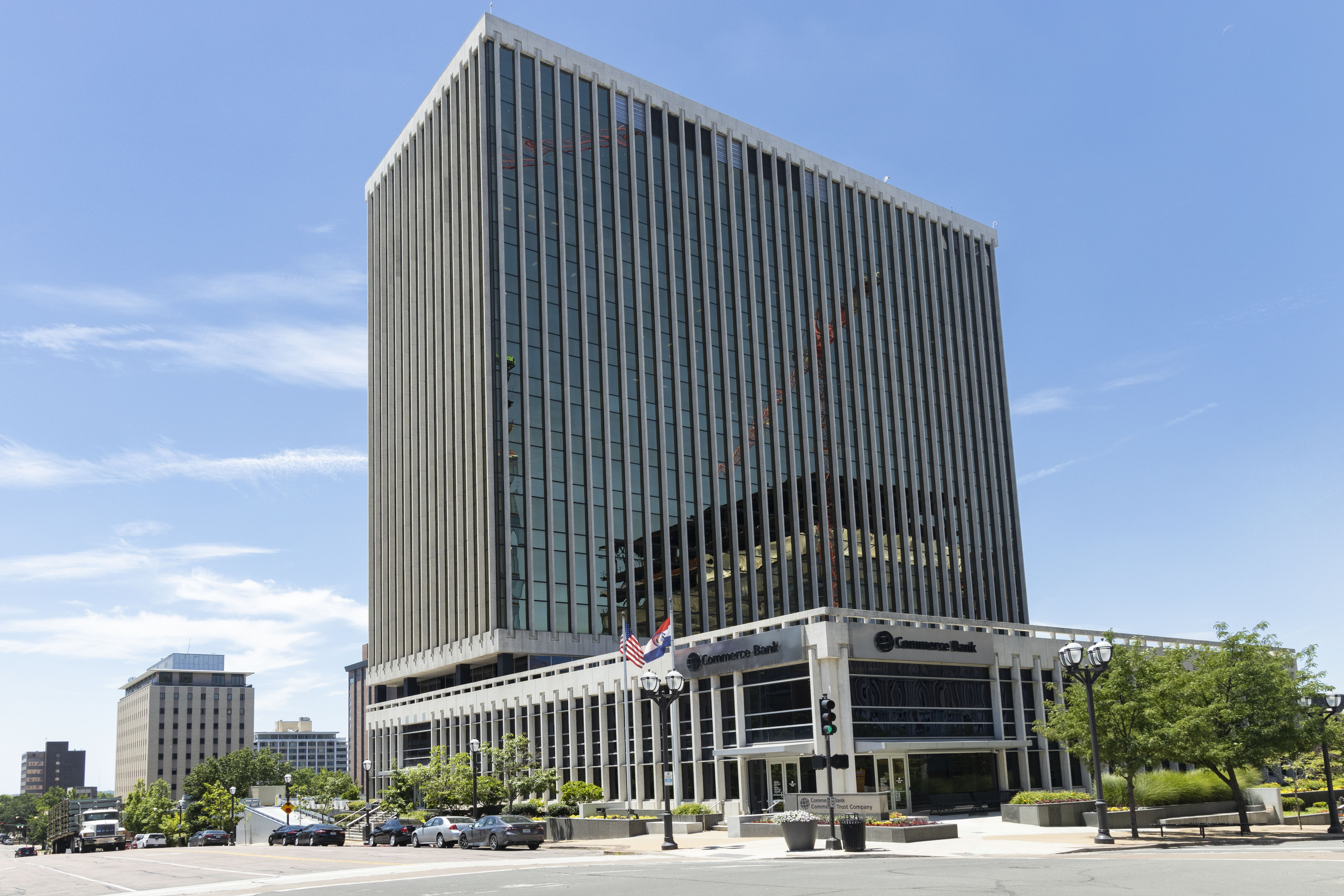
Commerce Bank operates from 8000 and 8001 Forsyth Boulevard in St. Louis, one of two principal offices for the Missouri-based bank.

Commercial Banking – Commerce Bank serves more than 12,000 businesses through its commercial banking and payments solutions. The bank's commercial services include corporate lending, merchant and commercial card products, payment and treasury solutions, leasing and international services, as well as business and government deposit, investment and cash management. The commercial banking business contributed 47% of Commerce Bank's pre-tax income in 2024.

Consumer Banking – Commerce Bank's consumer banking serves more than 800,000 households through 140+ branches, 250+ ATM locations, and digital solutions in online and mobile banking. The bank's consumer services include checking, savings, installment loans, personal mortgages, and debit and credit cards.

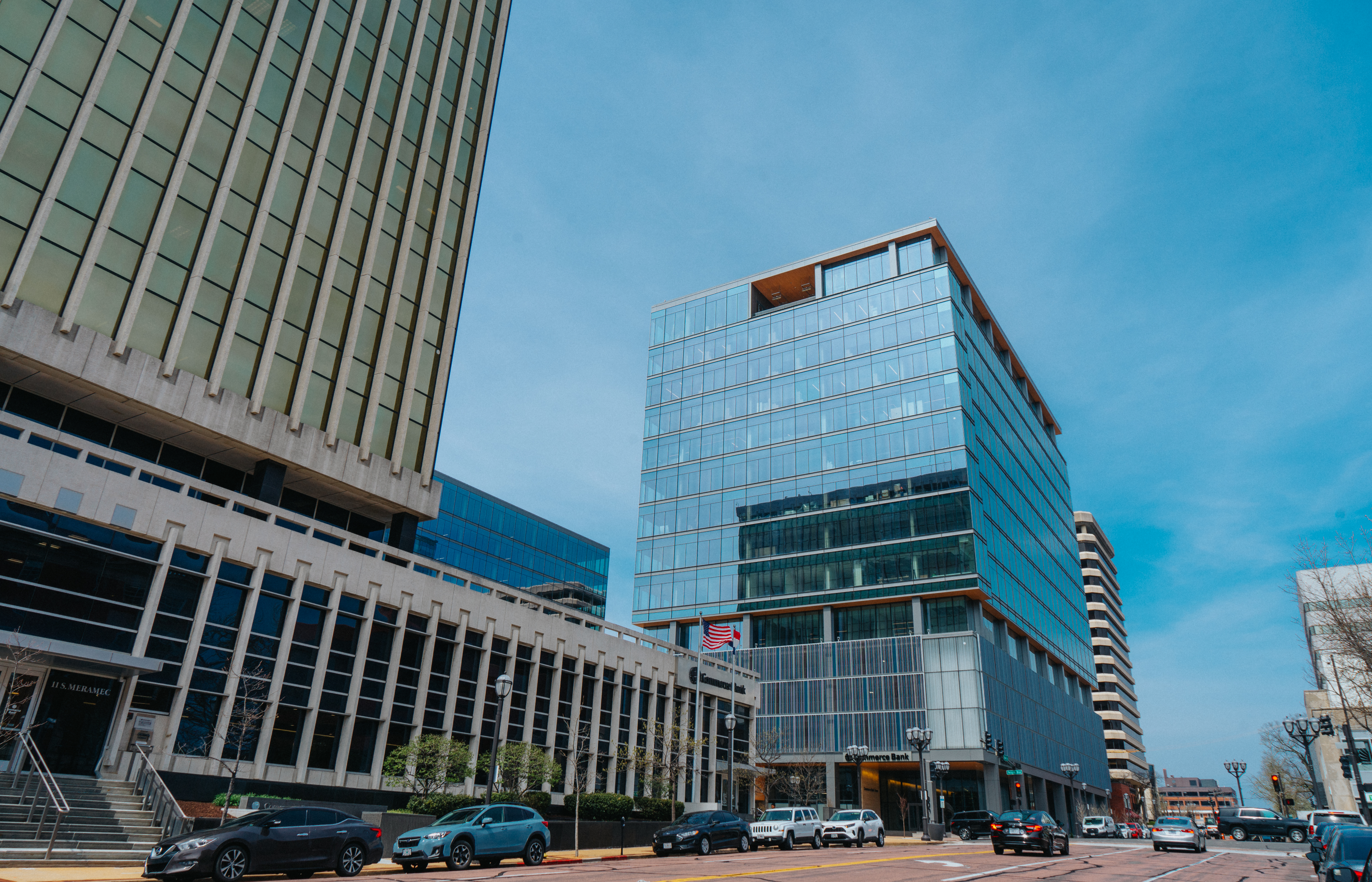
Commerce Bank Tower at 8001 Forsyth Boulevard in St. Louis, Missouri, was completed in 2023.

Private Wealth and Institutional Asset Management – Commerce Trust, a division of Commerce Bank, provides financial and tax planning, investment portfolio management, trust administration, and private banking services to high-net-worth individuals and institutions. Commerce Family Office, an operating unit of Commerce Trust, provides financial and tax planning, investment consulting, trust administration, philanthropy and family governance to ultra-high-net-worth individuals. Commerce Trust ranked 16th in bank-managed trust companies as of June 30, 2025, according to S&P Global Market Intelligence.

== Awards and recognition ==
- Bank Director's Top 25 Banks – In 2025, Bank Director ranked Commerce Bank fifth on its annual RankingBanking study of the 300 largest publicly traded banks.
- Forbes' World's Best Banks – In 2023, Forbes named Commerce Bank one of the World's Best Banks for the fifth consecutive year.
- Forbes' America's Best Banks – Commerce was named to Forbes' 2025 list of America's Best Banks, ranking 37th in the nation and second in Missouri.
- Forbes' Best Employer by State: Missouri – In 2024, Commerce Bank was named to Forbes America's Best Employers by State list in Missouri.
- Forbes' America's Best Midsize Employers – In 2024, Commerce Bank was recognized on Forbes' America's Best Midsize Employers List for the seventh consecutive year.
- Human Rights Campaign's 2023 Corporate Equality Index (CEI) – In 2023, for the third consecutive year, Commerce Bank was recognized by the Human Rights Campaign's (HRC) Corporate Equality Index (CEI) with a score of 90 out of 100.
- Newsweek's America's Best Regional Bank – Commerce Bank was named to Newsweek's inaugural America's Best Regional Banks and Credit Unions 2024 list. The bank was named to the list again in 2025.
- Newsweek's Greatest Workplaces for Mental Well-Being – In 2025, Commerce Bank was named to Newsweek's list of America's Greatest Workplaces for Mental Well-Being.
- S&P Global Market Intelligence Top 50 Public Banks – Commerce was recognized by S&P Global Market Intelligence as one of the Top U.S. Public Banks based on financial performance in 2024.
- U.S. News & World Report Best Companies to Work For – In 2025, Commerce Bank was included on U.S. News & World Report's lists of "Best Companies to Work For" in the Finance & Insurance sector and in the Midwest for the third consecutive year.
