= WCPX-TV =

Television station in Chicago

- Chicago, Illinois; United States
- Channels: Digital: 34 (UHF); Virtual: 38

Programming
- Affiliations: 38.1: Ion Television; for others, see § Subchannels

Ownership
- Owner: Ion Media; (Ion Television License, LLC)

History
- First air date: May 31, 1976
- Former call signs: Analog: WCFC-TV (1976–1998); Digital: WCPX-DT (2000–2009)
- Former channel numbers: Analog: 38 (UHF, 1976–2009); Digital: 43 (UHF, 2000–2019)
- Former affiliations: Religious Ind. (1976–1998)
- Call sign meaning: "Chicago's Pax"

Technical information
- Licensing authority: FCC
- Facility ID: 10981
- ERP: 400 kW
- HAAT: 510 m (1,673 ft)
- Transmitter coordinates: 41°52′44″N 87°38′8″W

Links
- Public license information: Public file; LMS
- Website: iontelevision.com

WCPX-TV (channel 38) is a television station in Chicago, Illinois, United States, broadcasting the Ion Television network. The station is owned by the Ion Media subsidiary of the E. W. Scripps Company, and broadcasts from a transmitter located atop the Willis Tower.

== History ==
=== A construction permit ===
On October 10, 1964, the Chicago Federation of Labor, owner of WCFL (1000 AM, now WMVP), filed for a construction permit to build a new television station on channel 38 in Chicago. Approval was not granted until June 5, 1968. In the four years between application and construction, Field Communications changed its application for channel 38 to channel 32, while competing applicants included a group known as Chicagoland TV and the Warner Bros. film studio. Warner Bros. had dropped out by the time comparative hearings were held in mid-1966. Early progress was made when the antenna was placed atop the John Hancock Center in 1969, and plans for a general-entertainment independent station and studios were broadly laid out in 1970.

In late 1970, however, the Chicago Federation of Labor opted to sell the WCFL-TV construction permit to another Chicago company: Zenith Radio Corporation. Zenith had one reason for pursuing a TV station in Chicago: it had developed a system for subscription television over-the-air. It was not until 1971 that the transaction was filed with the Federal Communications Commission (FCC). The action had one vocal opponent: Chicagoland TV, which had lost in comparative hearing two years prior. When the deal was filed, Chicagoland TV petitioned to deny the transaction and asked for hearings to put its programming proposal against that of Zenith; they argued that subscription television would exclude poorer viewers, important to a group whose own programming plans were for a station targeted at Chicago's minority communities. The transaction lingered so long that Zenith opted out in 1973; it was the second such purchase where Zenith had backed out, after the company had also contracted to buy KWHY-TV in Los Angeles.

With Zenith out of the picture, Chicagoland TV continued to oppose extensions of the WCFL-TV construction permit. On November 18, 1974, the FCC dismissed the Chicago Federation of Labor's request for a time extension; the federation requested the application be reinstated in February 1975.

=== WCFC-TV, "Shining on Chicago" ===
Meanwhile, in 1971, Christian Communications of Chicagoland had been founded, when Pastor Owen C. Carr approached his church's board of directors with a desire to begin a Christian television station for the Chicago area. Carr's then-congregation, The Stone Church, raised $135,000 by the end of September 1973, at which point Christian Communications of Chicagoland was incorporated. The First National Bank of Evergreen Park financed $600,000 for the purchase of needed equipment and a studio. Beating out Chicago's city colleges, Christian Communications struck a deal to buy equipment and receive the construction permit from the Chicago Federation of Labor in June 1975, and the FCC granted the transaction in January 1976.

On May 26, the call letters were officially changed to WCFC (standing for "Winning Chicagoland for Christ"; a -TV suffix was added two years later), and at 5 p.m. on May 31, 1976, from the Olympic Studios on the city's near west side, WCFC signed on with the Holy Bible opened to the first chapter of Genesis, read by Pastor Carr; this was followed by a broadcast of The 700 Club. Jerry Rose, who previously worked for KXTX-TV in Dallas and helped Pat Robertson build that station, was hired as the station's general manager. However, while KXTX and its sister stations were programmed as family-friendly independent stations with some religious programming, WCFC-TV aired no secular fare.

Initially only broadcasting from 6 to 9 p.m. during the week, and from 12 to 9 p.m. on Sundays, the station gradually expanded its broadcast hours; in the fall of 1976, the station was on the air six hours a day, and by 1977, aired for twelve hours a day. In 1982, WCFC began operating on a 24-hour schedule. The next year, it struck a deal to move to a facility built out for the dismantled Catholic Television Network of Chicago on Wacker Drive, relocating from the Kemper Building. Ten years after launching, WCFC-TV had a budget of $5 million and 65 employees.

A locally produced show called Among Friends, hosted by Rose, aired twice a day on weekdays. The station also ran the live, 90-minute version of The 700 Club from 9 to 10:30 a.m. on weekdays, with hour-long rebroadcasts in the evenings and early mornings. It also aired the two-hour PTL Club, repeating the primary hour in the afternoon. WCFC also aired programming from well known national evangelists such as Rex Humbard, Jimmy Swaggart, Kenneth Copeland and Oral Roberts. The station also ran a small amount of Catholic programming. One notable guest on Among Friends was Mother Angelica, whose visit to WCFC inspired her to begin EWTN a couple of years later. The station also ran many Christian children's programs, including among others Joy Junction, Davey and Goliath, Bible Bowl, Sunshine Factory, Circle Square and Superbook, and re-runs of The Roy Rogers Show on Saturday afternoons.

=== WCPX-TV ===
WCFC-TV remained a full-time Christian station well into the 1990s. However, in 1996, Lowell Paxson started shopping for stations to serve as affiliates of his new family-oriented Pax TV network (later renamed i and then Ion Television), and nearly two years into his purchases, he had still not been able to buy a station in Chicago. In January 1998, Paxson Communications struck a deal to purchase WCFC—started in 1976 for just $850,000—for $120 million, with the proceeds from the sale being used to start the Total Living Network (which then began to be carried on WCFC-LP in Rockford, which had been WCFC-TV translator W51CD, as well as KTLN-TV in San Francisco). Upon Pax's launch on August 31, 1998, the call letters were changed to WCPX (the television station in Orlando formerly known as WCPX had changed its call sign to WKMG-TV earlier in the year), and the Christian lineup was cut back to 5 a.m. to 12 p.m. daily to accommodate Pax programming, which aired from 12 p.m. to midnight, and programming from The Worship Network during the overnight hours. The morning Christian programming was gradually cut back from 2002 to 2005; this, as well as cutbacks in Pax's entertainment schedule, had resulted in much of WCPX-TV's schedule, as with Ion's other stations, consisting of infomercials—a situation that has been reversed since 2009, with gradual expansions of Ion's entertainment schedule.

== Technical information ==
=== Subchannels ===
The station's signal is multiplexed:

Subchannels of WCPX-TV
Subchannel	Res.	Short name	Programming
38.1	720p	ION	Ion Television
38.2	720p	Bounce	Bounce TV
38.3	480i	CourtTV	Court TV
38.4	480i	Laff	Laff
38.5	480i	IONPlus	Ion Plus
38.6	480i	Grit	Busted
38.7	480i	GameSho	Game Show Central
38.8	480i	HSN	HSN

=== Analog-to-digital conversion ===
WCPX-TV shut down its analog signal, over UHF channel 38, on June 12, 2009, the official date on which full-power television stations in the United States transitioned from analog to digital broadcasts under federal mandate. The station's digital signal continued to broadcast on its pre-transition UHF channel 43, using virtual channel 38.
