= Crosby Kemper III =

American government official

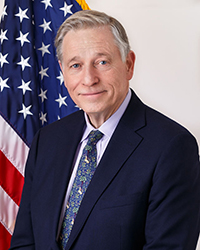
Official portrait, 2020

Rufus Crosby Kemper III (b. Kansas City, Missouri, January 7, 1951) is the former director of the U.S. National Institute of Museum and Library Services (IMLS). Previously director of the Kansas City Public Library from 2005 until 2020, Kemper's other experience includes CEO/Chairman of UMB Financial Corporation.

In 2005, Kemper co-founded the Show-Me Institute with Rex Sinquefield. He chaired the Missouri Commission on the Future of Higher Education and additionally served on various boards, including the Thomas Jefferson Foundation, the Kansas City Symphony, the Black Archives of Mid-America, and acted as founding chairman of the Heart of America Shakespeare Festival. Under his leadership the Kansas City Public Library received the 2008 National Medal for Museum and Library Service, awarded to American libraries and museums with outstanding service to their communities.

== Biography ==
The son of R. Crosby Kemper Jr. and Cynthia Warrick Kemper, he was born and raised in Kansas City, Missouri, then attended Andover, Eton College, and Yale University. His wife was the historian and Yale University professor María Rosa Menocal. He later married Deborah Sandler, general director and CEO of Lyric Opera of Kansas City.

=== Director of the IMLS ===
In November 2019, Kemper was nominated by President Donald Trump to serve as the director of the Institute of Museum and Library Services (IMLS), the primary source of federal support for US libraries and museums. The nomination was supported by the American Library Association, followed by a January 9, 2020, confirmation in the United States Senate for a term of four years.

In July 2023, a joint letter from Senators Marco Rubio, Mike Braun and Kevin Cramer was sent to Crosby, urging him to defund the American Library Association due to what they characterized as "actively discriminating" against Brave Books, a publisher of children's books affiliated with actor and Christian activist Kirk Cameron.
