= Heinrich Kemper (politician, born 1888) =

German politician

Member of the Bundestag
- In office 7 September 1949 – 6 October 1957

Personal details
- Born: 25 February 1888
- Died: 23 August 1962 (aged 74)
- Party: CDU

Heinrich Kemper (25 February 1888 in Siegen – 23 August 1962 in Trier) was a German politician of the Christian Democratic Union (CDU) and former member of the German Bundestag.

== Life ==
From 1930 to 1933 he was member of Landtag of Prussia for Centre Party. He was a member of the German Bundestag from its first election in 1949 to 1957. In parliament he represented the constituency of Trier. From 1946 to 1949, Kemper served as Lord Mayor of the city of Trier.

== Literature ==
Herbst, Ludolf; Jahn, Bruno (2002). Vierhaus, Rudolf (ed.). Biographisches Handbuch der Mitglieder des Deutschen Bundestages. 1949–2002 [Biographical Handbook of the Members of the German Bundestag. 1949–2002] (in German). München: De Gruyter - De Gruyter Saur. p. 1715. ISBN 978-3-11-184511-1.
