= Thomas Kemper =

American brewing company

Thomas Kemper was a brewery that produced root beer, ginger ale, and other craft sodas under the Thomas Kemper Soda Co. label. Formerly owned by Pyramid Breweries, Inc., it was sold in 2007 to Adventure Funds of Portland, Oregon, which ran the company under the Kemper Co. name.

Thomas Kemper Brewing of Poulsbo was sold to Hart Brewing (later known as Pyramid) in 1992. (Thomas Kemper had been founded in 1985 on Bainbridge Island, and began making soft drinks in 1990.)

Thomas Kemper Soda was first brewed by Andy Thomas and Will Kemper (now brewing at Bellingham's Chuckanut) as alternative to beer at an Octoberfest celebration on Bainbridge Island, WA in 1990. The first Thomas Kemper Soda was handcrafted Root Beer. Thomas Kemper Sodas were handcrafted and made with honey (although cane sugar was the primary sweetener), Madagascar vanilla, and other flavors.

The soda came in eight flavors: Root Beer, Vanilla Cream, Orange Cream, Ginger Ale, Grape, Black Cherry, Ginger Peach and Oregon Marionberry. Previously, there were Thomas Kemper varieties of Birch Beer and Cola as well.

== History ==
Thomas Kemper started as a 1980s microbrewery well ahead of its time. The people involved had developed their brewing into an art and, as is standard with brewers, wanted to share it with the world. They grew the local following until the seams burst and moved in to what they considered a large brewing facility. They converted an old dairy farm near Poulsbo, Washington. It became their new brewery. They exploded again. They made Thomas Kemper into a "local" brand known almost exclusively to the Pacific Northwest. (Think Elysian, Silver City, or Sound Brewery). The Kemper beers drew aficionados from afar, and the Friday night fare at the brewery drew the locals. The Thomas Kemper Soda line was an example of fruit not falling far from the tree.

The "beer" and "soda" companies were kept separate and, in the spirit of their founding fathers, provided something for all.

1990: The first batch of Thomas Kemper Soda, Thomas Kemper Root Beer, was created for the Thomas Kemper Oktoberfest. Since 1989, the Thomas Kemper Brewing Company, one of the Northwest's first Microbreweries, held an annual Oktoberfest celebration at their brewery. Starting out as a small event, the Thomas Kemper Oktoberfest soon was adding thousands of extra people to the population of Poulsbo, WA each autumn.

1991: Having done so well at the Thomas Kemper Oktoberfest, the Thomas Kemper Soda Company was formed. With very little advertising or marketing dollars, the young company relies on a "grassroots" campaign to get the word on its sodas out to consumers.

1992: The Thomas Kemper Brewing Company starts to grow, but is in need of the means to do it. Washington's Hart Brewery buys Thomas Kemper and one of the craft beer industry's first mergers takes place. Since the Soda operation had been separated from the parent firm, as a result of a divorce action between firm owners, it was not part of this deal and the folks at Hart will have to wait a few years to re-unite the sibling breweries.

1996: Thomas Kemper Sodas made the Guinness Book of World Records for creating the world's largest root beer float. Using a 4,000-ton carbonating tank and 900 gallons of ice cream, Thomas Kemper made a 2,166.5 gallon root beer float.

1997: Thomas Kemper Sodas are re-united with the Thomas Kemper Beer when Pyramid Breweries Inc. buys Thomas Kemper Sodas. The move provides resources to help the soda company grow.

1997: To kick-off the summer, Thomas Kemper Sodas introduces its Thomas Kemper Orange Cream Soda.

1998: Thomas Kemper introduces its next flavor, Thomas Kemper Black Cherry Soda.

2001: Thomas Kemper launches two new soda fountain classics, Ginger Ale and Grape.

2007: Thomas Kemper is sold by Pyramid.

2011: Thomas Kemper is sold to Big Red, Inc.

2024: Thomas Kemper is no longer in production.

2025: Thomas Kemper®️ is now owned and brewed by Orca Beverage Inc. Orca begins selling the Cream Soda, Orange Cream, and Root Beer.
