= National Bank of Commerce (Kansas City) =

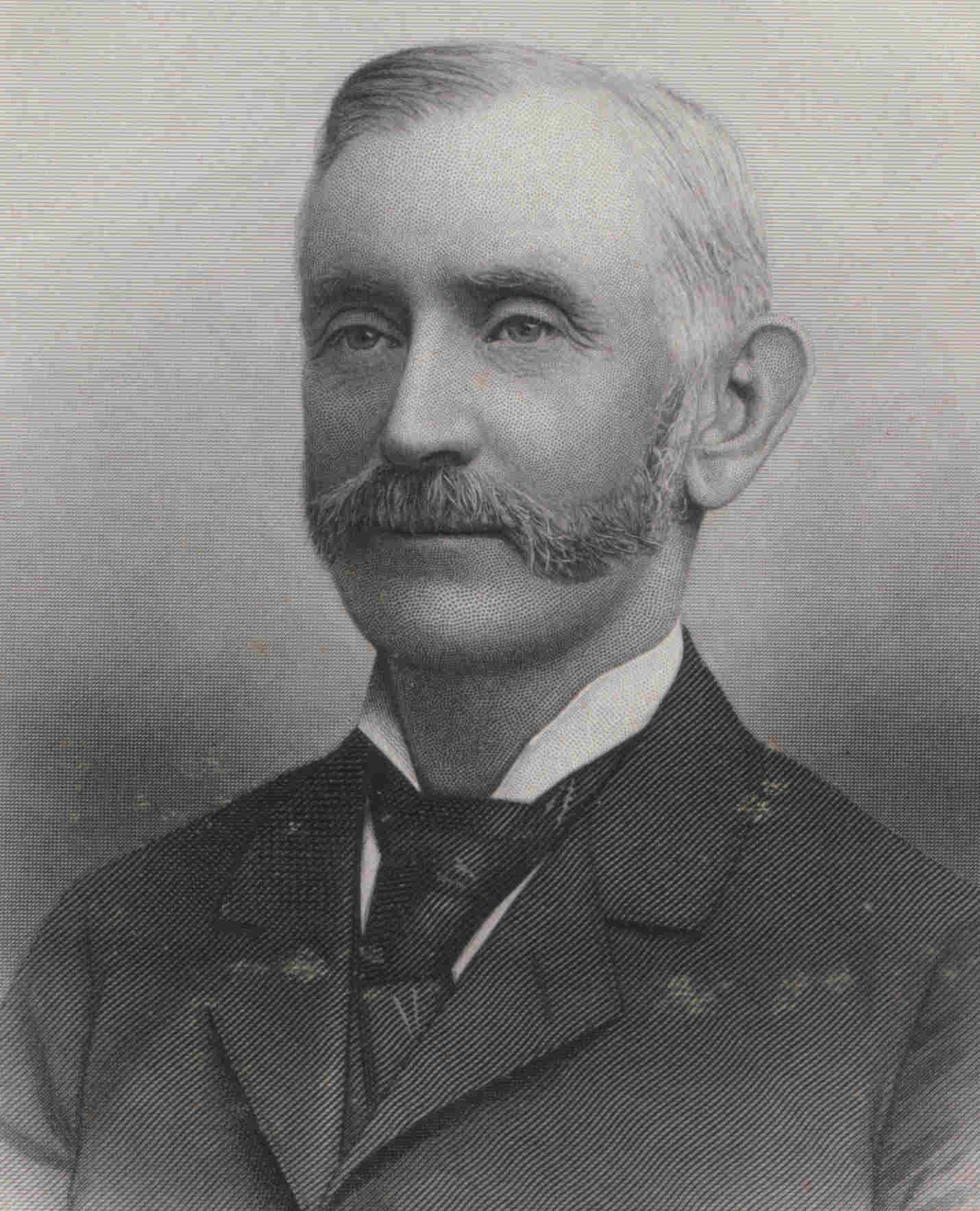
W.S. Woods

The National Bank of Commerce was a U.S. bank of the late 19th and early 20th centuries. It first chartered as the Kansas City Savings Bank in 1865. After a controlling interest was acquired by Dr. William Stone Woods in 1881, the bank became active in financing the regional growth of Kansas City and areas to the southwest, especially in connection with the development of the city as a center of railroad transportation and distribution.

Before establishment of the Federal Reserve System in 1913, business in the United States depended on a system of private banks which in turn used correspondent banks in larger cities to provide credit and liquidity. The National Bank of Commerce was the principal correspondent bank for bank clearings in the area southwest of Chicago and St. Louis. Because of this role, Commerce was at one point among the 20 largest banks in the United States, as measured by assets.

A casualty of the Panic of 1907, the National Bank of Commerce was placed into receivership by the Office of the Comptroller of the Currency on December 5, 1907, after a six-week series of runs on the bank. The bank paid out its depositors in full and after recapitalization was returned to its previous owners.

The National Bank of Commerce was later merged into the Commerce Trust Company, which became Commerce Bank of Kansas City, now part of Commerce Bancshares.
