= William Thornton Kemper Jr. =

American banker and philanthropist

William Thornton Kemper Jr. (July 24, 1902 – June 8, 1989) was an American banker, art patron, and philanthropist. A member of a prominent Kansas City banking and philanthropic family, Kemper was one of three sons of William Thorton Kemper Sr. and Charlotte Crosby Kemper.

== Education ==
Kemper Jr. attended the Kemper Military Academy in Booneville, Missouri.

After graduating from military school, Kemper Jr., attended the University of Missouri in Columbia, graduating with an art's bachelor 1926. While at university, Kemper was a member of the Phi Delta Theta fraternity, Scabbard and Blade, and Kappa Beta Phi.

== Fashion ==
Kemper Jr. was noted for his immaculate sense of dress, and was selected as one of the 20 best-dressed men in North America by the National Association of Merchant Tailors in 1939.

== Career ==
Kemper. Jr. grew up in the family business and went into banking. He held numerous executive positions at banks across the Midwest. A precocious professional, he was president of three banks by the age of 25, including First National Bank of Independence, Citizens National Bank of Frankfort, Kansas, and the Kemper State Bank of Booneville, MO. He served as the president of Missouri Bankers Association from 1938 to 1939.

Kemper served the arts and educational community as a board member for the Kansas City Art Institute for over 50 years, including a term as chairman.

== Legacy ==
Kemper Jr. was a notable patron of the arts, like his mother, who was a champion of the arts. Even though his family was prominent, Kemper, Jr.'s contributions, were often anonymous or quiet.

The William T. Kemper Foundation was established in 1989 after Kemper's death. The initial gift from the estate was more than $160,000,000. The Foundation focuses its giving on education, human services, civic improvement, and the arts, and it tends to target projects in Missouri, Kansas, and western Illinois. The foundation reflected Kemper, Jr.'s avid interest in fine arts and music.

Examples of his generosity can be found at the Nelson Atkins Museum of Art, many universities across the Midwest, The Muny and Children's Mercy in Kansas City, among other staple institutions in the foundation's footprint.
