= R. Crosby Kemper Jr. =

American banker (1927–2014)

- Kemper Jr. circa 2013
- Born: Rufus Crosby Kemper Jr. February 22, 1927; Kansas City, Missouri, U.S.
- Died: January 2, 2014 (aged 86); Indian Wells, California, U.S.
- Occupation: Retired banking magnate
- Years active: 50
- Employer: UMB Financial Corporation
- Spouse(s): Cynthia Warrick Kemper; Mary Kemper
- Children: 7, including Crosby III and Sandy
- Father: Rufus Crosby Kemper Sr.

Rufus Crosby Kemper Jr. (February 22, 1927 – January 2, 2014) was an American banker and philanthropist.

== Career ==
Kemper was born into an influential banking and railroading family in Kansas City, Missouri. His father was Rufus Crosby Kemper Sr. He attended Southwest High School in Kansas City, then transferred to Phillips Academy in Andover, Massachusetts, where he graduated in 1945. After returning from service in World War II, Kemper enrolled in the University of Missouri and became a member of the Zeta Phi chapter of Beta Theta Pi.

In 1950, Kemper went to work for the United Missouri Bank, which later became UMB Financial Corporation. He later became president in 1959. He ran for the U.S. Senate in 1962 on the Republican ticket and in the same year chaired the Kansas City Industrial Committee. He was active in the running of the Kemper Museum of Contemporary Art, which was named for him. He retired as chairman of UMB in 2004.

== Personal life ==
Kemper died at age 86 on January 2, 2014, at Indian Wells, California. He had seven children with wives Cynthia Warrick Kemper and Mary "Bebe" Stripp Kemper, including Crosby Kemper III and Mariner Kemper.

On June 18, 1965, Kemper and his wife Mary Kemper adopted son Sandy Kemper in Chicago Illinois. Kemper was a first cousin, twice removed, of actress Ellie Kemper.

Party political offices
Preceded by Herbert Douglas	Republican nominee for U.S. Senator from Missouri (Class 3); 1962	Succeeded by Thomas B. Curtis
