= Sandy Kemper =

American entrepreneur (born 1965)

- Born: June 18, 1965 (age 61); Chicago, Illinois, U.S.
- Education: Northwestern University (BA)
- Occupation: Entrepreneur
- Known for: Chairman and CEO UMB Financial Corporation, Chairman of Global Trading Web Association
- Spouse: Christine Kemper
- Children: 4
- Father: R. Crosby Kemper Jr.

Alexander Sandy Kemper (born June 18, 1965) is an American entrepreneur, known for being founder and board chairman of Agriculture Future of America, founder of Education, Inc., chairman of Global Trading Web Association, founder of The Collector’s Fund, and founder and CEO of Perfect Commerce, formerly known as eScout. Kemper is the chairman of the board and chief executive officer of C2FO.

== Early life and education ==
Kemper was born in Chicago in 1965 and raised in the Kansas City area by adoptive parents Mary “Bebe” Kemper and R. Crosby Kemper, Jr. who died in 2014.

== Career and later years ==
Kemper grew up in a family of bankers. While still in college, he started working with Continental Illinois Bank as an analyst in the treasury management division. Following graduation, he returned to Kansas City and, between 1995 and 2000, moved up through the ranks to become chairman and CEO of UMB Bank, founded in 1919 and run by a succession of family members, and CEO and President of UMB Financial Corporation.

The first company he founded, Education Inc., was a program that created a series of schools within public schools inside the Kansas City Public School district. Under his leadership, Education, Inc. grew to serve nearly 1,000 at-risk students in the Kansas City Missouri School District, giving them extended academic instruction, additional social services support, and mentors in the community to provide support and leadership.

Kemper has been recognized as a "Top banker in the US,” by American Banker, and in numerous local publications as a leader and entrepreneur in the business community. Featured in media outlets such as The Wall Street Journal, Bloomberg, CNN, CNBC National Public Radio and The Financial Times. Kemper has been widely recognized as a leader in B2B e-commerce and supply chain financial health.

Following his tenure at UMB Financial Corporation, he founded and served as the Chairman and CEO of Perfect Commerce (formerly eScout LLC), a provider of supplier relationship management technology. Under his leadership, Perfect Commerce created the Open Supplier Network (OSN) and became a provider of on-demand supplier relationship management (SRM) technology to businesses across the globe. Perfect Commerce expanded to become the world’s single largest independent supplier network, with over 500,000 suppliers. In 2001, he was named chairman of the Global Trading Web Association. Kemper retired as chairman and CEO of Perfect Commerce in 2006.

In 2006, Kemper co-founded The Collectors Fund (TCF). In addition to creating and managing The Kansas City Collection program, TCF also serves as the management company for the American Masters Collection and the Twentieth Century Masters Collection, two art ownership and investment funds for over 100 member families and businesses across the United States. The collections comprise works by many of the most recognized American artists of the 20th and 21st centuries. Their distinguished features include the art rotation program that allows members to enjoy museum-quality art in their homes, and unique educational events around the country.

In 2007, Kemper founded his next tech company, C2FO. It is a financial technology company and the creator of the first market for working capital. C2FO operates the C2FO working capital market for companies of all sizes around the world. C2FO has earned the attention and backing of venture firm Union Square Ventures, which is well known for investments in other fast-growing companies like Twitter and Zynga. C2FO is also backed by other venture capital firms including Peter Thiel's Mithril Capital Management, Temasek and Softbank.

In 2013, Kemper was invited by the U.S. Treasury to discuss innovative solutions to improve access to capital for American businesses in order to spur the country’s economic growth. U.S. Treasury Secretary Jacob J. Lew delivered opening remarks at the summit and Gene Sperling, National Economic Council Director, closed the event. They were joined by SBA Administrator Karen Mills and other thought leaders found throughout the business and finance communities. Kemper has also been a featured speaker at the World Bank.

In October 2015, C2FO reported its Q3 2015 working capital flows of $8.7BN, five times the rate compared to $1.7BN in Q3 2014. The market generated $1.1BN in volume in a single week. C2FO’s client base includes Amazon, Kellogg's, Macy's, Hanes, Walgreens, HP, Nordstrom, Sysco, ULTA Beauty, Pfizer, Toys R Us, Dannon, Costco and Mothercare, among others. C2FO was named to the first Forbes Fintech 50 List in 2015 and 2016.

In 2018, he was named to a national list of the top 100 most influential financial executives. The Business Journals' Influencers list spotlights 100 executives who are having an impact on business being done in communities nationwide.

== Boards and philanthropy ==
Kemper currently sits on the board of UMB Financial Corporation (NASDAQ: UMBF), Dwolla, and NIC (Nasdaq: EGOV) where he serves on the Audit committee and is Chairman of its Compensation committee. Kemper previously served on the boards of AXA Art Insurance (NYSE: AXA) and BATS and Cboe, two of the largest stock and options exchanges in the world. Kemper is a Trustee of the Enid and Crosby Kemper Charitable Trust, whose focus is primarily in giving to arts and education, a Trustee for the Kemper Museum of Art, and a Trustee for the Christine and Sandy Kemper Foundation, focused on entrepreneurship and education.

Kemper and his family are also engaged in a number of academic, civic and philanthropic endeavors. Kemper serves on the board of the Agriculture Future of America (AFA), a non-profit scholarship and leadership development organization, which he co-founded and has now grown to include more than 10,000 college scholars in active leadership development programs across the country. Kemper and his wife, Christine, have served as the Co-Chairmen for the World War I Museum's Call to Duty campaign, and have raised nearly $20 Million to enable construction of a new exhibition gallery at the Museum and renovation of existing outdoor space, as well as amenities to enhance the visitor experience as a venue for community and corporate events. In 2016, Sandy and Christine co-founded YEPKC (Young Entrepreneurs Program, Kansas City) along with four other C2FO employees. YEPKC allows juniors and seniors in high school to develop and practice entrepreneurial skills and explore their interests through hands-on professional experience by interning with fast-growth and start-up businesses in the Kansas City area. In 2017, the Henry W. Bloch School of Management named Sandy and Christine its Regional Entrepreneurs of the Year. In 2020, Sandy and Christine were recognized by Junior Achievement of Greater Kansas City as the newest members of its Business Hall of Fame.

== Personal life ==
Kemper lives with his wife Christine Kemper and their four children in Kansas City.

He is also the second-cousin, once-removed of actress Ellie Kemper.
