= Kemper Building (Chicago) =

Office skyscraper in Chicago, Illinois

Coordinates: 41.8864°N 87.6275°W

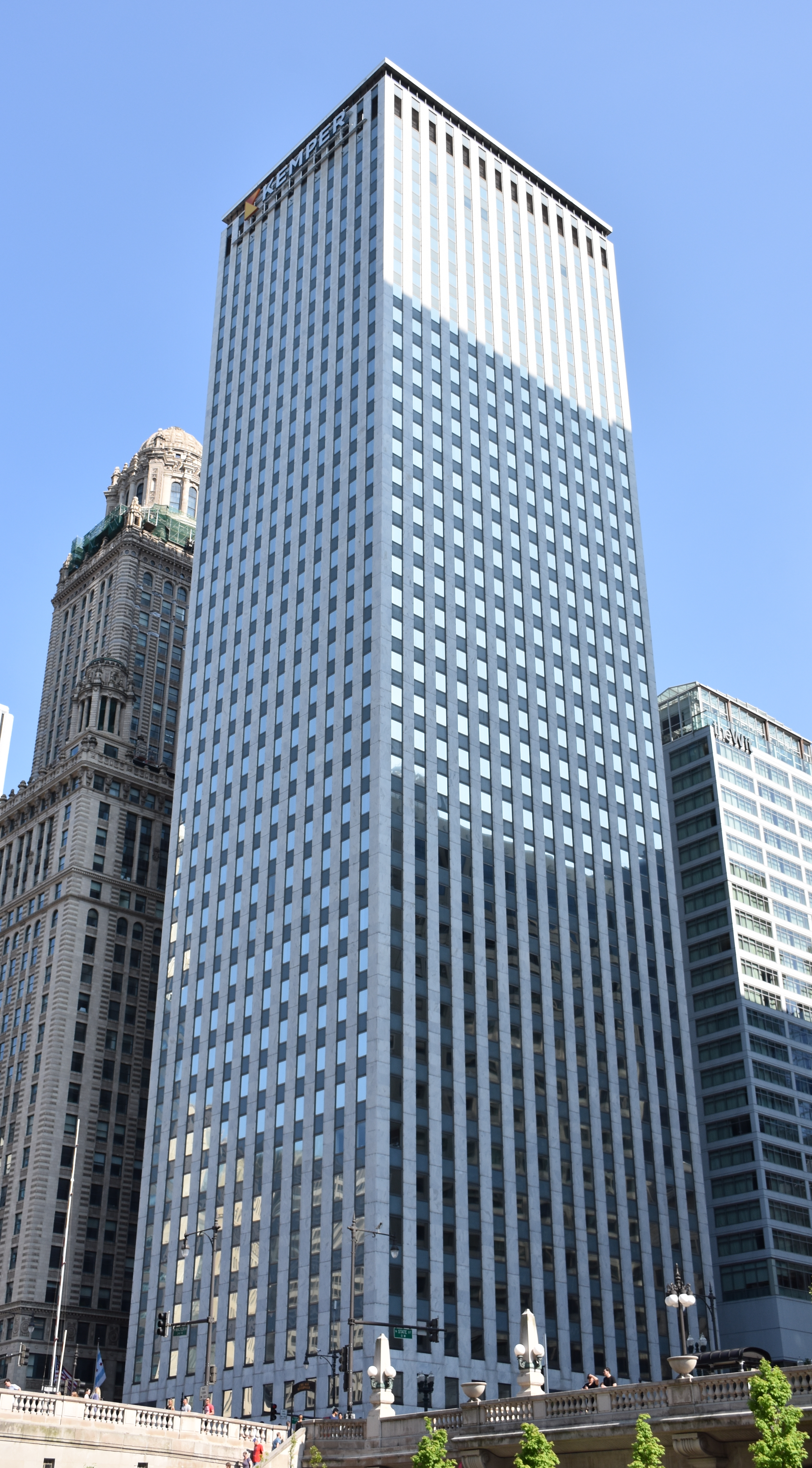
- (May 2016)
- Interactive map of the Kemper Building area

General information
- Status: Completed
- Type: Office
- Architectural style: Modernism
- Location: 1 East Wacker Drive, Chicago, Illinois
- Completed: 1962

Height
- Roof: 522 ft (159 m)

Technical details
- Floor count: 41

Design and construction
- Architects: Shaw, Metz and Associates

The Kemper Building is a 522 ft (159m) tall skyscraper in the Loop area of Downtown Chicago, Illinois. It was completed 1962 and has 41 floors. When it was completed, it was the tallest marble-clad office building in Chicago. In March 2018, the building's namesake tenant Kemper Corporation announced it was leaving the building for the nearby Aon Center.

== See also ==
- List of tallest buildings in Chicago
