= UMB Financial Corporation =

American financial services and banking company

- Type: Public
- Traded as: Nasdaq: UMBF; S&P 400 Component
- Industry: Banking
- Founded: 1913; 113 years ago
- Headquarters: Kansas City, Missouri, U.S.
- Key people: Mariner Kemper (chairman, president & CEO); Ram Shankar (CFO); Jim Rine (CEO of UMB Bank)
- Revenue: ▲US$1.468 billion (2022)
- Operating income: ▲US$433.020 million (2022)
- Net income: ▲US$431.682 million (2022)
- Total assets: ▲US$38.512 billion (2022)
- Total equity: ▲US$2.667 billion (2022)
- Number of employees: 3,804 (2022)
- Website: umb.com

UMB Financial Corporation is an American financial services company headquartered in Kansas City, Missouri. It offers comprehensive financial services, including deposit solutions like checking and savings accounts, credit services including home mortgages, auto loans, business loans and credit cards, as well as investing and wealth management. UMB serves individuals, companies and institutions across the U.S. and in Ireland.

UMB Financial is the parent company of UMB Bank, which ranks as one of America's Best Banks by Forbes and S&P Global Market Intelligence, based on eight financial measures of asset quality, capital adequacy and profitability. UMB operates banking and wealth management centers in Missouri, Arizona, California, Colorado, Illinois, Iowa, Kansas, Minnesota, Nebraska, New Mexico, Oklahoma, Texas, Utah, Wisconsin.

== History ==
In 1919, W.T. Kemper and Associates bought shares in City Center Bank, and R. Crosby Kemper became the president of the company. In 1926, the bank built a six-story headquarters, adding a drive-up service window in 1928. In 1934, the bank was renamed City National Bank and Trust Company and moved to Kansas City's financial center. In 1959, R. Crosby Kemper Jr. (a third generation banker from the Kemper family) became president of the bank and led the installation of its first computer processing system. City National acquired several other banks over the years as banking laws changed. In 1969, it reorganized as a holding company, Missouri Bancshares, which changed its name to United Missouri Bancshares (UMB) in 1971.

In 1987, UMB acquired FCB Corp. and its three banks in Southern Illinois. In 1992, UMB expanded into Colorado with the purchase of Valley Bank and National Bank of the West in Colorado Springs. UMB acquired Denver's Columbine National Bank in 1992, and in 1994, all of UMB's Colorado banks were merged into one entity, UMB Bank Colorado. To reflect its expansion outside of Missouri, UMB changed its name to the current UMB Financial Corporation in 1994. In 1995, UMB acquired Oklahoma Bank and its holding company, First Sooner Bancshares. That same year, UMB entered the online banking market in conjunction with Visa Interactive.

In 2001, UMB purchased Sunstone Financial Group Inc. and rebranded it to UMB Fund Services, Inc. It followed in 2002 with its purchase of State Street Bank & Trust Company of Missouri. In 2001 UMB also established Scout Investment Advisors Inc.

In February 2002, the UMB acquired naming rights to St. Louis' Riverport Amphitheatre and renamed it UMB Bank Pavilion. This agreement expired in 2006, after which Verizon Wireless purchased naming rights. In 2004, Peter deSilva became the president and Mariner Kemper became chairman and CEO of UMB Financial Corporation.

In June 2015, UMB acquired Marquette Financial Companies, which expanded its operations into the U.S states of Minnesota, Texas and Arizona.

In April 2017, the firm sold Reams Asset Management and Scouts Investments to Raymond James Financial for $172.5 million.

In December 2019, UMB had 91 branches located across eight U.S. states: Missouri, Illinois, Colorado, Kansas, Oklahoma, Nebraska, Arizona and Texas.

UMB acquired Heartland Financial in 2025, bringing it into five more states, including California, Minnesota, New Mexico, Iowa and Wisconsin (which used state and regional-focused brands for their ten banking divisions, all of which have taken the new UMB Bank name), and merged banking and marketing operations in full by the end of the year, with physical signage replaced with UMB branding in mid-October.

As of January 2026, UMB has 211 domestic locations in 14 states: Arizona, California, Colorado, Illinois, Iowa, Kansas, Minnesota, Missouri, Nebraska, New Mexico, Oklahoma, Texas, Utah, Wisconsin.

== Lines of business ==
- Accounts Receivable Financing
- Commercial Banking and Lending
- Healthcare Services: Health Savings Accounts (HSA) and Flexible Spending Accounts (FSA)
- Institutional Banking and Lending
- Personal Banking: Private Wealth Management and Consumer Banking
- Small Business Banking
- Transportation Finance

== Subsidiaries ==
Subsidiaries of the holding company and the lead bank, UMB Bank, n.a., include mutual fund and alternative investment services groups, single-purpose companies that deal with brokerage services and insurance, and a registered investment adviser that manages the company's proprietary mutual funds and investment advisory accounts for institutional customers.

- UMB Bank, National Association
- UMB Bank & Trust, National Association
- Heartland Financial USA, Inc.
- UMB Distribution Services, LLC
- UMB Financial Services, Inc.
- Marquette Asset Management, LLC
- Prairie Capital Management, LLC
- United Missouri Insurance Company
