= Main Street (Kansas City, Missouri) =

Major street in Kansas City, Missouri

- Interactive map of Main Street
- Length: 9.8 mi (15.8 km); Combined length
- Coordinates: 39°1′54.93″N 94°35′12.89″W
- North: 6th Street
- South: 97th Street

Main Street or Main is one of the major streets in Kansas City, Missouri and the Kansas City metropolitan area. Main Street serves as the main administrative dividing line for house numbering and east–west streets in Kansas City; for example, it separates East 59th Street from West 59th Street. Address numbers on east–west streets increase in both directions as one moves away from Main Street. This should not be confused with the Kansas City "East Side" and "West Side," a cultural distinction which has arisen from a history of racist segregation in the city, separated by Troost Avenue approximately 1 mile east of Main Street.

The main portion of Main Street is 4.6 miles (7.4 km) long, traveling south from 6th Street in Downtown Kansas City to 47th Street / Emanuel Cleaver II Boulevard at the Country Club Plaza. This section of Main Street is predominantly commercial and mixed-use, connecting the Financial District, Kansas City Power & Light District, and Crossroads downtown with Union Hill, Westport, and the Plaza Area in midtown. It continues north as Delaware Street into the Kansas City River Market at its northern terminus and as Brookside Boulevard into Brookside at its southern terminus.

Main Street continues south of the Plaza for 4.5 miles (7.2 km), mostly through residential neighborhoods, from 1.3 miles (2.1 km) from Ward Parkway to 85th Street. It is noncontinuous at 59th Street, 1.3 miles (2.1 km) south of Ward Parkway, where it is interrupted by Brookside Boulevard. These portions service the South Plaza, Brookside, Armour Hills, and Waldo neighborhoods.

Two noncontinuous minor stubs are also designated as Main Street. From north to south, they run:

- 0.6 miles (0.97 km) from 89th Street to 94th Street.
- 0.1 miles (0.16 km) from 96th Street to 97th Street.

A final 300 feet (91 m) section of Main Street also exists between 164th Terrace and 165th Street in the suburb of Belton, Missouri, though it is not considered part of Main Street in local lexicon.

== Transit ==
- The Kansas City Area Transportation Authority (KCATA) operates many bus routes along Main Street.
- The KCATA's Metro Area Express ("MAX") "Orange Line," services Main Street from Warwick Trafficway (29th Street) to Emanuel Cleaver II Boulevard.
- The KC Streetcar opened for service on May 6, 2016 and travels 2.2 miles (3.5 km) in Downtown along Main Street between the River Market and Union Station. Efforts are under way to extend an additional 3.8 miles (6.1 km) to University of Missouri-Kansas City (UMKC) south of the Country Club Plaza.

== Points of interest ==
- Commerce Tower, located at 909 Main.
- AMC Theatres former headquarters, located at 920 Main.
- 10th & Main Transit Plaza, located at 10th Street and Main Street.
- City Center Square, located at 1100 Main.
- Town Pavilion, located at 1111 Main.
- One Kansas City Place, located at 1200 Main.
- The Midland Theatre, located at 1228 Main.
- The Power & Light District, located east of Main Street between 12th Street and Truman Road / I-670.
- H&R Block headquarters, located at 13th Street and Main Street.
- The Mainstreet Theater, located at 1400 Main.
- The former TWA Corporate Headquarters Building, located at 1740 Main Street.
- The Crossroads, extending along Main Street from roughly 17th Street to 20th Street.
- Union Station, located at 30 W Pershing Road on Main Street.
- The Liberty Memorial and National World War I Museum and Memorial, located west of Main Street in Penn Valley Park between Pershing Road and 27th Street.
- The Federal Reserve Bank of Kansas City, located at Grand Boulevard and Main Street.
- The historic Union Hill neighborhood, located east of Main Street between 27th Street and 31st Street.
- The former Interstate Bakeries Corporation world headquarters, located at 12 E Armour Boulevard on Main Street.
- The Unicorn Theatre, located at 3828 Main Street.
- St. Paul's Episcopal Day School, located at 4041 Main Street.
- American Century Investments, headquartered at 4500 Main Street.
- The northeasternmost point of the Country Club Plaza, located at Main Street and Emanuel Cleaver II Boulevard / 47th Street.
- Brush Creek, passing under Main Street as it becomes Brookside Boulevard. south of Ward Parkway.
- The Plaza Library, located at 4801 Main Street.
- Brookside, one of J.C. Nichols's planned Country Club District neighborhoods, located along Main Street between 55th Street and Gregory Boulevard (71st Street).
- St. Teresa's Academy, located at 5600 Main Street.
- The Brookside Shopping District, located west of Main Street between 62nd Terrace and Meyer Boulevard.
- Armour Hills, a portion of Brookside and part of J.C. Nichols's planned Country Club District neighborhoods, located along Main Street between 65th Street and Gregory Boulevard (71st Street).
