= Kaw Township, Jackson County, Missouri =

Kaw Township
- Township
- Interactive map of Kaw Township
- Coordinates: 38°51′21″N 94°33′36″W
- State: Missouri
- County: Jackson
- Established: 1827

Area
  - Total: 35.17 sq mi (91.08 km^{2})
  - Land: 34.86 sq mi (90.28 km^{2})
  - Water: 0.31 sq mi (0.8 km^{2}) 0.88%

Population (2000)
  - Total: 182,719
  - Density: 21,834.7/sq mi (8,430.41/km^{2})
- Time zone: UTC-6 (CST)
  - Summer (DST): UTC-5 (CDT)
- GNIS Feature ID: 766802

Kaw Township is one of eight townships in Jackson County, Missouri, United States. The township is within the city of Kansas City. As of 2010 census, its population was 182,719. The township was established in 1827 through an order of the county court.

== History ==
Kaw Township was founded in 1827, taking its name from the Kaw River.

== Geography ==
Kaw Township covers an area of 35.17 square miles (91.08 km^{2}) and is within the city of Kansas City. It borders the Missouri River to the north, the state of Kansas to the west, Cass County to the south, and the rest of Kansas City to the east. The Kaw Township is within the Kansas City urban area.

=== City Market ===
The City Market is within the Kaw Township. Since its inception in 1857, the City Market has been one of the largest and most enduring public farmers' markets in the midwest, linking growers and small businesses to the Kansas City community. In addition, more than 30 full-time merchants are open year-round and offer specialty foods, fresh meats and seafood, restaurants and cafes, floral, home accessories and much more.

=== Downtown ===
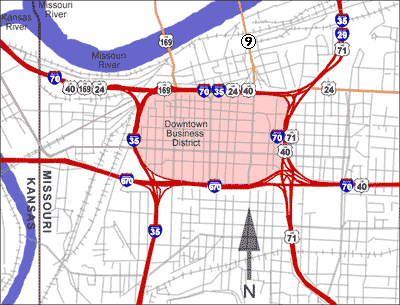
The city's tallest buildings and characteristic skyline are roughly contained inside the downtown freeway loop (shaded in red). Downtown Kansas City itself is established by city ordinance to stretch from the Missouri River south to 31st Street (beyond the bottom of this map), and from State Line Rd. to Troost Ave.

A look down Downtown Kansas City streets today.

Downtown Kansas City is an area of 2.9 square miles (7.5 km^{2}) bounded by the Missouri River to the north, 31st Street to the south, Troost Avenue to the East, and State Line road to the West. Areas near Downtown Kansas City include the 39th Street District is known as Restaurant Row and features one of Kansas City's largest selections of independently owned restaurants and boutique shops. It is a center of literary and visual arts and bohemian culture. Crown Center is the headquarters of Hallmark Cards and a major downtown shopping and entertainment complex. It is connected to Union Station by a series of covered walkways. The Country Club Plaza, or simply "the Plaza", is an upscale, outdoor shopping and entertainment district. It was the first suburban shopping district in the United States, designed to accommodate shoppers arriving by automobile, and is surrounded by apartments and condominiums, including a number of high rise buildings. The associated Country Club District to the south includes the Sunset Hill and Brookside neighborhoods, and is traversed by Ward Parkway, a landscaped boulevard known for its statuary, fountains and large, historic homes. Kansas City's Union Station is home to Science City, restaurants, shopping, theaters, and the city's Amtrak facility.

== Federal representation ==
- Missouri's 5th congressional district – all of Kansas City proper in Jackson County plus Independence and portions of Cass County. Currently represented by Emanuel Cleaver (Democrat)

The United States Postal Service operates post offices in Kansas City. The Kansas City Main Post Office is located at 300 West Pershing Road.

== Transportation ==
The Kaw Township is serviced by six interstate highways and six U.S. highways. The Kansas City Area Transportation Authority (KCATA) was formed with the signing of a Bi-State compact created by the Missouri and Kansas legislatures on December 28, 1965. The compact gives the KCATA responsibility for planning, construction, owning, and operating passenger transportation systems and facilities within the seven-county Kansas City metropolitan area.

On December 12, 2012, downtown Kansas City voters approved construction of a $102 million, 2-mile modern streetcar that will be operational by 2015. The line will run between River Market and Union Station, mostly on Main Street. A new non-profit corporation made up of private sector stakeholders and city appointees—the Kansas City Streetcar Authority—will operate and maintain the system. There will be no fare charged initially, unlike many similar US systems. The city is planning to add multiple extensions to the starter line.

== See also ==
- Kansas City, Missouri
- Downtown Kansas City
