= Heartland Light Rail System (Kansas City, Missouri) =

Overview
- Locale: Kansas City Metropolitan Area

Service
- Type: Light rail
- Operator(s): Kansas City Area Transportation Authority

Technical
- Line length: 12–14-mile (19–23 km)
- Track gauge: 1,435 mm (4 ft 8 1/2 in)
- Minimum radius: (?)

The Heartland Light Rail System was a proposed light rail system for Kansas City, Missouri. It was defeated by voters in November 2008, there are some planning in the Kansas City Smart Moves Plan.

== Proposed route ==
The line would have run on a north and south route from Vivion Road and North Oak Trafficway to Bruce R. Watkins Roadway and 63rd Street. This route would have crossed into Jackson County, Clay County, and over the Missouri River.

== See also ==
- KC Streetcar
