= Kansas City Bus Station =

Intercity bus station in Kansas City, Missouri

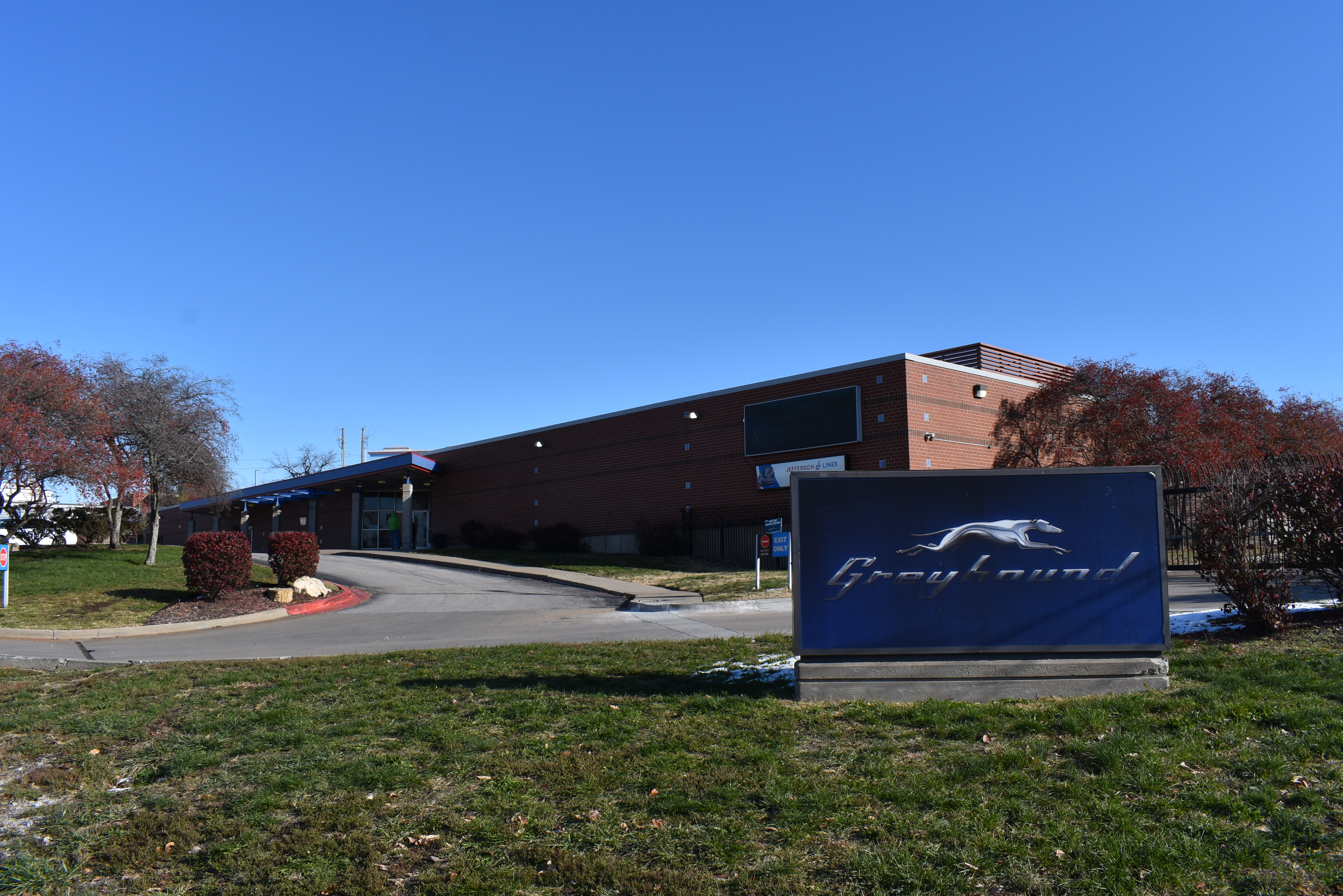
- The Kansas City Bus Station in November 2023

General information
- Location: 1101 Troost Avenue, Kansas City, Missouri
- Coordinates: 39.100040°N 94.569411°W
- Owner: Twenty Lake Holdings
- Operator: Greyhound Lines
- Bus stands: 9
- Bus operators: Greyhound Lines; Jefferson Lines
- Connections: RideKC 9, 11, 12, 18, 25, 71, PMAX

Construction
- Architect: Howard Needles Tammen & Bergendoff

Other information
- Website: Official website

History
- Opened: June 3, 1989
Location

The Kansas City Bus Station is an intercity bus station in the Paseo West neighborhood of Kansas City, Missouri. The station, managed by Greyhound Lines, also serves Jefferson Lines. The current building was constructed in 1989.

Kansas City has seen intercity bus transit since at least 1929, when a union bus terminal opened on McGee Street. In 1967, a Greyhound Lines bus terminal opened on Holmes Street, which would be in operation until 1989. This was replaced by the current bus station on Troost Avenue, which opened June 3, 1989.

== Attributes ==
The Greyhound station building sits in the Paseo West neighborhood, taking up one city block. The terminal is bordered by Troost and Forest avenues to the west and east, and 11th and 12th streets to the north and south. The main entrance is located on Troost Avenue. The bus station is managed by Greyhound Lines, but also serves Jefferson Lines.

== History ==
=== Early stations ===
The first intercity bus station in Kansas City was the Union Bus Terminal, which opened in 1929 at 917 McGee Street. On March 19, 1967, a new Greyhound bus terminal opened at 1111 Holmes Street. The new terminal was designed by Kivett & Myers for $3 million, and included a 300 space parking facility, 12 bus bays, a cafeteria, cocktail lounge and games area. It was expected to serve 70 daily departures and 70 arrivals per day. Upon opening, the facility served Central Greyhound, Crown Coach Company, Finley-Shotwell Bus Lines, Jefferson Transportation Company, Kansas City-Leavenworth Bus Lines, and Southern Kansas Greyhound Lines. However, Trailways buses continued to use the Union Bus Terminal on McGee Street. By the late 1980s however, the station was beginning to show its age, and the building's owners began negotiating a lease to redevelop the site as a sporting good store.

=== Current station ===
Greyhound began running service from 1023 McGee Street in early 1989, while construction was underway on the new terminal. The new terminal opened on June 3, 1989, after delays pushed back the original March opening date. The $2.9 million facility was designed by Howard Needles Tammen & Bergendoff. The 13,300 square foot facility included nine bus bays, an on-site maintenance facility, and seating for 144 passengers.

In 2021, Greyhound was sold to FlixMobility, the owner of Flixbus. However, this did not include any bus stations. So in 2022, the station, along with 32 other Greyhound stations across the country, was sold to Twenty Lake Holdings for $140 million. As of 2023, the Kansas City station is considered at risk of closing, similar to the closure and sale of bus stations in Cincinnati, Knoxville and elsewhere.

== See also ==
- Kansas City Union Station
- List of intercity bus stops in Missouri
