= Annie Chambers =

American brothel owner (1843–1935)

- Born: Leannah Loveall; June 6, 1843; Sullivan, Kentucky, U.S.
- Died: March 24, 1935 (aged 91); Kansas City, Missouri, U.S.
- Occupations: Brothel madam; boarding house owner
- Years active: c. 1872–1923
- Children: 2

Annie Chambers (June 6, 1843 - March 24, 1935), born Leannah Loveall, was an American brothel owner, boarding house owner, and former prostitute. She started her brothel around 1872 at the River Market, Kansas City, Kansas City's former red-light district.

== Early life ==
Annie Chambers was born under the name Leannah Loveall on June 6, 1843, in Sullivan, Kentucky. Her father ran a hotel and was a Confederate sympathizer. As a young girl, she was asked to Lexington ride in an 1860 parade for Abraham Lincoln but when she did, her father disowned her. Being forced out of the house, she moved in with an aunt and uncle.

She became a teacher and married William Chambers and had a son who died at one year old. After a buggy accident, Chambers was left in a coma, pregnant with her second child. She awoke to discover her husband had died, and her child was stillborn.

After the death of her husband and child, she moved to Indianapolis and found a job as a sex worker, taking the name Annie Chambers. She later declared she made the decision to live a "short but a fast and merry" life. The Indianapolis police frequently raided her place of work. When she discovered that a client she became engaged to was already married, she decided to move to Kansas City.

She came to Kansas City in 1869, when she was twenty-six years old, and only three years later purchased a large mansion that she turned into a brothel. Her career in sex work was so successful that she became known as "Queen of the Red-Light District."

== Career ==
Annie Chambers' sex work career lasted from the 1870s to the 1930s. Many considered her to be notorious, including reformers, police officers, judges, citizens, and newspaper writers.

Annie Chambers arrived in Kansas City in 1869, right after the opening of the Hannibal Bridge. The Bridge was the first railroad crossing over the Missouri River, connecting areas West of the river to Eastern markets like Chicago and New York. The crossing made Kansas City an important rail hub, especially key for the cattle industry. The boom brought new migrants, mostly young men. At the time, more unmarried men lived in the city than unmarried women, frequenting the city's 80 saloons and 40 brothels.

Chambers opened her first house of prostitution north of the Missouri River. Two years later, she used the money earned there to open a larger business in the City Market neighborhood, now called the River Market, on the Southwest corner of 3rd and Wyandotte St. The two-story mansion had 25 rooms, chandeliers, a dining room, a ballroom, and a wine room. Marble floors were inlaid with her surname and velvet curtains were in every room. A custom-made gilded mirror lined with blue bulbs cost her $5000, an extravagant sum in the late 1800s. In the main parlor hung a large portrait that was allegedly of a young Annie Chambers. She referred to the mansion as a "resort" "devoted to fun and humor," and marketed it as a high-end option. The institution was more expensive compared to other similar businesses, charging $10 in comparison to other local prostitutes that would charge as little as 25 cents. Her employees kept half the fee while she got the other half.

At the time, the City Market neighborhood was the center of Kansas City, housing City Hall and Police Headquarters. Chambers maintained the business through bribes and fines, ensuring minimal police interference. Employing a wide variety of workers, Chambers crafted a carefully decorated brothel and forged healthy relationships with the local authorities so she could run her business with impunity. During this period, she also married and divorced William Kearns, becoming Leannah Kearns.

However, in 1913 the Kansas City Anti-Vice Society increased attacks on the sex industry, calling to outlaw the practice. The police proposed segregating the industry, separating it from residential and business areas. This pressure prompted Chambers to changed her practices; instead of openly soliciting business from her front step, she began to advertise her brothel as a rooming house, and only those who knew the establishment's real purpose could enter. She also installed a heavy iron chain across the front door of her brothel and only admitted new clients if they arrived with regular customers in an attempt to avoid police raids.

After her brothel was shut down in 1921 by prosecutor Cameron Orr as a result of a new Missouri law declaring institutions that were used for lewd and immoral purposes to be a nuisance, Annie Chambers turned to running a boarding house. Her notoriety attracted many patrons, which created events where the elite members of Kansas City came to eat dinner and listen to stories of the city's wide open days.

== Arrest ==
In 1921, Annie Chambers was arrested by prosecutor Cameron Orr, along with all of her employees. Orr's action was made possible by a new law that had been passed earlier that year by the Missouri legislature which provided that any "building being used for lewd and immoral purposes could be declared a nuisance."

Judge Thomas P. Buckner came to Chambers' aid, holding court at his house on a Friday evening at 11pm. Though Buckner was able to release the prisoners on bond, the police refused to take the bond money because it would undermine the new law. In response to this lack of cooperation from Judge Buckner, Cameron Orr filed the injunction suit in Judge Allen Southern's division, who ordered that Chambers' brothel be closed by December 1921. She managed to reopen the brothel in 1923, but converted it into a boarding house the same year.

== Conversion to Christianity ==
In the 1930s, when Annie Chambers was an elderly women, nearly blind and crippled from arthritis, she happened to hear a sermon from her window given by Reverend Bulkley from the window of her mansion that used to serve as a brothel. The minister was performing a funeral for the baby of a sex worker who lived in the remains of Chambers' brothel. Allegedly, the sermon was the first she had heard since she was a girl. She claimed it moved her to tears, having similarly lost two babies as a young wife.

Reverend Bulkley and his wife Beulah had purchased a former brothel that stood between two other former brothels, one owned by Chambers and the other owned by Eva Prince.

One day after the baby's funeral, Mrs. Bulkley and Annie Chambers met one another on the sidewalk outside their homes. Chambers told the minister's wife how the funeral sermon had moved her and how she wanted to become friends with the Bulkleys. This led to many visits from the Bulkleys, who gave Chambers a Bible, prayed with her, and brought her dinner. Chambers eventually made the decision to donate her home to the Bulkley's mission, because she believed that it would make 'a good place for a refuge or home for girls who needed love and sympathy.' She also converted to Christianity as a result of the Bulkley's involvement in her life, and the couple cared for her until she passed away.

After her death, the Bulkleys expanded their Salvation Army City Union Mission into Chamber's mansion.

== Death ==
Annie Chambers died on March 24, 1935 in her "vermillion bedroom on her made-to-order brass bed." Her obituary is as follows:

"The death was peaceful and a welcome one for Annie Chambers. Two weeks ago when she became ill, the 92‐year‐old woman expressed only the desire to go to sleep. Her life had been tranquil and happy since she found religion in February, 1934. With her last moments, as all through her illness, were the Rev. David Bulkley and Mrs. Bulkley. It was through Mr. Bulkley that Annie Chambers found the solace of trust in God."

Her funeral was attended by many people that had been touched by or involved in her life; sex workers, reformers, government officials, and businessmen. Per her request, she was buried under a tombstone engraved only with her legal birth name, Leannah Kearnes.

Her gravesite is part of the walking tour for Elmwood Cemetery, and the original tombstone has been replaced with one that included both her legal name and her invented, more infamous name of Annie Chambers, along with an inscription that reads, "Redeemed Late in life, Annie gave her property to the City Union Mission." Although she desired for her involvement in the Kansas City sex industry to be erased, the amount of information preserved about that part of her life is extensive and open to the public.

In 1946, her mansion was torn down.
