= Johnson County Transit =

Public transit operator in Kansas

Johnson County Transit – The JO

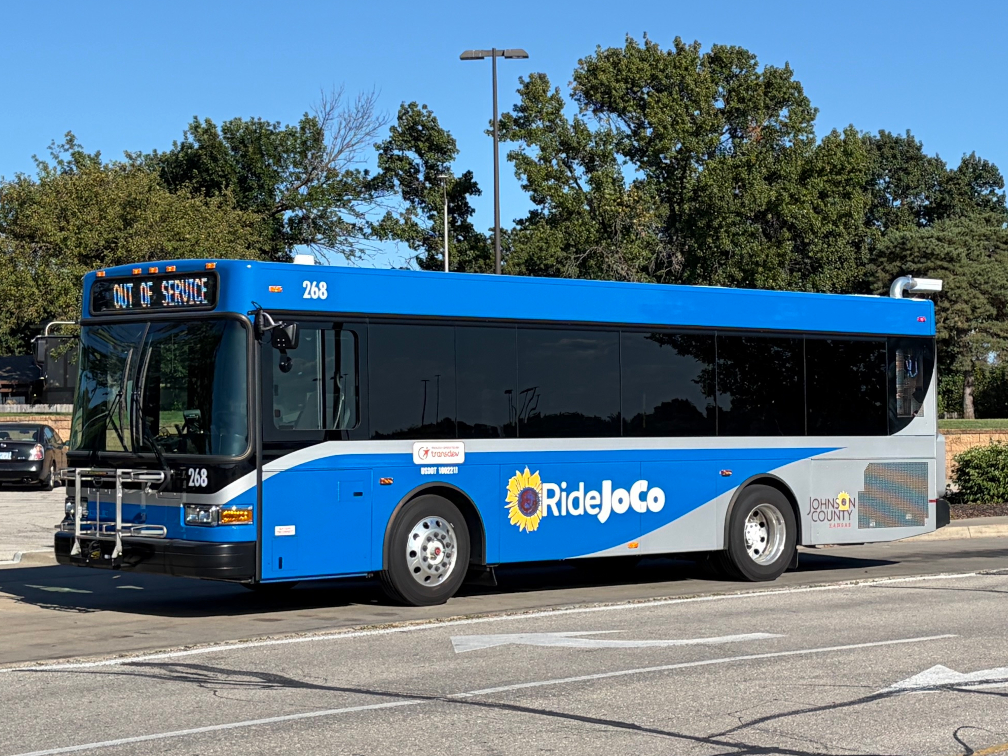
- A Johnson County Transit bus sporting the current Ride JoCo livery.
- Founded: 1982
- Headquarters: Olathe, Kansas
- Locale: Johnson County, Kansas, Kansas City Metropolitan Area
- Service type: Transit bus, Intercity bus
- Routes: 9
- Fleet: 83
- Daily ridership: 1,900 (weekdays, Q1 2026)
- Annual ridership: 483,400 (2025)
- Operator: First Transit

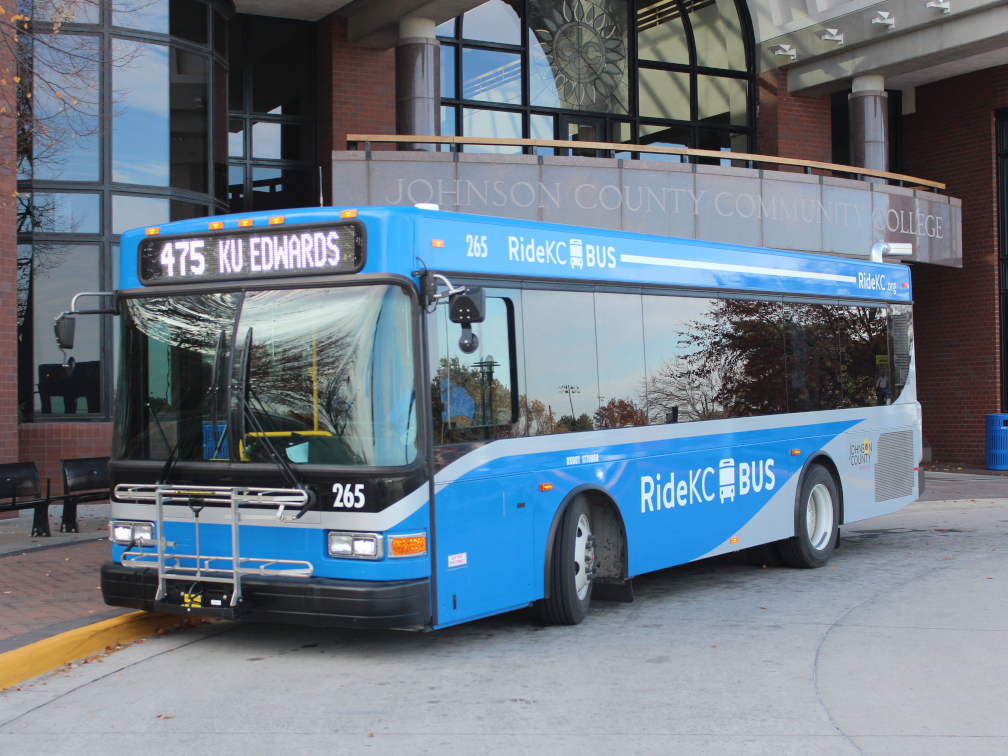
Johnson County Transit #265 at JCCC.

Johnson County Transit is a public transit operator in Johnson County, Kansas. The agency operates 11 transit bus routes primarily in Johnson County, with service to Kansas City, Missouri as well as Wyandotte and Douglas counties in Kansas.

Johnson County Transit started operations in 1982 as Commuteride and began operating as The JO in 1986. The JO took over service from the Kansas City Area Transportation Authority, which provided service in Johnson County until 1981.

In November of 2014, The JO was re-branded into "RideKC" – a branding effort designed to unify all Kansas City metro area transit providers under a single fare and route structure. However, Johnson County commissioners voted in April 2022 to withdraw from the KCATA in favor of creating its own transit division, which went into effect on August 1, 2022. The county commissioners adopted the Johnson County Transit Strategic Plan in November 2025, which involved prioritizing fixed-route service in high-demand areas, restructuring the micro transit service that was launched in 2019, and rebranding the system as Ride JoCo.

In 2025, the system had a ridership of 483,400, or about 1,900 per weekday as of the first quarter of 2026.

== Regular Routes ==
Johnson County Transit uses route numbers integrated with those used by the KC Metro bus system. The 400-series routes are Johnson County local routes, and the 500-series routes are express routes. Fixed-route fares are $2 for a single ride on most routes; the 510 K-10 Connector fare is $4 for a one-way trip. The current Johnson County Transit routes are shown below.

=== List of routes ===
- 401-495: Local routes
- 510-520: Express routes
- Green indicates full-day 30 minute frequencies
- Blue indicates full-day 60 minute frequencies
- Red indicates commuter service

Route #	Route Name	Terminal 1	Terminal 2	Notes
401	Metcalf-Plaza	Overland Park; Johnson County Community College	Kansas City; University of Missouri–Kansas City	
402	Johnson-Quivira	Overland Park; Oak Park Mall	Kansas City, Kansas; Minnesota & 18th	Limited extended service to Renner & 116th (3 departures per day) and Mur Len & 127th (1 departure per day).
403	Antioch-KU Med	Olathe; K-7 & Santa Fe	Kansas City, Kansas; University of Kansas Medical Center	
404	Metcalf-Downtown	Overland Park; 119th & Metcalf Park & Ride	Kansas City; 12th & Pennsylvania	Travels on I-35 for a portion of the route
475	Quivira-75th Street	Overland Park; University of Kansas Edwards Campus	Kansas City; 75th & Troost Transit Center	
487	87th Street-MTC	Lenexa; 87th & Scarborough (Lenexa City Center)	Mission; Mission Transit Center	
495	95th Street	Lenexa; 87th & Scarborough (Lenexa City Center)	Kansas City; 74th & Broadway Park & Ride	
510	K-10 Connector	Overland Park; University of Kansas Edwards Campus	Lawrence; Bob Billings & Crestline (Central Station)	One intermediate stop at Johnson County Community College. Runs a limited schedule during school breaks at the University of Kansas. Travels on I-435 and K-10.
520	Strang Line Express	Olathe; Strang Line Rd Park & Ride	Kansas City; 12th & Pennsylvania	One intermediate stop before downtown Kansas City at Oak Park Mall. Travels on I-35.

== Other Services ==
In addition to The JO, Johnson County Transit also operates three other services; Local Links, The JO-Special Edition, & SWIFT.

=== Local Links ===
Local Links are either deviated-fixed routes or demand-response routes, with designated, geographic service areas. Many of the Local Links are a partnership between Johnson County Transit, the city or cities being served. The Local Links routes are:

812 JOFlex – A deviated-fixed route operating Tuesday & Friday, mostly in north-central Overland Park, Kansas. The fare is $1.00 per trip.

=== The JO-Special Edition ===
The JO-Special Edition, a shared ride program administered by Johnson County Transit, provides affordable curb-to-curb transportation for residents of Johnson County who are sixty (60) years of age or older, or have a documented disability or are within established low-income guidelines.

Eligible riders may use The JO-Special Edition for any trip purpose within the Johnson County service area. Children ages 13 to 18 with a documented disability may ride for medical appointments only. The JO – Special Edition travels into specified areas of Kansas City, Kansas and Kansas City, Missouri for medical trips only.

Special Edition operates curb-to-curb service Monday-Friday and is provided on a first come, first served basis. Fares are based upon distance traveled and multiple ride passes are available.

=== SWIFT ===
SWIFT (Sheltered Workshop Industrial Fixed Transit) provides Monday-Friday, curb-to-curb transportation for developmentally disabled individuals working at the Johnson County Developmental Supports facility in Lenexa, Kansas.

== Partner Agencies ==
- Kansas City Area Transportation Authority
- Lawrence Transit-The T official site
- KU on Wheels official site
- KU Parking & Transit official site
- The Bus official site
- Mid-America Regional Council official site
