= George Sheidley =

American businessman

George Sheidley (c. 1833-1896) was an American property developer, cattle trader and philanthropist who was one of the most prominent businessmen of his era in Kansas City, Kansas. His charitable donations at the end of his life resulted in a lawsuit between his family and the charity.

== Early life ==
Sheidy was born in Marietta, Pennsylvania in about 1833. In 1841, the family moved to Republic, Ohio. As a young man, Sheidy, worked in carriage manufacturing. In 1871, Sheidy and his three brothers started a sheep business in South Texas, but it later evolved into a successful livestock business.

In 1876, after their mother's death, the brothers relocated their company, the Sheidley Cattle Company, to Kansas City. Sheidy started investing extensively in Kansas City real estate. He held stock in the Kansas City Cable Company, and was part owner of an original Kansas City Streetcar. Scheidy also developed several commercial properties in the city.

== Later life ==
Sheidy suffered strokes in 1890 and 1894 that totally disabled him. In March 1894, however, he pledged $25,000 to the Kansas City Public Library for purchasing books and sent them the first payment of $5,000. In October 1894, his family successfully petitioned a local court to have Sheidy declared insane. His sister Sarah became his legal guardian.

After Sarah Sheidy became legal guardian, she refused to pay the Library. At the end of 1894, the board of education sued her. The board won the case, primarily because Sheidley had established a reputation for generosity during his lifetime; the court ruled that giving to the public library was something that he would have done in sound mind.

Sheidley died of a stroke in 1896.
