= Kaw Township =

Kaw Township may refer to the following townships in the United States:

- Kaw Township, Jefferson County, Kansas
- Kaw Township, Wabaunsee County, Kansas
- Kaw Township, Jackson County, Missouri
