= RideKC =

Public transportation system for metro Kansas City

- Product type: Public transportation
- Country: United States
- Introduced: 2014
- Markets: Kansas City metropolitan area
- Website: ridekc.org

RideKC is the brand for public transportation systems in the Kansas City metropolitan area.

The RideKC brand was adopted in August 2014 by the Kansas City Streetcar Authority, operators of the KC Streetcar line then under construction in Kansas City, Missouri. The Kansas City Area Transportation Authority adopted RideKC in November, followed by Johnson County Transit, IndeBus and Unified Government Transit.

Buses using the RideKC livery rolled out in Kansas City and Johnson County in October 2015. UG Transit transitioned in 2016, with IndeBus co-branding for the time being.

As part of the consolidation, a regionwide local fare for buses took effect in January 2016.

The RideKC website launched in October 2015 consolidating schedules, maps and other information for all participating transit agencies.

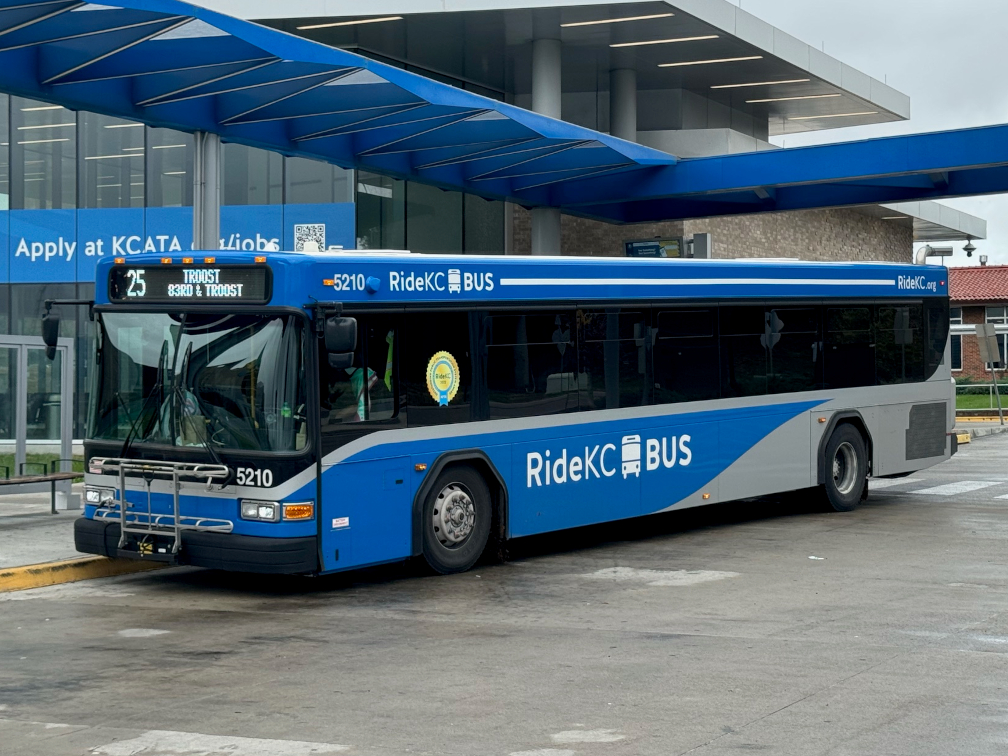
A Kansas City Area Transportation Authority bus in the RideKC Bus livery.

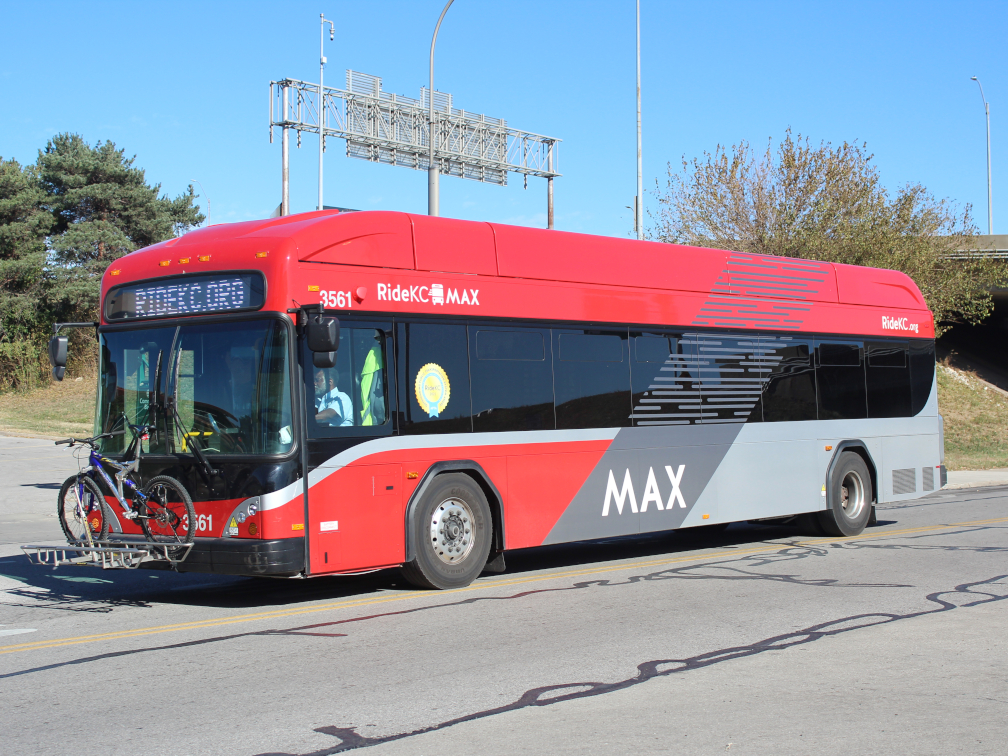
A Kansas City Area Transportation Authority bus in the RideKC MAX livery.

== Services ==
=== Transit providers ===
- IndeBus (Independence, MO) - fixed route 'RideKC Bus' and ADA complementary paratransit 'RideKC Freedom'
- Johnson County Transit (Johnson County, KS) - fixed route 'RideKC Bus' and demand responsive 'RideKC Micro Transit'
- KC Streetcar (Kansas City, MO) - fixed route 'RideKC Streetcar'
- Kansas City Area Transportation Authority - fixed route 'RideKC Bus', demand responsive 'RideKC Flex', ADA complementary paratransit 'RideKC Freedom', and non-ADA paratransit 'RideKC Freedom On-Demand'
  - Metro Area Express (bus rapid transit) - fixed route 'RideKC MAX'
- Unified Government Transit (Wyandotte County, KS) - fixed route 'RideKC Bus', demand responsive 'RideKC Micro Transit', and ADA complementary paratransit 'RideKC Freedom'

=== Partnering agencies ===
- RideKC Bike (bike share) - fleet operated by BikeWalkKC
- Bridj (microtransit) - demand responsive 'RideKC Bridj' pilot ended in 2016
- Mid-America Regional Council - 'RideshareKC' carpool program
