= Brookside Shopping District =

Coordinates: 39.014082°N 94.591384°W

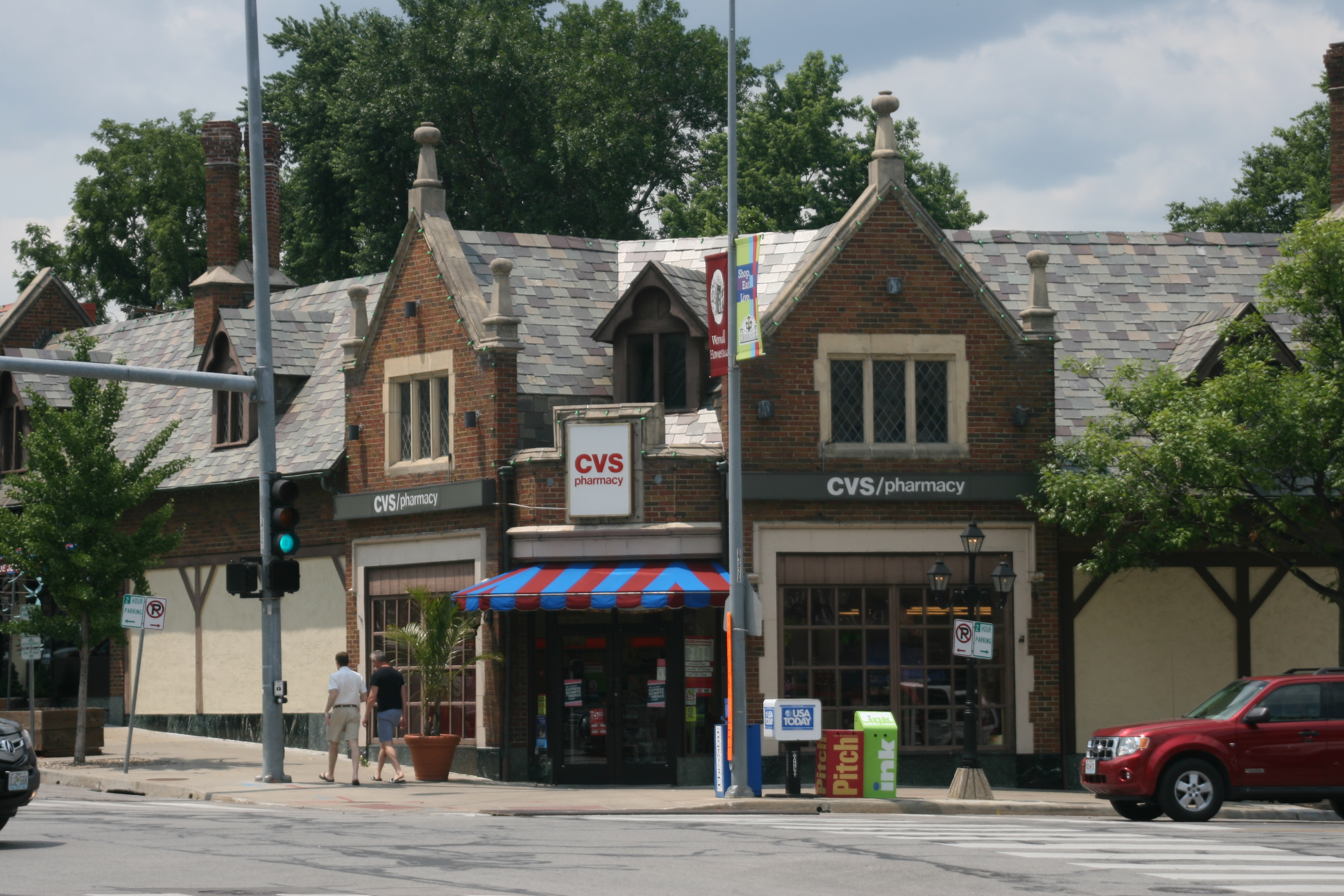
CVS in Brookside Shopping District

The Brookside Shopping District is located in the Brookside neighborhood of Kansas City, Missouri centered at 63rd Street & Brookside Boulevard. The boundaries of the commercial district are Wornall Road to the west, Main Street to the east, 62nd Terrace to the north, and Meyer Blvd to the south.

Developer J.C. Nichols founded the district in 1919 as Kansas City's first suburban shopping center, predating the nearby Country Club Plaza. The district was initially served by the Country Club Line of the Kansas City Streetcar and has since been converted into the Henry Wiggins Trolley Track Trail.

The Brookside Business Association has voluntarily served the area since 1939, promoting area businesses, special activities and events as well as providing for landscaping and trash removal.

The area also features St. Andrew's Episcopal Church built in 1913 and The Wornall Road Baptist Church founded in 1916. Border Star Montessori School, part of the Kansas City Public School system, was originally founded in 1863.

The Brookside Court Park, established in 1951, features pickleball courts and a memorial to local businessman, Bob Arfsten.

Since 1986, the district has hosted the Brookside Art Annual, drawing nearly 70,000 art enthusiasts from across the metropolitan area.

== Tenants ==
- The New Dime Store (established 1939. Closed 2021. )
- Brookside Toy and Science Store (established 1964)
- Cosentino's Brookside Price Chopper
- Cosentino's Brookside Market
- CVS/pharmacy
- Bank of America
- Bank Midwest
- Commerce Bank
- Leopold Gallery (est. 1991)
- Baskin-Robbins Ice Cream/Topsy's Restaurant
- The Roasterie (founded 1993)
- The Brookside Barbershop (Established 1919)
- Brookside Phillips 66
- Beauty Express
- The Brookside Dentist
- Edward Jones
- Renner & Associates Surveying, LLC
- The UPS Store
- United States Postal Service
- Brookside Barkery and Bath
- Michael Forbes Grill
- Jalepeno's
- Charlie Hooper's Bar
- Brookside Real Estate Company
- Stuff
- Sweet And Simple
- Foo's Fabulous Frozen Custard
- World's Window
- Starbucks
- Red Door Grill
- The Brooksider
- Avenues Bistro
- Panera
- Jimmy Johns

== Competition ==
- Country Club Plaza
- Metro Plaza Shopping Center
- The Landing Mall
- Waldo
- Ward Parkway Center
- Waldo Warriors
