= Streetcars in Kansas City =

Transportation infrastructure

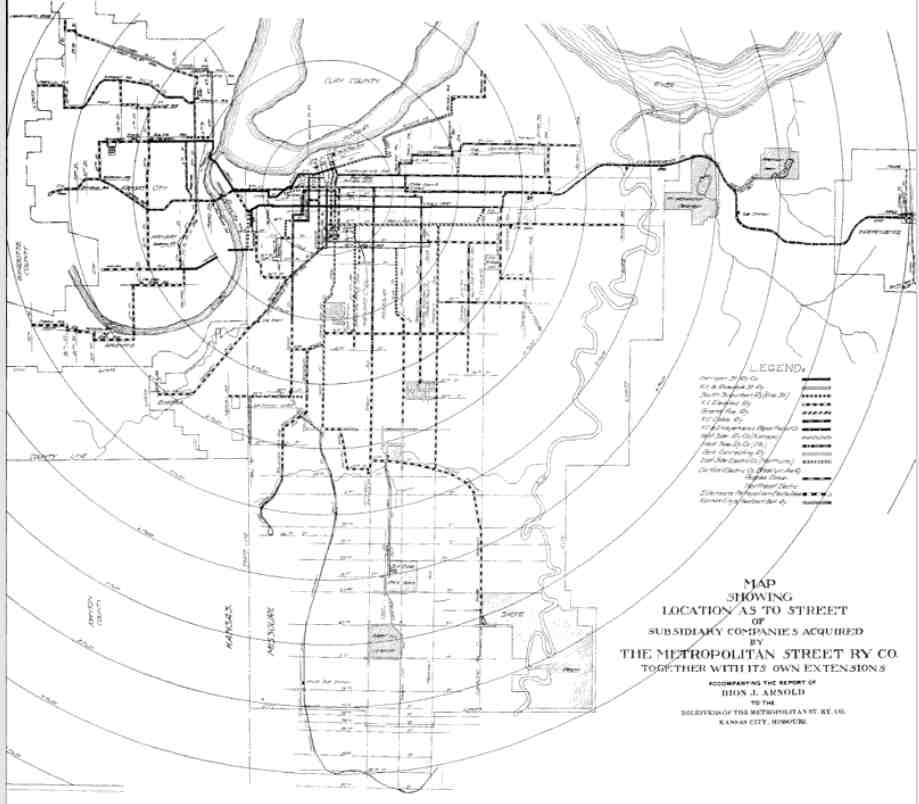
The Kansas City streetcar map peaked at 25 routes, but the last 20th century route was closed in 1957.

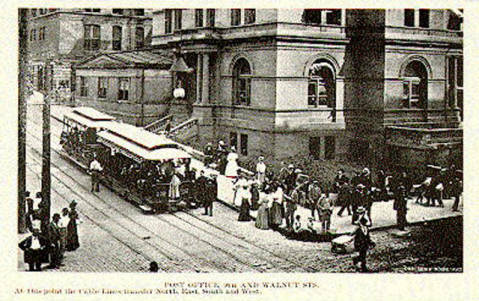
Prior to 1908, streetcars on some routes were propelled by grasping underground cables.

Streetcars in Kansas City were the primary public transit mode during the late 19th and early 20th centuries, like most North American cities. Kansas City, Missouri once had one of the most extensive streetcar systems in North America, but the last of its 25 streetcar routes was shut down in 1957.

Kansas City joined all but five North American metropolises – Toronto, Boston, Philadelphia, San Francisco, and New Orleans – in replacing all streetcar networks with buses. Three other cities, Newark, Pittsburgh, and Cleveland, operated rail lines more akin to modern light rail that remain operating.

In 2016, the modern streetcar era began with the launch of the municipal KC Streetcar.

== History ==
=== 1870–1908: horses, mules, and cables ===
In 1870, horse-drawn streetcars were introduced in Kansas City.

Thomas Corrigan had led his brotherhood of "Corrigan boys" to relocate their road building business to Kansas City and develop its steep, rough hills since 1868. They steadily built the city's first political machine to influence voting in city elections. In 1875, the Corrigan Consolidated Street Railway Company held a municipal monopoly on streetcars, all mule-drawn, and wanted a new 30-year city contract against competition. William Rockhill Nelson, publisher of the newly founded Kansas City Star, considered Corrigan corrupt and favored an upgrade from mules to cable car infrastructure. For two years, he used the Star to lobby against renewing the Corrigans' franchise, saying "competition is necessary for the protection of the public". In 1884, public protest prompted the mayor to veto Corrigan's proposal. The Corrigans' mule car business was sold to Metropolitan Street Railway which turned it into the third largest cable car company in the country.

Cable cars were propelled by gripping moving underground cables, like the San Francisco cable car system. The first in the city, the Kansas City Cable Railroad, opened in June 1885 after issues with mismatched track gauges.

=== 1908: electric streetcars ===
The first electric streetcar operated in Kansas City on September 6, 1889. By 1908, all but one of Kansas City's streetcar routes had been converted to electricity.

When the Kansas City Public Service Company (KCPS) was created in 1925, it inherited over 700 streetcars that had been owned and operated by private companies. The streetcar routes operated by the KCPS also served across the state line in Kansas City, Kansas.

The KCPS planned to replace all its older streetcars with new, state-of-the-art PCC streetcars, which would have required 371 vehicles. Only 24 were delivered prior to World War II, which put a hiatus on new streetcar construction. The KCPS ultimately acquired 184 PCC vehicles.

Famed Kansas City developer J. C. Nichols constructed streetcar lines to serve the new communities he built.

=== 2016 onward: modern streetcars ===
The modern KC Streetcar was installed in 2014 and opened to the public in 2016, with the line initially running from Union Station to the River Market neighborhood. On October 24th, 2025, a major extension south along Main Street to UMKC was opened, which was followed on May 18, 2026 with an extension north to the Riverfront, close to CPKC Stadium. This extension connects CPKC Stadium. Eight new CAF Urbos 3 streetcars have been purchased to service the new extensions to complement the six included in the initial line, bringing the total number of streetcars operating in Kansas City to 14. Daily operations and maintenance of the system is handled by Herzog Transit Services, under joint contract to the Streetcar Authority and the City of Kansas City. The contract was signed in October 2015. Passengers ride for free, as costs are covered by a Transportation Taxation District along the route.

== KCPS 551 ==
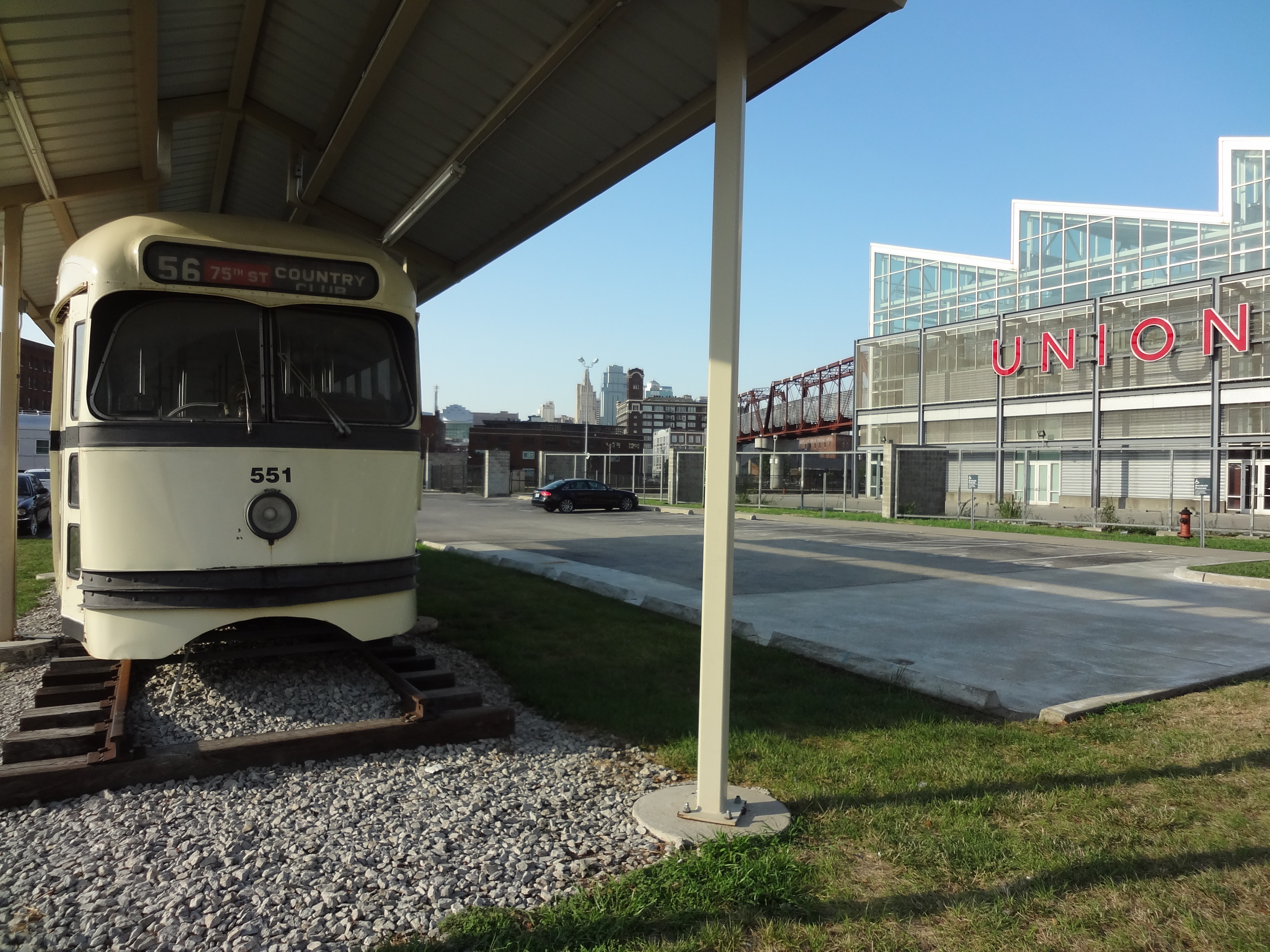
PCC #551 was on static display at Kansas City Union Station.

Kansas City Public Service streetcar 551 is a PCC (President's Conference Committee) streetcar preserved for static display in the River Market neighborhood. It was built in 1947 by the St. Louis Car Company for service in Kansas City. When the city closed its streetcar service, it was sold to the Toronto Transit Commission in 1957 and became TTC 4752. In 1973, the streetcar was sold to the San Francisco Municipal Railway, renumbered as Muni 1190 and ran as a tourist attraction. In 1979, the streetcar was sold to the Western Railway Museum remaining as Muni 1190. In 2006, KC Regional Transit Alliance purchased the streetcar, restored it as KCPS 551 and put it on static display at Union Station. In 2016, the streetcar was put into storage because its Union Station site was repurposed. Finally, in 2017 the streetcar was moved again for display in River Market along the modern KC Streetcar line.

Tentative plans to restore 551 to operating condition and run it on the KC Streetcar line for special events were abandoned because 551 is a single-ended car, and the modern KC Streetcar line has no turning loops.

Streetcar 551 is located on a lot at 426 Delaware Street at the corner of West Fifth Street. Denver-based Epoch Developments owns the streetcar and ten buildings along Delaware Street. The streetcar interior now serves as a donut shop.
