= Marion A. Trozzolo =

American inventor

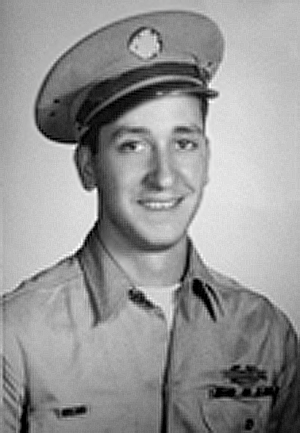
Veteran of World War II, earning the Purple Heart, Bronze Star, Silver Star

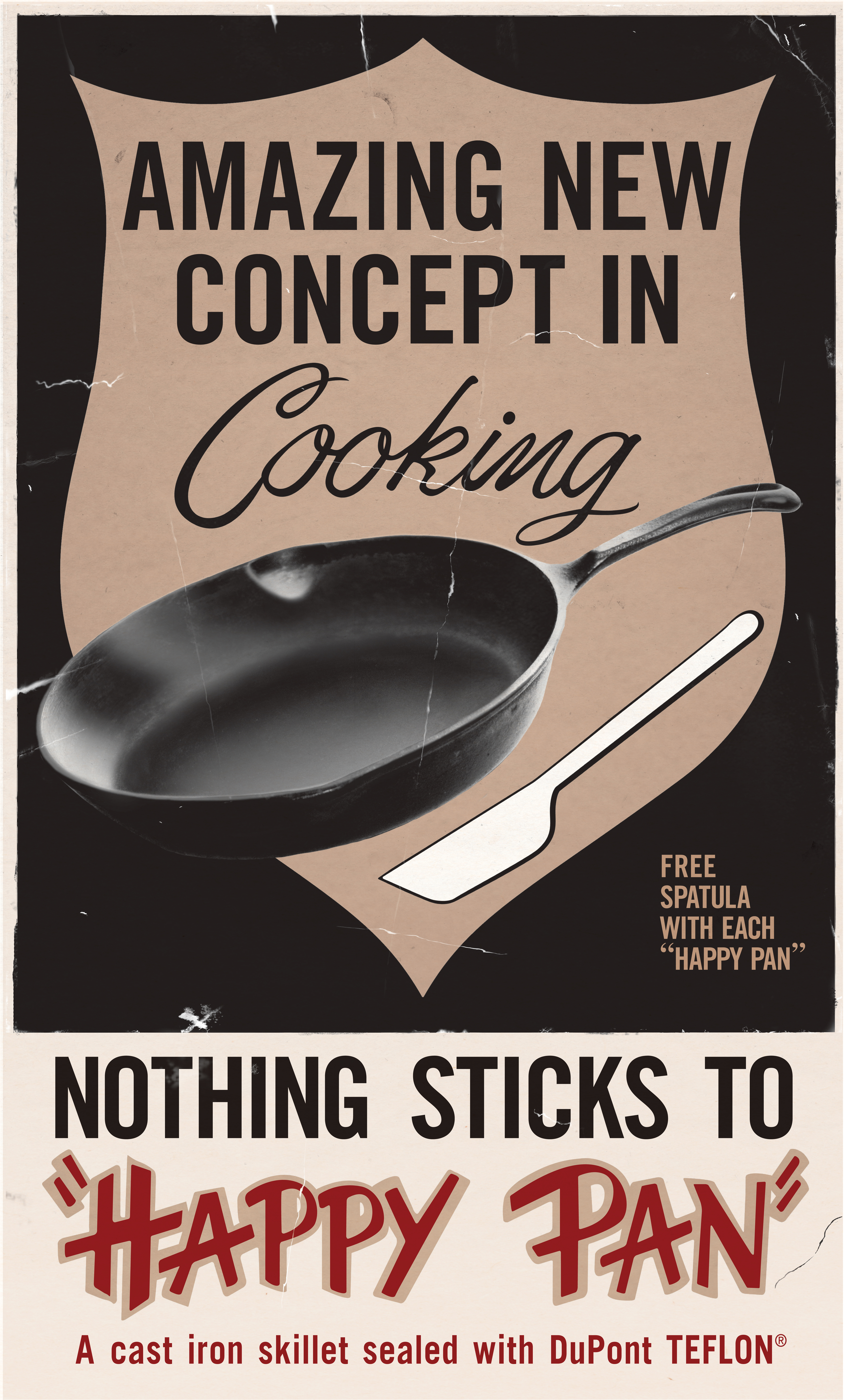
Happy Pan poster

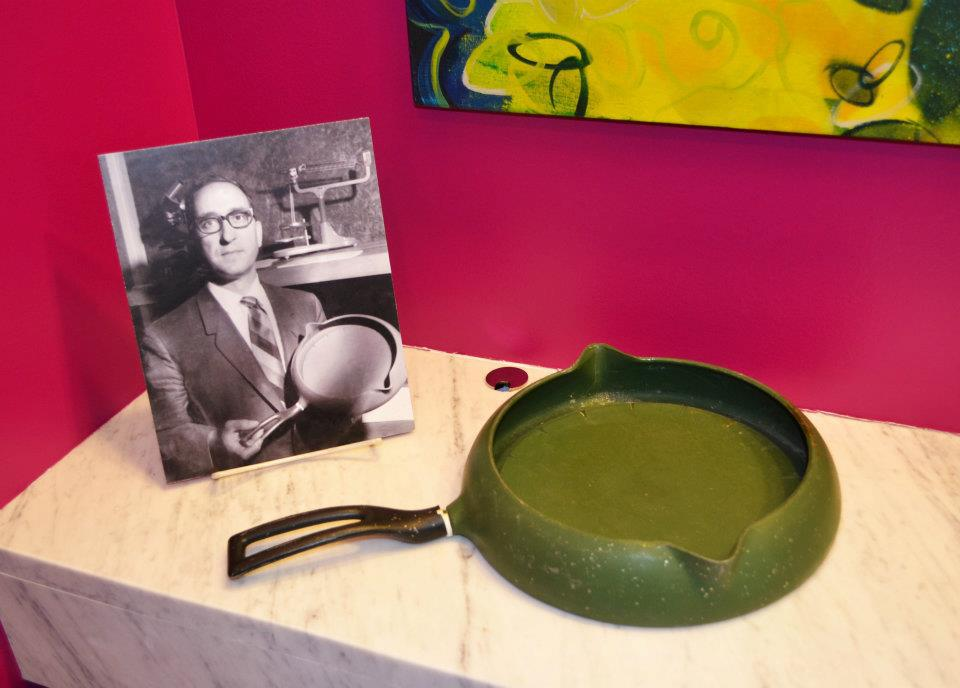
2nd Teflon pan design

Marion A. Trozzolo (1925 – June 30, 1992) was an innovator, inventor, entrepreneur, and professor of business at Rockhurst University in Kansas City, Missouri. He was the first manufacturer of teflon coated cookware in the United States, and was the developer of the Kansas City entertainment district River Quay.

== Biography ==
=== Early life and education ===
Trozzolo was born in Castrolibero, Italy, and was one of three brothers. His family immigrated to Chicago, Illinois in 1927 for a better life for their children. A veteran of World War II, Trozzolo earned a Bronze Star and a Purple Heart for his service. After the war, he attended the University of Chicago, where he received a bachelor's degree in philosophy and a master's degree in business administration.

=== Career ===
Trozzolo moved to Kansas City, Missouri, in 1951 to pursue a career as a professor of business administration and economics at Rockhurst University.

==== The Happy Pan ====
In 1957 he founded Laboratory Plasticware Fabricators, producing plastic-coated scientific utensils, including a Teflon-coated magnetic stirring rod. He eventually experimented with coating pans and E. I. duPont deNemours & Company executives endorsed the plan. In 1961 he unveiled the "Happy Pan", a Teflon coated frying pan. Trozzolo sold the company in 1972.

An original Happy Pan is now in the collection of the Smithsonian Institution.

During the presidency of Ronald Reagan, Trozzolo marketed Teflon coat mementos in honor of the "Teflon president." He also donated a Teflon coating for the fence around the Harry S. Truman home in Independence, Missouri.

=== River Quay ===
The name "Quay" means a landing place by a body of water, and the pronunciation is "key". The name was selected because the area's northern boundary is the Missouri River and the district is the site of Westport Landing, a stopping place for explorers and settlers of the West. This is where Kansas City began.

As early as 1958, Trozzolo discovered the charm of the old buildings surrounding the city market. Over the years he acquired over 30 buildings. By 1971, a real community of small shops was forming and on June 30, 1972, River Quay was officially born. In two years it grew to include over 80 shops and restaurants which attracted thousands of people each year. The entertainment district was similar to Ghirardelli Square in San Francisco, California or Old Town, Chicago. Its initial slogan was "The New Old Town." In 1973, he said, "We have a real feeling of community. People are happy here. Even the shoppers and business people who come just for lunch are smiling and more relaxed." Perhaps that is why River Quay's slogan became "A community in downtown Kansas City, rich in leisure, arts, craftsmanship and 19th century flavor."

Trozzolo was especially creative in his marketing campaign of "The River Quay". He imported three red double-decker buses from Great Britain and began to run bus routes all over town. Promoting and encouraging people to "Come see... The River Quay" (the official slogan) with bill boards and painted signs.

During 1981 Trozzolo joined with Kansas City Star newspaper columnist Frederick Louis Richardson in developing a motion picture project based upon the mafia incursion into the River Quay. The screenplay by Richardson entitled "Battle for the River Quay" was promoted by the Rivery Quay Company, a corporation in which the writer and Trozzolo were partnered. The chairman of Paramount Pictures, Barry Diller had expressed an interest in reviewing the script, however the project stalled before being abandoned.

=== Marriage and children ===
He was married to his wife Phyllis for 35 years. They had seven children, Alexandra, Angela, Andrea, Anita, Peter, Jon and Alisa.

=== Death and afterward ===
Trozzolo died of cancer June 30, 1992.
