= Kansas City Public Service Company =

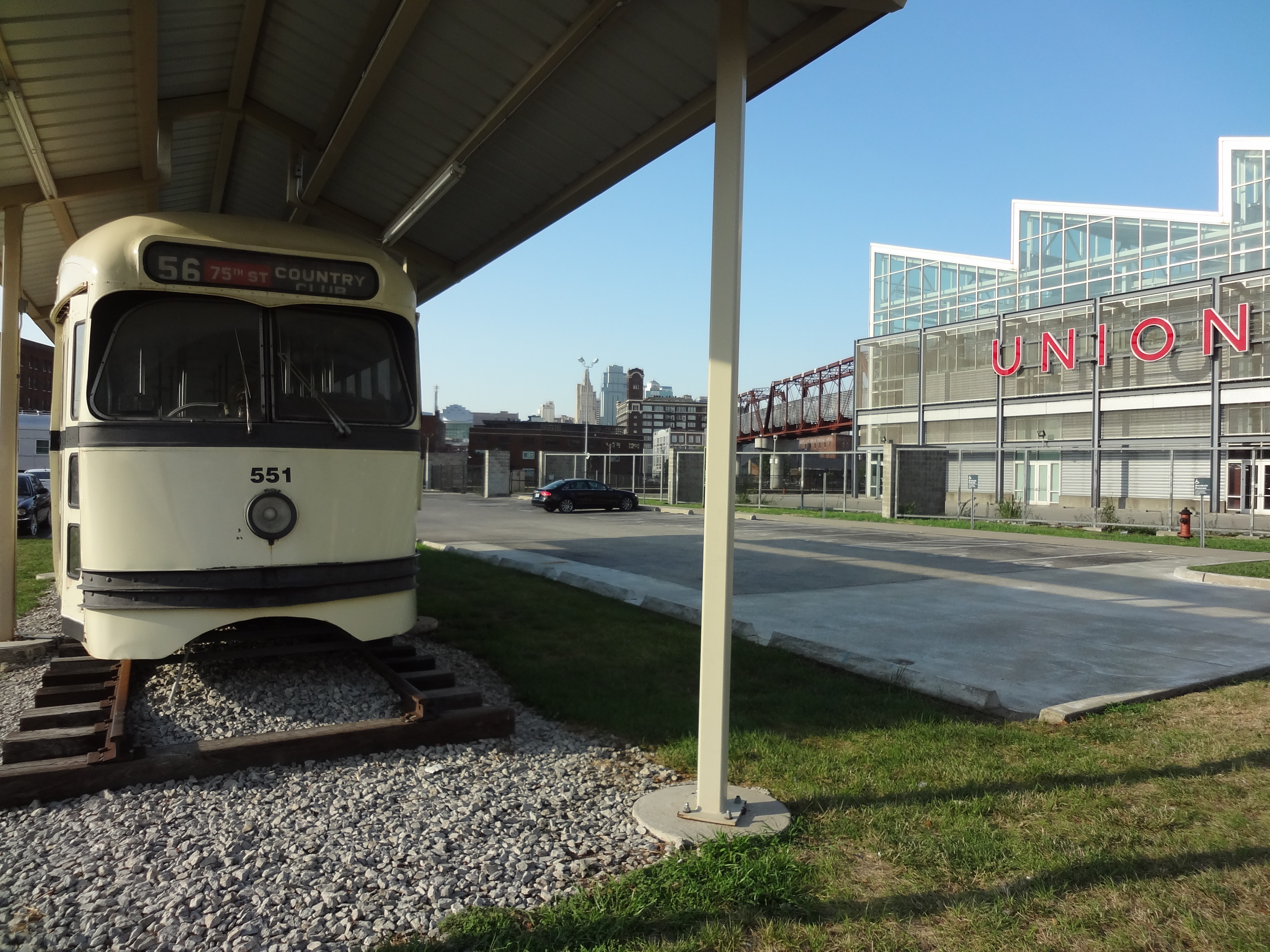
PCC #551 was on static display at Union Station.

The Kansas City Public Service Company is the formerly most well known name for a set of defunct public transit operators in Kansas City, Missouri, until being sold to the Kansas City Area Transportation Authority in 1969.

Streetcars in Kansas City began as horsecar operations in 1869, followed by cable cars and electrification after the 1880s. Multiple operators had different names during the consolidation and post-consolidation period.

- Metropolitan Street Railway Company (1886-1911), but it did not control all independent systems until 1905.
- Kansas City Railway & Light Company (1901-1916), became the parent company of the Metropolitan when it formed.
- Kansas City Railways Company (1911-1925), a reorganization of the Metropolitan under the same ownership and then spun off into its own company.
- Kansas City Public Service Company (1926-1960)
- Kansas City Transit (1960-1969), a name change for the Public Service Company

Kansas City acquired 184 PCC streetcars after 1941, but streetcar operations ceased in June 1957. Over the history of streetcar operations, there were 25 streetcar routes in Kansas City operating on 318 miles of track. Twenty-nine of the PCC cars were later acquired by the Toronto Transit Commission. One car was returned to Kansas City in 2006 and restored as KCPS 551 after serving in Toronto (ex-TTC 4752) and San Francisco (ex Muni 1190). It was placed on static display initially at Kansas City Union Station and later in 2017 at River Market.

One of the most famous routes, The Country Club Line, had rail until the 1990s when it became a hike and bike recreation trail.

== See also ==
- St. Louis Car Company
- Streetcars in Kansas City
