= Kansas City Area Transportation Authority =

Public transit agency in metropolitan Kansas City

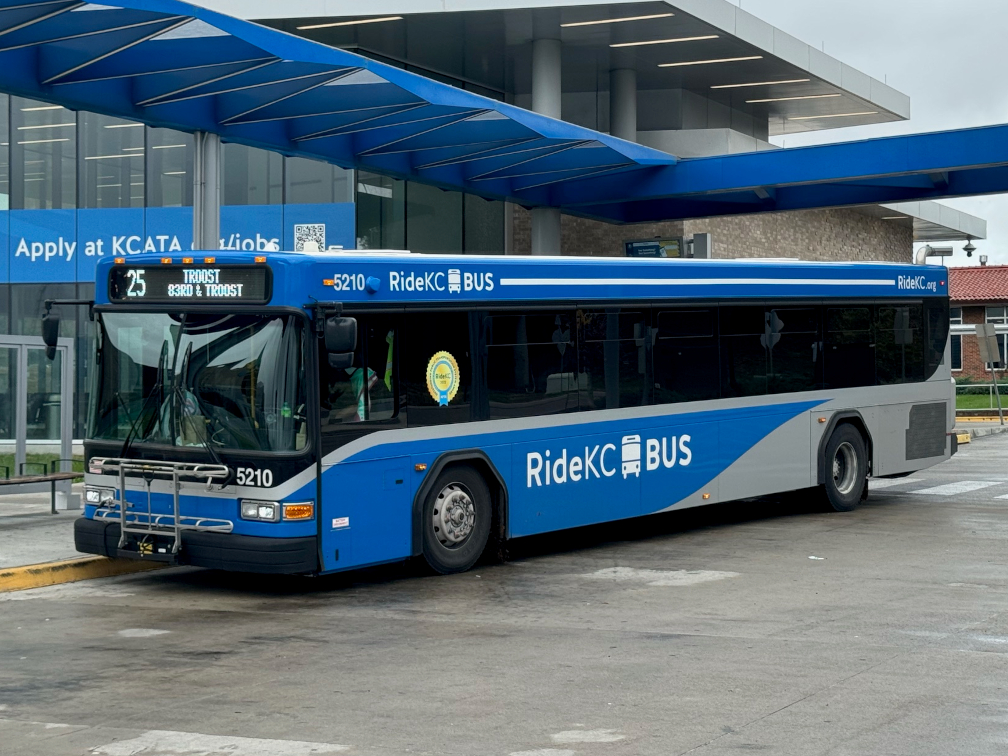
- Kansas City Area Transportation Authority bus in RideKC livery
- Founded: 1969
- Headquarters: 1200 E. 18th Street; Kansas City, Missouri
- Service area: Kansas City Metro Area
- Service type: Bus service Express bus service Bus rapid transit Paratransit
- Routes: 78 Bus routes 6 MetroFlex routes 3 Bus rapid transit routes 1 Streetcar Line
- Stops: 6,504 Bus Stops 113 MAX Stations
- Fleet: 300 buses 31 MAX buses
- Daily ridership: 32,000 (weekdays, Q1 2026)
- Annual ridership: 11,615,300 (2025)
- Website: ridekc.org kcata.org

The Kansas City Area Transportation Authority (KCATA) is a public transit agency in metropolitan Kansas City. It operates the Metro Area Express (MAX) bus rapid transit service in Kansas City, Missouri, and 78 local bus routes in seven counties of Missouri and Kansas. In 2025, the system had a ridership of 11,615,300, about 32,000 per weekday as of the first quarter of 2026.

== History ==
The KCATA is a bi-state agency formed by an interstate compact between Kansas and Missouri in 1965–6. Authorized by both states' legislatures and an act of Congress, the agency's jurisdiction includes Cass, Clay, Jackson and Platte counties in Missouri and Johnson, Leavenworth and Wyandotte counties in Kansas. The agency is governed by a board of ten commissioners, five from each state. Operations began in 1969, when the KCATA took over bus routes previously run by the Kansas City Public Service Company.

In 2014, KCATA, Johnson County Transit, UG Transit, and IndeBus announced that all services would be merged into one service, RideKC by 2019. The Johnson County, KS Commissioners pulled out of the KCATA management agreement effective August 1, 2022, but retained the partnership with the regional RideKC transit branding and planning.

== Fares ==
KCATA became a fare-free system in March 2020 as part of a proposal from the city government combined with changes due to the COVID-19 pandemic. The program was initially funded by a $4.8 million line item in the annual budget and later by federal pandemic relief funding. The base fare was previously $1.50 for adult passengers and a reduced rate for students, veterans, senior citizens, and people with disabilities. Monthly passes were valid for 31 consecutive days from first activation, while day passes are only able to be used for one service day. Visitor passes could be purchased online and were valid for three consecutive days. Most passes were accepted across regional transit providers.

Fares were reintroduced on June 1, 2026. The $2 base fare was selected to prevent cuts to bus service in the city.

== Transit hubs ==
There are many Transit Centers and major Park and Rides in the RideKC service area.

=== Transit Centers ===
- Boardwalk Square
- Antioch Center
- Independence Transit Center
- 10th & Main Transit Center
- 7th & Minnesota Transit Center
- Bannister & Drury Transit Center
- Mission Transit Center
- Village West Transit Center
- Blue Ridge Crossing

=== Major Park & Rides ===
- Metro North Park & Ride
- 47th & State Ave Metrocenter Park & Ride
- 3rd & Grand Park & Ride
- 74th Terrace & Broadway Park & Ride
- 31st & Troost Park & Ride
- Oak Park Mall Park & Ride
- 4th & Nelson Park & Ride
- Shawnee Station Park & Ride
- JCCC Carlesn Center Park & Ride
- KU Edwards Park & Ride
- Great Mall of the Great Plains Park & Ride

== Bus rapid transit ==
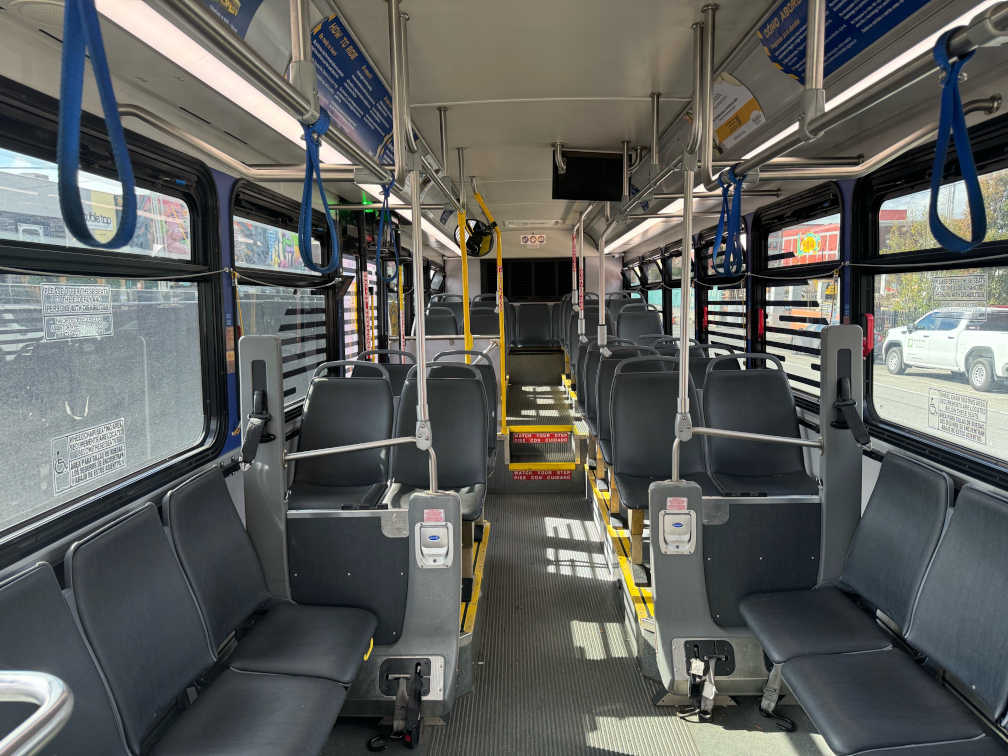
Interior of a 2019 Gillig BRT Plus 40' CNG used for Metro Area Express service.

Bus rapid transit in Kansas City debuted with the launch of Metro Area Express in July 2005. The 12-mile (19 km) corridor on Main Street links the River Market, Downtown, Crown Center and the Plaza Area. A second BRT line, on 13 miles (21 km) of Troost Avenue, started service on January 1, 2011. The third line, along the Prospect Avenue corridor, began service in December 2019.
