= Sullivan, Kentucky =

Unincorporated community in Kentucky, United States

Sullivan
- Unincorporated community
- Location within the state of Kentucky Sullivan (the United States)
- Coordinates: 37°29′51″N 87°56′43″W
- Country: United States
- State: Kentucky
- County: Union
- Elevation: 374 ft (114 m)
- Time zone: UTC-6 (Central (CST))
  - Summer (DST): UTC-5 (CST)
- ZIP codes: 42460
- GNIS feature ID: 504720

Sullivan is an unincorporated community and coal town in Union County, Kentucky, United States.

A post office named Sullivan opened in 1887.
