= Metro Area Express =

Bus service in Kansas City, Missouri, USA

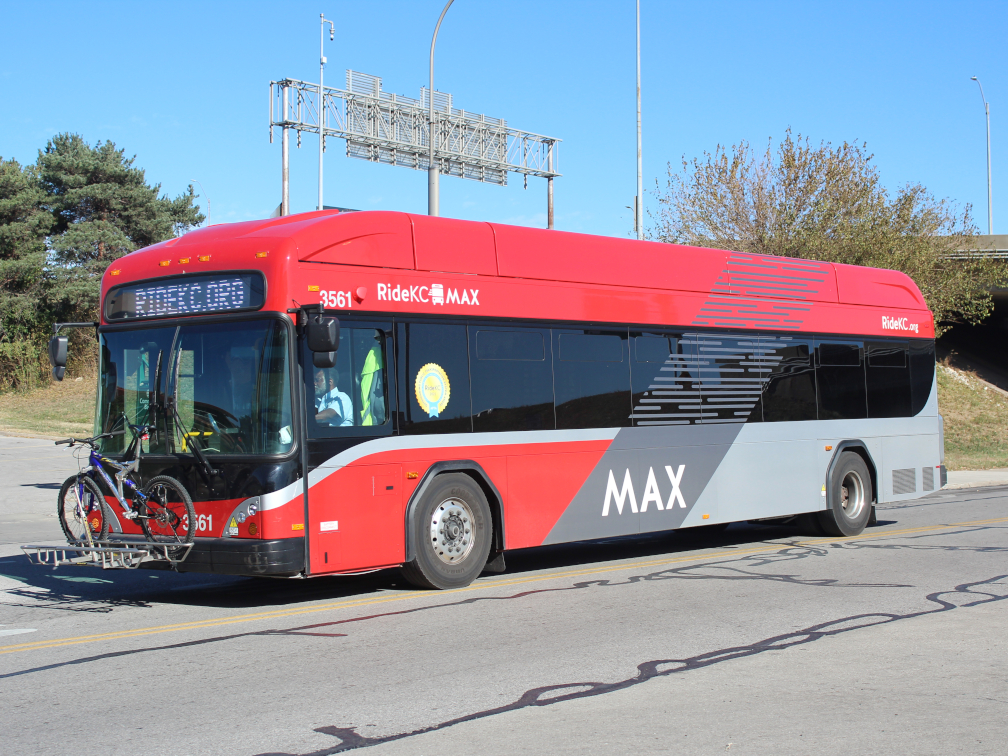

Overview
- Status: Operating
- Locale: Kansas City Metro Area
- Stations: 53 Currently

Service
- Type: Bus rapid transit
- System: Kansas City Area Transportation Authority
- Services: 2 Routes; 4 Planned
- Rolling stock: 28 Gillig Low Floor buses
- Daily ridership: 2,155 (2020)
- Ridership: 955,303 (2024)

History
- Opened: 24 July 2005

Technical
- Line length: 32-mile (51 km)

The Metro Area Express (MAX) is a bus rapid transit service run by the Kansas City Area Transportation Authority in Kansas City, Missouri, United States.

Its first line, on Main Street, was first operated on July 24, 2005; the second line, on Troost Avenue, opened on January 1, 2011; and the third line, on Prospect Avenue, opened on December 9, 2019.

== Lines ==
=== Troost Avenue MAX (TMAX) ===
The Troost Avenue MAX runs mostly on Troost Avenue in Kansas City, Missouri. The line launched on January 1, 2011. It runs from Barney Allis Plaza located in Downtown Kansas City Missouri to 3-Trails Transit Center in Ruskin Heights, with two of every three runs short turning at 75th Street.

=== Prospect Avenue MAX (PMAX) ===
The Prospect Avenue MAX runs mostly on Prospect Avenue in Kansas City, Missouri. The line runs from Barney Allis Plaza in Downtown KCMO to 75th and Prospect with a possible extension to Bannister and Drury. Cerner is redeveloping the old Bannister Mall site into an office park. The line began service on December 9, 2019.

== Discontinued Lines ==
=== Main Street MAX (MMAX) ===
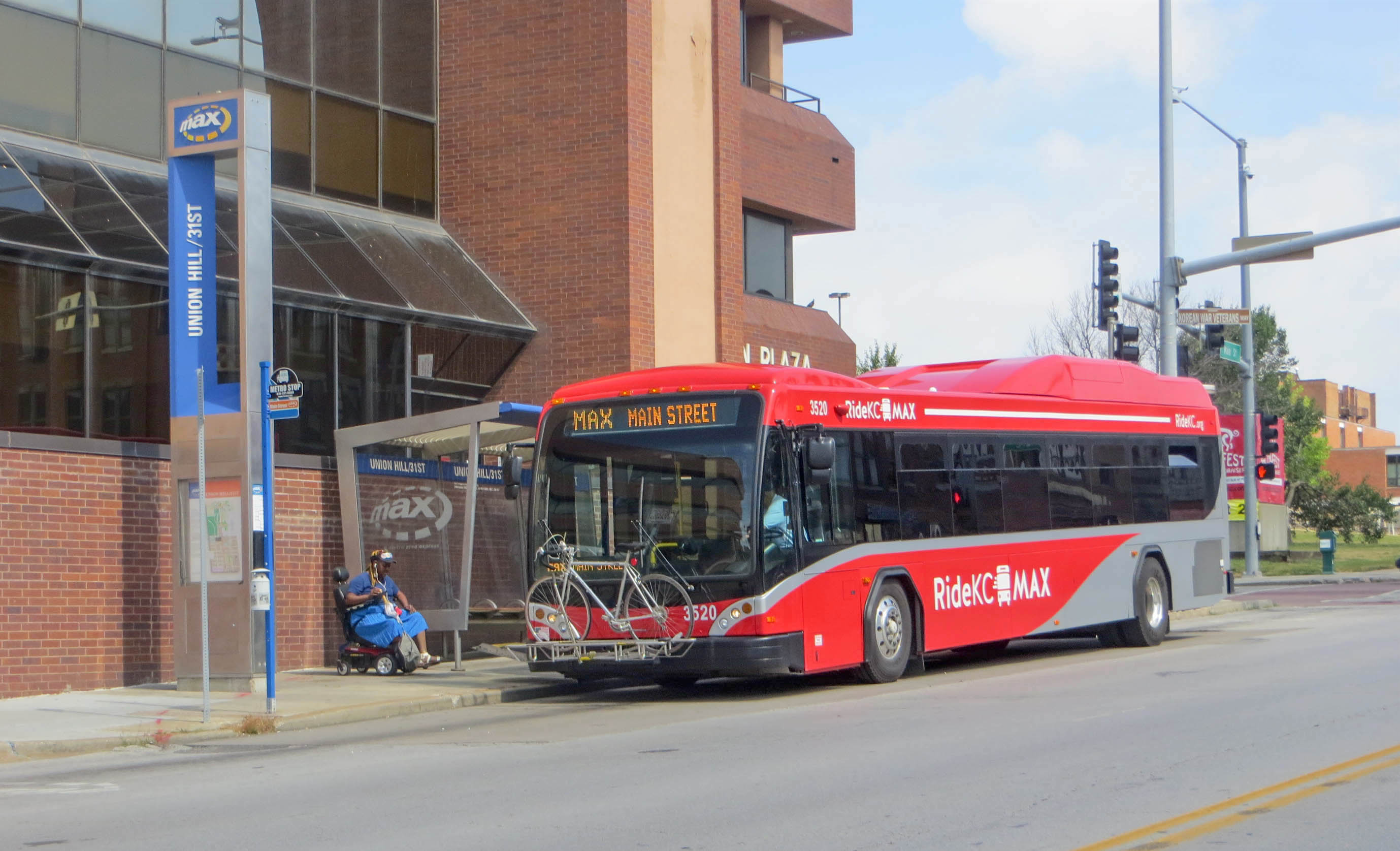
A MAX bus on Main Street in 2016. This service and stop were replaced by the Kansas City Streetcar's UMKC extension in 2025.

The Main Street MAX was a route that mostly ran along Main Street in Kansas City, Missouri. It ran from City Market in Downtown Kansas City, MO to the Waldo neighborhood. The line was inaugurated on July 24, 2005 and was in operation until October 19th, 2025 when it was replaced by the extension of the KC Streetcar to the UMKC campus.
