= Armour Hills, Kansas City, Missouri =

Neighborhood of Kansas City, Missouri, U.S.

Coordinates: 39°00′22″N 94°35′20″W

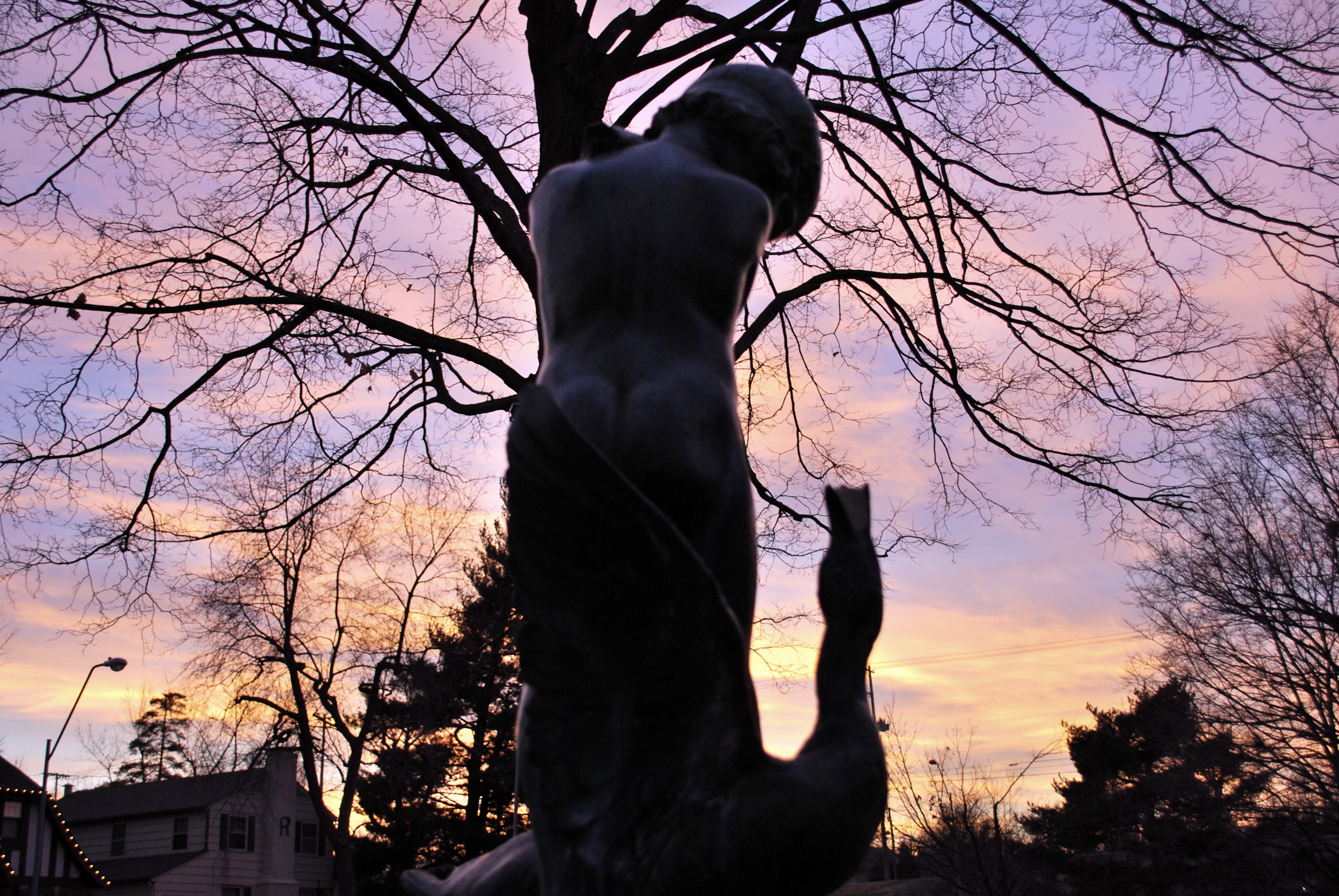
Armour Center Fountain built in 1924

Armour Hills is a neighborhood located in Kansas City, Missouri. It is bounded on the west by Brookside Road, on the north by 65th Street, on the east by Oak Street and on the south by Gregory Boulevard. The neighborhood is named after the Armour family, who previously owned the land. It consists of 1,062 residential lots and 8 commercial lots.

The neighborhood is characterized by the different styles of homes, including Tudor Revival, Cape Cod, and Dutch Colonials built with brick, stone, and wood in many different sizes.

== See also ==
- List of neighborhoods in Kansas City, Missouri
- Brookside, Kansas City, Missouri
