= Brookside, Kansas City =

Collection of neighborhoods located in Kansas City, Missouri

Coordinates: 39°00′50″N 94°35′26″W

Brookside is a collection of neighborhoods located in Kansas City, Missouri, bounded by 55th Street on the North, Gregory on the South, Ward Parkway on the West, and Troost on the East. The neighborhood contains the Brookside Shopping District.

Brookside makes up one portion of the Country Club District, the largest contiguous master-planned community in the United States. Brookside, and the Country Club District, was designed by J.C. Nichols.

The John Wornall House is a local landmark on the National Register of Historic Places located in Brookside.

== See also ==
- Armour Hills, Kansas City, Missouri
- Neighborhoods of Kansas City, Missouri and Kansas City, Kansas
