= KC Streetcar =

Streetcar in Missouri, US

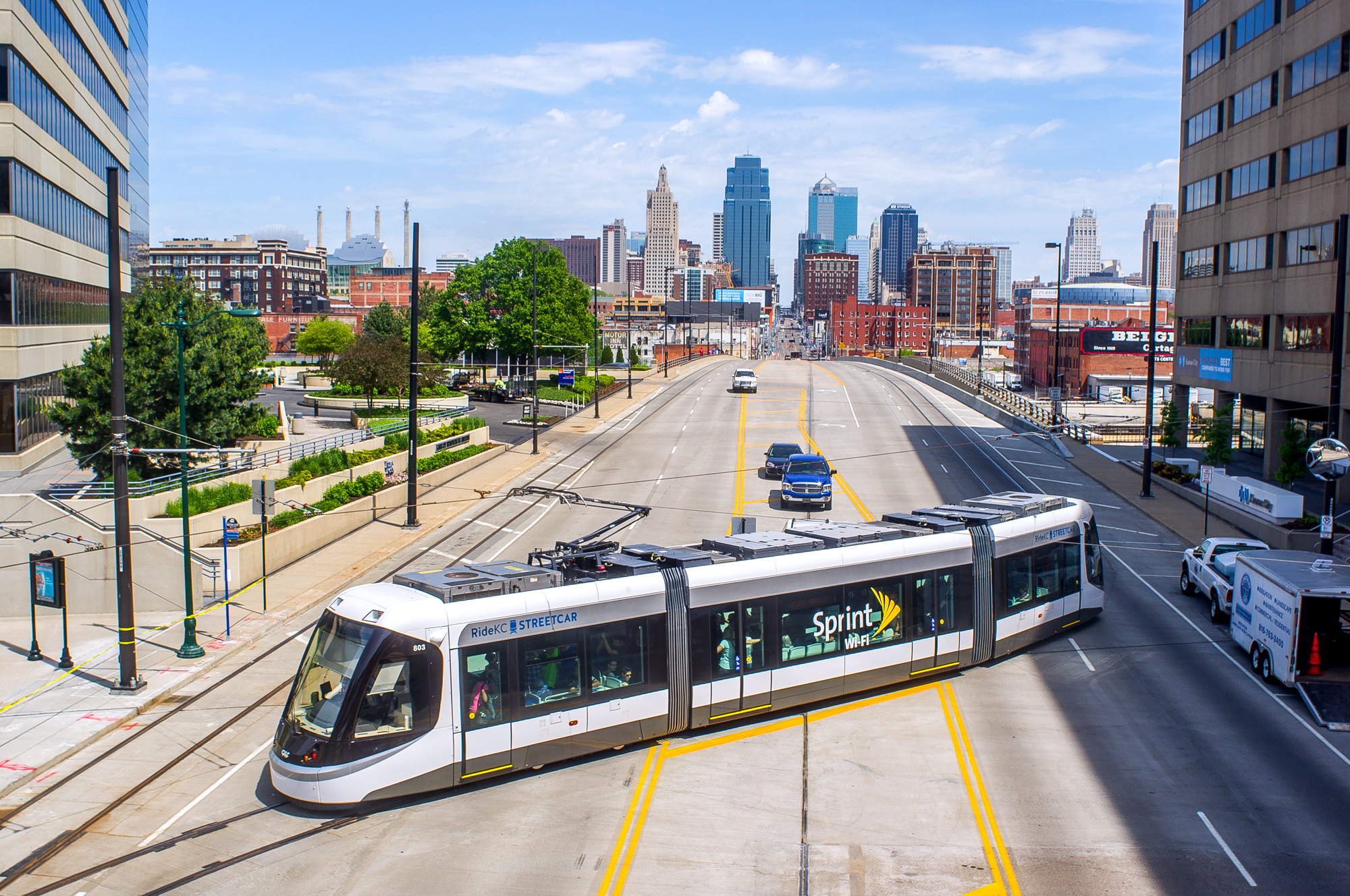
- A streetcar leaves Union Station, northbound

Overview
- Owner: City of Kansas City
- Locale: Kansas City, Missouri, US
- Transit type: Streetcar
- Number of lines: 1
- Line number: 601
- Number of stations: 19
- Daily ridership: 14,378
- Annual ridership: 2,155,081
- Website: kcstreetcar.org

Operation
- Began operation: May 6, 2016
- Operator: Kansas City Streetcar Authority
- Character: Street running
- Number of vehicles: 14 CAF Urbos 3s
- Train length: 3
- Headway: 10–15 minutes

Technical
- System length: 6.4 mi (10.3 km)
- Track gauge: 4 ft 8 1/2 in (1,435 mm) standard gauge
- Electrification: Overhead line, 750 V DC
System map
KC Streetcar highlighted in blue

The KC Streetcar is a one-route streetcar system in Kansas City, Missouri. Initial construction began in May 2014, and service began on May 6, 2016. The KC Streetcar is part of the Kansas City metropolitan area's integrated public transit brand RideKC, and is operated by the Kansas City Streetcar Authority. It is free to ride, as a transportation development district covers the cost of ongoing operations and maintenance. As of July 2026, the KC Streetcar has had over 20 million rides since its opening in 2016.

The initial line was 2.2 miles (3.5 km) long, costing $102 million to build. In October 2025, the line was extended 3.5 miles (5.6 km) south to the University of Missouri–Kansas City (UMKC) at a cost of $350 million. In May 2026, the line was extended 0.7 miles (1.1 km) north to Berkley Riverfront Park at a cost of $62 million. In the RideKC system, the KC Streetcar is internally designated as route 601.

== History ==
=== Development ===
After earlier efforts to create a metro-wide or city-wide rail transit system was voted down, voters in downtown Kansas City approved funding for a two-mile streetcar line in December 2012.

In December 2012, the city council awarded a contract to HDR, Inc. to complete a final design for the downtown streetcar line. HDR had previously performed preliminary engineering work. In October 2013, it was announced that Construcciones y Auxiliar de Ferrocarriles (CAF) would build low-floor Urbos 3 streetcars for the line. Pre-construction work, utility-relocation work in preparation for the project, began in late 2013, and construction of the line began in May 2014. Construction was completed in late 2015, with the first streetcar arriving in November 2015 and testing was performed from December 2015 to May 2016.

The projected cost of the Downtown streetcar was $102 million. The majority of funds came from Special Obligation Bonds of the City of Kansas City, Missouri totaling $64 million. Construction bonds and operating costs were repaid by a special assessment and 1% sales tax collected inside a transportation development district (TDD) approved by voters in 2012. Both levies are assessed only within the taxing district, which encompasses downtown neighborhoods along the streetcar route. Additional funding included a utility contribution and two federal grants totaling $17.1 million. The project received another $20 million federal grant, through the Transportation Investment Generating Economic Recovery (TIGER) program, in August 2013. Passengers ride free of charge, as operating costs are covered by the TDD. Total construction costs were $250,000 under budget and operations costs started out under budget.

=== Opening ===
KC Streetcar operation began along a 2.2-mile-long (3.5 km) route on May 6, 2016, at approximately 11am. The total opening Friday and Saturday ridership was over 27,000 rides, with the trains travelling 650 miles (1,050 km). The weekend celebration for the streetcar's opening included music, a free carnival, fireworks, and coordinated specials at businesses. Bus service and bike share service was free to correspond with the launch. City officials stated the line exceeded their expectations, with over 100,000 rides in the first two weeks, and one million rides after 5 months.

Following initial high ridership, two additional streetcars were ordered from CAF to service demand. The line celebrated 5 million rides in September 2018. On July 5, 2019, the streetcar set a one-day ridership record, with 15,559 rides.

The COVID-19 pandemic heavily impacted ridership, which dropped by two-thirds to just 2,148 daily rides in 2020. In 2021, ridership levels recovered, but to levels lower than before the pandemic. The line celebrated 10 million rides in April 2022. During the 2023 NFL draft three-day weekend in April 2023, nearly 60,000 rides were taken and a one-day ridership record was set on April 27, with 21,601 riders. In December 2023, KC Streetcar noted that demand had recovered to 95% of pre-pandemic levels on weekends, and 80% on weekdays. On December 20, 2025 (the Saturday before Christmas), the streetcar set a one-day ridership record, with 24,965 rides. During the 2026 FIFA World Cup, the streetcar set a new one day ridership record on several occasions, thanks to the FIFA Fan Fest and matches at the Arrowhead Stadium.

=== Extensions ===
Expansion planning began in 2014. Two studies covered one line north, crossing the Missouri River and eight lines heading east, west and south from downtown. A ballot proposition in August 2014 to add three new rail lines and an improved bus line failed 40%–60%. A grassroots effort to revisit expansion using the same legal structure as the starter line was funded by the private sector.

==== South to UMKC ====
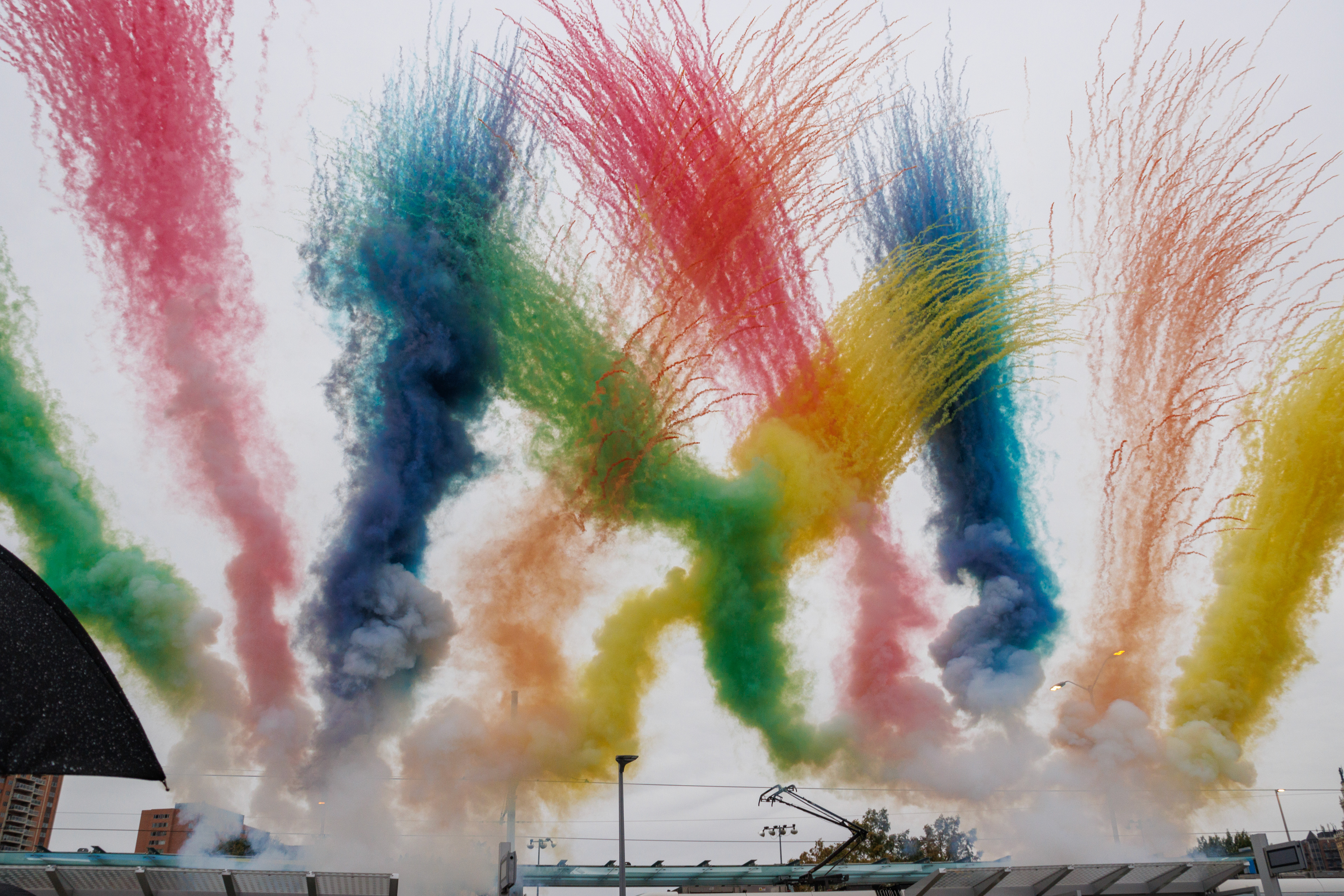
Celebrations at the opening of the extension to University of Missouri–Kansas City (UMKC) in October 2025

In August 2017, voters approved the formation of a transportation development district (TDD) to help fund the construction and operating cost of a 3.5-mile-long (5.6 km) extension south towards UMKC. In December 2020, the Federal Transit Administration (FTA) announced it had awarded $174 million for the extension, with the remaining $177 million of funding coming from the expanded TDD. Groundbreaking occurred on April 6, 2022. In July 2023, Mayor of Kansas City Quinton Lucas called for transit-only lanes on Main Street as part of the work. On August 17, 2024, streetcars drove south of Pershing Road for the first time since 1957 during track testing for the new line. The new track was fully connected with the original track on October 22, 2024. The extension to UMKC opened on October 24, 2025. Following opening of the extension, ridership more than doubled – with residents and visitors praising the line.

==== North to Riverfront ====
In August 2017, the KC Port Authority announced plans to extend the line 0.7 miles (1.1 km) north from the River Market toward the Missouri River, connecting to Berkley Riverfront Park and the Kansas City Current soccer stadium (CPKC Stadium). The extension would be funded by the KC Port Authority, as well as by federal TIGER funding. In December 2020, $14.2 million was awarded by the FTA towards the extension, with additional funding required from local sources. A groundbreaking ceremony for the project took place on March 1, 2024, with completion anticipated in 2026. By December 2025, construction had been completed and testing was underway. The extension opened on May 18, 2026, following a press conference.

== Route ==
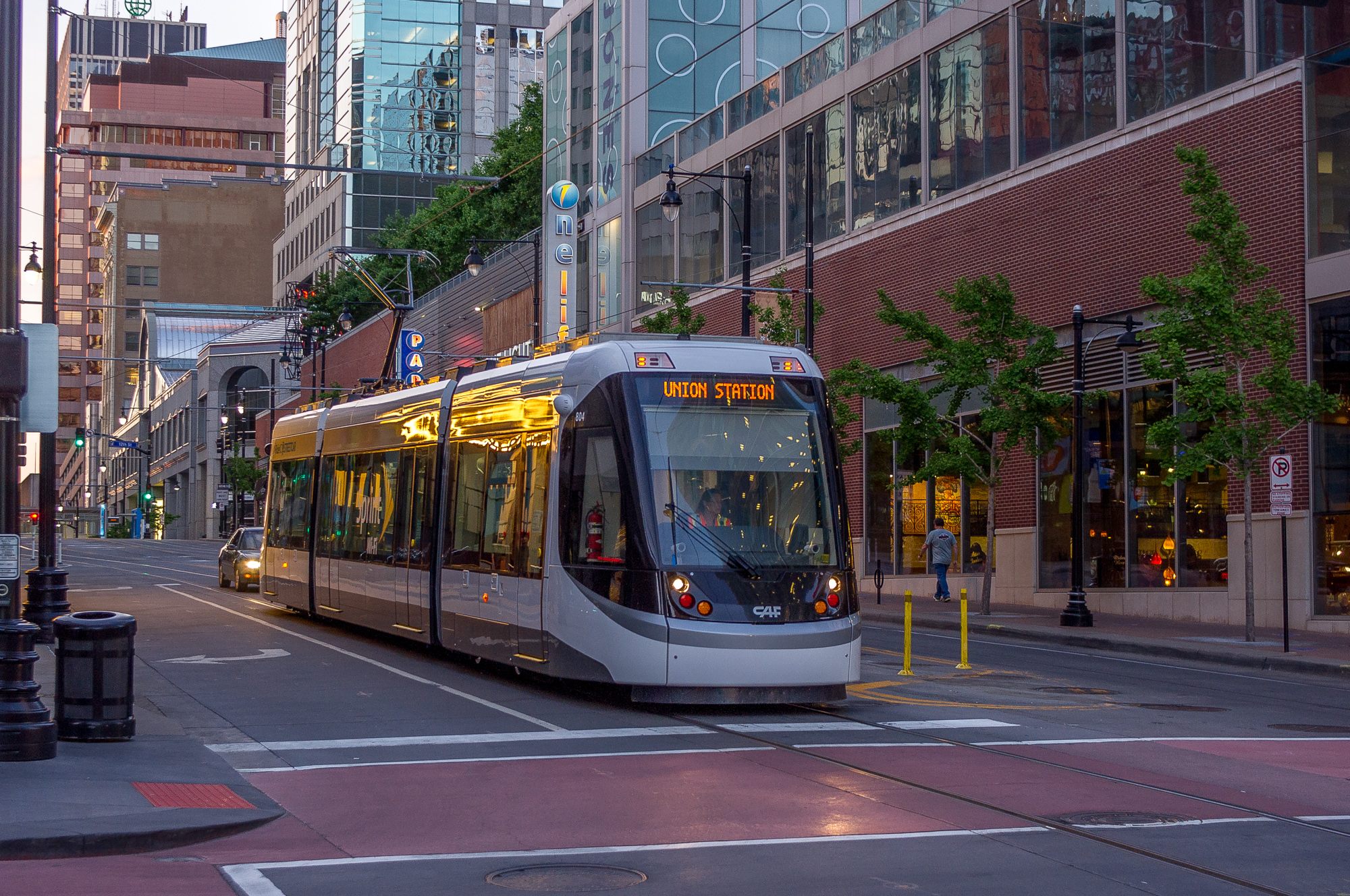
A streetcar heads southbound on Main Street

The KC Streetcar runs along a 6.4-mile-long (10.3 km) route between Berkley Riverfront Park and the University of Missouri–Kansas City (UMKC), running through the River Market, central business district, and the Crossroads, mostly along Main Street. KC Streetcar makes stops about every two blocks in Downtown and every four blocks south of there, with 18 designated stops. On Main Street south of Union Station, KC Streetcar uses transit-only lanes. It connects directly with Amtrak, local and commuter RideKC bus services (including a direct route to Kansas City International Airport) and several RideKC bike-share kiosks. Proponents tout the initial segment as one of the simplest and straightest modern streetcar routes in the United States.

=== Stations ===
All platforms offer level boarding and real-time arrival information.

Station	Directions	Location	Notes
Riverfront	2-way	Berkley Riverfront	
River Market (formerly River Market North)	2-way	3rd Street & Grand Boulevard	
Delaware (formerly River Market West)	1-way	4th Street & Delaware Street	
City Market	1-way	5th Street & Walnut Street	
North Loop	2-way	7th Street & Main Street	
Library	2-way	9th Street & Main Street	
Metro Center	2-way	12th Street & Main Street	
Power & Light	2-way	14th Street & Main Street	
Kauffman Center	2-way	16th Street & Main Street	
Crossroads	2-way	19th Street & Main Street	
Union Station	2-way	Pershing Road & Main Street	
WWI Museum & Memorial	2-way	27th Street & Main Street	
Union Hill	2-way	31st Street & Main Street	
Armour	2-way	Armour Boulevard & Main Street	
Westport	2-way	39th Street & Main Street	Just north of Westport Road
Southmoreland	2-way	43rd Street & Main Street	
Art Museums	2-way	45th Street & Main Street	
Plaza	2-way	Emanuel Cleaver II Boulevard & Brookside Boulevard	
UMKC	2-way	51st Street & Brookside Boulevard	

== Ridership ==
The line was originally projected to have a daily average ridership of just 2,700. Outside of the COVID-19 pandemic, average yearly ridership levels between 2016 and 2026 were around double this figure. Following the opening of the extensions north to Riverfront and south to UMKC, ridership doubled to an average of around 10,000 daily riders. The streetcar is free to ride, and is funded by the local transportation development district. Ridership is calculated by the use of automatic, anonymous passenger counters at each streetcar door – with manual checks to ensure accuracy. In 2025, KC Streetcar had 1,900 average daily boardings per mile, surpassing other major U.S. system such as Metro Rail in Los Angeles, California, or METRORail in Houston, Texas.

KC Streetcar ridership
	Ridership	Average daily ridership	Cumulative ridership
2016	1,399,153 (Note: 2016 ridership figures start from May 6, 2016, when the line opened until December 31, 2016.)	5,830	1,399,153
2017	2,072,367	5,645	3,459,480
2018	2,114,717	5,794	5,574,366
2019	2,228,942	6,107	7,808,818
2020	782,556	2,148	8,601,264
2021	1,061,105	2,910	9,662,369
2022	1,534,897	4,205	11,197,266
2023	1,832,215	5,020	13,029,481
2024	1,856,129	4,393	14,885,610
2025	2,155,081	5,908	17,040,691

== Rolling stock ==
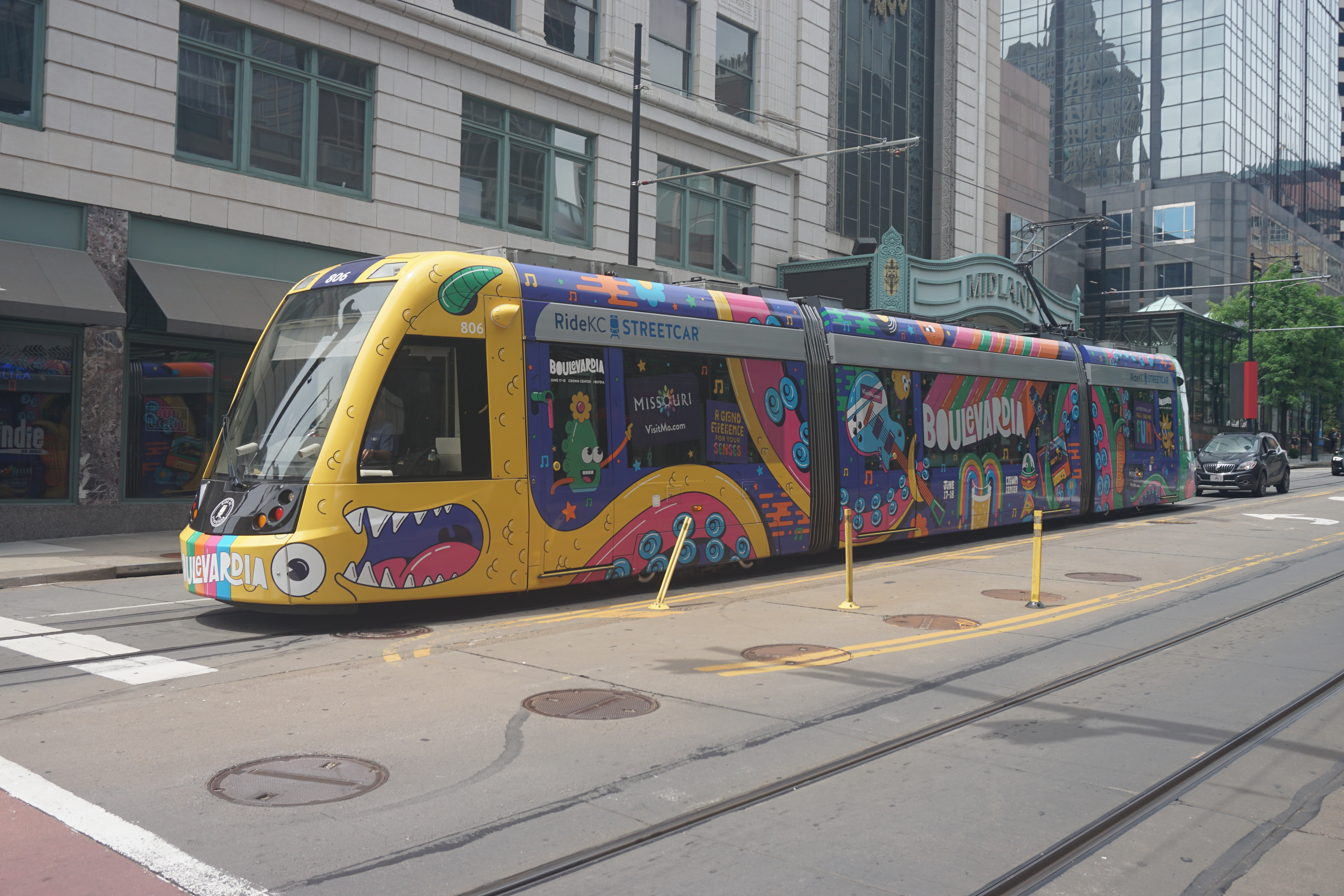
A streetcar decorated with an art wrap in June 2022

In October 2013, the mayor announced that the system will use 100% low-floor Urbos 3 streetcars made by the American subsidiary of Construcciones y Auxiliar de Ferrocarriles (CAF) in Elmira Heights, New York. The streetcars are numbered following the order set up by the original Kansas City Public Service Company numbering system.

The first streetcar (801) arrived in Kansas City on November 2, 2015, with testing beginning on November 6. Following initial high ridership, two additional streetcars were ordered from CAF in June 2017 at a cost of $12 million. Car 805 arrived on May 13, 2019, and entered service on July 1, 2019. Car 806 arrived on August 26, 2019.

As part of the expansion of the line south, 8 additional streetcars were ordered from CAF, doubling the size of the fleet to 14. The first of the expanded fleet (Car 807) arrived in February 2024, and began testing soon after. In December 2024, the last of the additional streetcars (Car 814) arrived in Kansas City. The additional streetcars have minor improvements including improved video surveillance and on-board passenger information.

== Future extensions ==
=== North to North Kansas City ===
In September 2021, the KC Streetcar Authority began studying the potential for a northern extension of the line over the Missouri River to North Kansas City. In January 2023, officials noted this would cost around $222 million to build, and that a TDD would not cover all its construction cost.

=== East–West lines ===
In October 2021, the KC Streetcar Authority and Kansas City Area Transportation Authority began planning an east–west transit line towards University of Kansas Medical Center and Kansas City, Kansas. Initial public consultation indicated that a streetcar line was preferred over bus rapid transit, and that a route along 39th Street and Linwood Boulevard was preferred. In November 2023, a proposed streetcar route was announced, a 5.6 mi (9.0 km) line from University of Kansas Medical Center to Van Brunt Boulevard using 39th Street and Linwood Boulevard, with 16 proposed stops. Officials noted that the line would cost between $560 million and $650 million to build, and that a TDD would not cover the cost of construction. Other funding sources such as federal grants and local, regional or state taxes would be considered as alternatives. It was noted that a TDD along the route may cover the estimated $8 million operating cost of the line.

In July 2025, the KC Streetcar Authority approved a study for another future line connecting the 18th and Vine District to the streetcar line.

== Operating authority ==
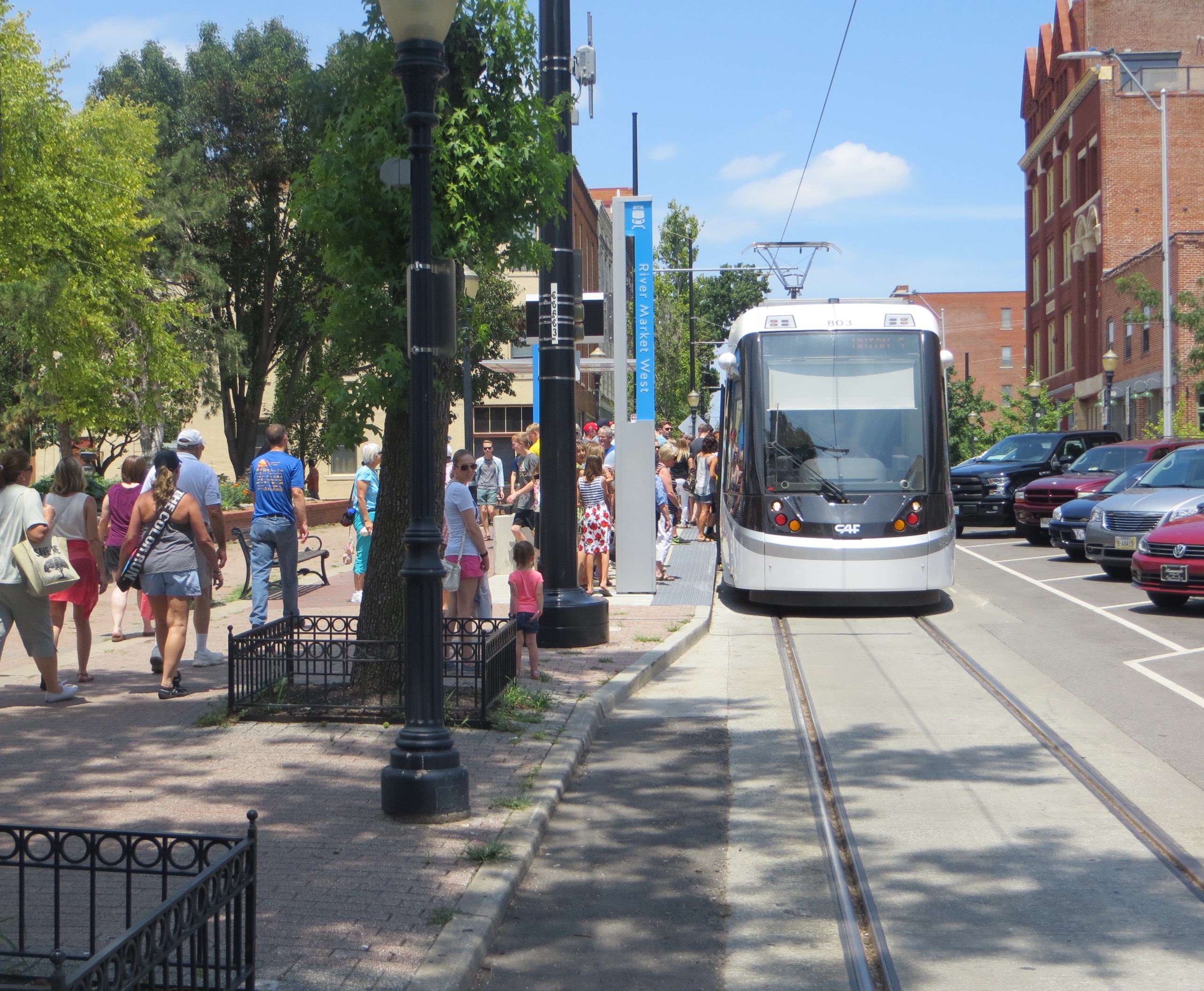
A streetcar stop in River Market

The streetcar is operated by the Kansas City Streetcar Authority, a not-for-profit corporation that is funded by local taxes. The authority was incorporated in August 2012 after voters approved creation of the Kansas City Downtown Transportation Development District, a special taxing district that funds construction and operation of a two-mile route through downtown Kansas City. Legal claims against the district and its taxation power were dismissed in August 2013. The streetcar began construction in May 2014, was completed in late 2015, and began carrying passengers in service on May 6, 2016.

The Streetcar Authority's 13 directors, a mix of public officials, business people, and transit advocates, were appointed by the City Council and Port Authority in late 2012 and met for the first time as an officially sanctioned body in early 2013. The authority's oversight of the streetcar's operation and maintenance is modeled on that of the Portland Streetcar. The city council has the power to appoint some of the authority's directors and retains ownership over the system.

Daily operations and maintenance of the system is handled by Herzog Transit Services, under joint contract to the Streetcar Authority and the City of Kansas City. The contract was signed in October 2015.

== Economic development ==
Even prior to the opening of the line in 2016, new development was occurring along the route. Analysis by HDR, Inc. stated that the downtown area along the route received $1.8 billion of development between 2013 and 2018, with a quarter of the investment publicly credited to the creation of the streetcar.

The streetcar has also been praised by political leaders and venue operators for making Kansas City more attractive for events, such as the 2021 Big 12 men's basketball tournament and the 2023 NFL draft.

In 2021, local businesses stated the extension of the line south to UMKC has also spurred development in the area, with $413 million of private investment. In 2023, it was reported that investors and developers had purchased over 150 properties along the extension route. Some residents have been concerned that development along the route will lead to gentrification.

== See also ==
- Light rail in the United States
- List of streetcar systems in the United States (historical)
- Streetcars in North America
