= Grand Boulevard (Kansas City, Missouri) =

Road in Missouri, U.S.

Grand Boulevard (formerly Grand Avenue)
- Interactive map of Grand Boulevard (formerly Grand Avenue)
- Coordinates: 39.09568°N 94.581179°W

Construction
- Construction start: 1820s

Grand Boulevard or Grand Avenue is a north–south street in Kansas City, Missouri, United States. Grand runs along the 200 east block in the Kansas City street grid system (two blocks east of Main Street). In the Downtown and Crown Center areas of Kansas City, it is an arterial route, continuing on the north as the Grand Avenue. Viaduct passing through Richard L. Berkley Riverfront Park and on the south intersecting with Main Street at about the 2800 south block.

== History ==
Grand Boulevard's first name was Peter Roy Road, after a French pioneer who first laid out its path in the 1820s. It was the first route that connected Westport Landing with Westport. It was known as Market Street for some time, but then retitled Grand Avenue once it was widened to 100 feet (30 m); it was meant to be wide enough for wagons to turn around on. The Grand Avenue name was chosen in the 1850s. A 1984 Kansas City Star article noted that plans to upgrade the street date back to the 1850s, and that "several plans for improving Downtown's widest and most important artery have drawn praise in recent years before dying in dusty file cabinets."

A plan to add it to the city's boulevard system was adopted in 1990, and Grand Boulevard signs were posted beginning in 1993. In 2007, the street was honorarily renamed Grand Boulevard of the Americas from 3rd Street to 22nd Street in honor of the Organization of American States.

In some areas of the city, streets running along the same gridline are known as Warwick Boulevard. Between 60th and 65th, Grand is called Morningside Lane. Then, it joins Rockhill to Gregory. South of 83rd street, Grand is not a through street but appears erratically as the name of various culs-de-sac.

The Downtown Council began a new effort to rejuvenate the road in 2025.

== Places ==
- Richard L. Berkley Riverfront Park is near its starting point.
- KC Streetcar starting point is located at 3rd & Grand. RideKC transit center is across the street.
- River Market is located at 3rd & Grand.
- Arabia Steamboat Museum is located at 400 Grand.
- City Market is located at 5th & Grand.
- UMB Bank headquarters is located at 1010 Grand. A branch is at 1010 Grand and 1800 Grand with ATMs seen every couple blocks or miles.
- It passes from 12th Street to I-670 on Grand by the Power & Light District.
- The College Basketball Experience is located at 1301 Grand and connected to the Sprint Center at 1407 Grand.
- United Methodist Church of the Resurrection Downtown campus is located at 1601 Grand.
- The Kansas City Star historic headquarters building is located at 1729 Grand.
- Crown Center is located at 2450 Grand near its ending point.
- Hallmark Crown Center and Halls Crown Center are tenants in Crown Center. Hallmark Visitors Center is at 2450 Grand in Crown Center.
- Legoland Discovery Center Kansas City connected to SEA LIFE Kansas City is located at 2475 Grand.
- Shook, Hardy & Bacon headquarters is at 2555 Grand.
- Grand Boulevard is used by majority of the Kansas City Area Transportation Authority | RideKC bus routes.
- Intersects with U.S. Route 71, U.S. Route 40, I-70, I-670, I-35, and US 24.
