= Crown Center =

Neighborhood and shopping center of Kansas City, Missouri

Coordinates: 39.080995°N 94.581442°W

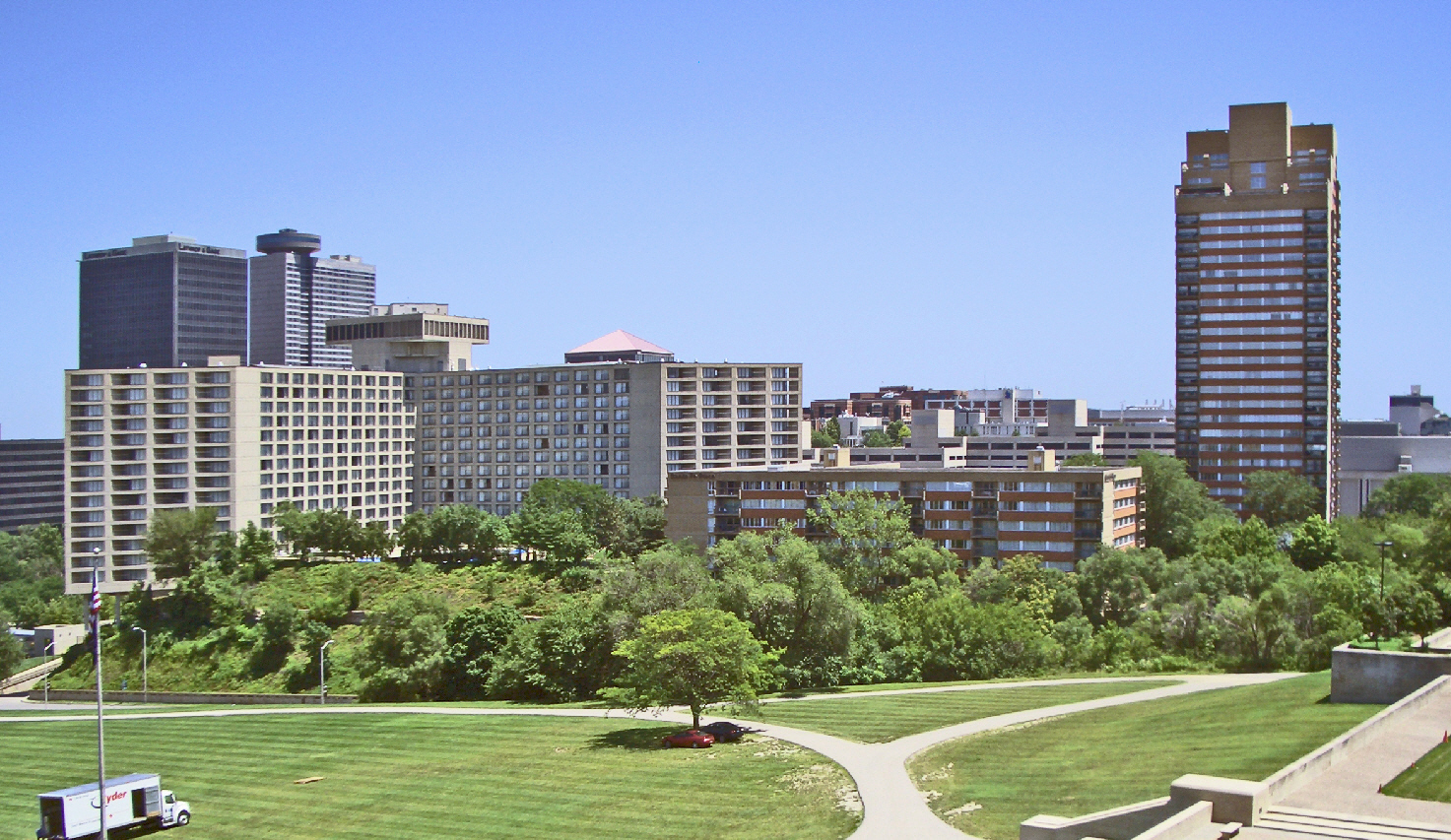
- Interactive map of Crown Center
- Location: 2450 Grand Boulevard; Kansas City, MO 64108
- Owner: Hallmark Cards
- Operator: Hallmark Cards
- Capacity: 85-acre (340,000 m^{2}) commercial complex

Construction
- Opened: 1971; 55 years ago
- Architect: Edward Larrabee Barnes (master)

Tenant
- Halls Crown Center Hallmark Crown Center Coterie Theatre

Crown Center is a shopping center and neighborhood located near Downtown Kansas City, Missouri between Gillham Road and Main Street to the east and west, and between OK/E 22nd St and E 27th St to the north and south. The shopping center is anchored by Halls, a department store which is owned and operated by Hallmark Cards. The neighborhood contains numerous residences, retail establishments, entertainment venues, and restaurants including the American Restaurant, the only Forbes Travel Guide four-star restaurant in Missouri. It is home to Hallmark Cards, and the headquarters of Shook, Hardy & Bacon and Lathrop GPM, two of Kansas City's largest law firms.

== History ==
Before the First World War, Downtown Kansas City was heavily populated and bustling. The area today home to Crown Center was an extension of the Union Hill historic neighborhood. Gradually, however, the center of population for the metro area moved south, and by the Second World War the area today comprising Crown Center had become dilapidated. Although Hallmark had maintained its headquarters at 26th Street and Grand Boulevard since 1922, the headquarters itself and nearby Union Station comprised the only non-slum in the area. Instead there were old warehouses, used car lots, and vacant buildings.

In 1966, Donald J. Hall, Sr. became President and CEO of Hallmark Cards, taking over from his father, Joyce Hall. Joyce Hall had long wished to develop the area around the corporate headquarters, and with his new leadership Donald Hall quickly made it known that he wished to renew the area entirely. Hallmark quietly began acquiring all the property surrounding its headquarters, and consulted with urban planning experts about the possibility of creating an experimental "city within a city" on the property. The City of Kansas City formally approved the plans for Crown Center (named after the Hallmark corporate symbol) by the end of 1967. The master design was prepared by Edward Larrabee Barnes.

Ground was broken for the complex in September 1968. Construction of the hotel, designed by Harry Weese in the Brutalist style, began in 1971. It opened in May 1973 as the Crown Center Hotel, managed by Western International Hotels. Signboard Hill is included in the hotel's design as a waterfall. Norman Fletcher designed the first residences. Henry Cobb of the I.M. Pei firm designed 2600 Grand office and Dan Kiley laid out the park in the south area of the complex. Warren Plattner, designer of Windows on the World, designed the interior space at the American Restaurant when it was operated by Joseph Baum (who also operated The Four Seasons and the Rainbow Room). In 2016, the restaurant announced plans to close and to become primarily a special event venue. The original concept for the shops was an international bazaar, part of which was a maze-like area known as West Village. Designed by architects François Dallegret and Joseph Baker, West Village proved unsuccessful and was replaced by a more conventional layout. Western International Hotels was rebranded as Westin Hotels in 1981, and the hotel was renamed The Westin Crown Center soon after.

In addition to the Westin, the Crown Center complex includes the Sheraton Kansas City Hotel at Crown Center, opened July 1, 1980 as the Hyatt Regency Kansas City. The roof had collapsed during construction, and then the hotel suffered the walkway collapse on July 17, 1981, killing 114 people in the deadliest non‑deliberate structural failure in American history. Because of the Barnes' firm's relationship to the developers, he was tapped to redesign the lobby of the hotel.

== Location specifics ==
Today, the shopping and entertainment complex features three levels of shops and restaurants, a set of grand open air fountains, live theaters, an ice skating rink and over-street walkways leading throughout the complex and to Kansas City's Union Station. The Halls department store was designed by Paul László. The complex includes the 45-story Sheraton Kansas City Hotel at Crown Center (which was Missouri's tallest building when built), a Westin hotel, and two upscale residential apartment skyscrapers. Kansas City's three largest law firms maintain their headquarters in other skyscrapers in the neighborhood. The neighborhood's grounds include parks, fountains, green spaces, and unique sculptures.

The global headquarters campus for Hallmark Cards is located on the eastern side of Crown Center. The new ballpark for the Kansas City Royals of Major League Baseball (MLB) is planned to be built on the site, under a partnership with the Royals and Hallmark.

=== Mayor's Christmas Tree ===
A century-old tradition, the Mayor's Christmas tree at Hallmark Cards’ Crown Center is strung with more than 7,200 white lights during the winter holidays and stands 100 feet tall, which is taller than the famous National Christmas Tree and Rockefeller Center Christmas Tree, and the White House Christmas Tree. A special guest or celebrity "flips the switch" each year. For example, in 2010 Chef Celina Tio (owner and chef of Julian in K.C., Missouri) on Food Network's The Next Iron Chef, joined Kansas City's Mayor Mark Funkhouser to light the tree. The lighting ceremony is held the day after Thanksgiving and the annual Country Club Plaza Lighting Ceremony. After the holidays, the tree is cut into commemorative ornaments and sold to benefit the Mayor's Christmas Tree Fund, which assists city residents in poverty.

== Gallery ==
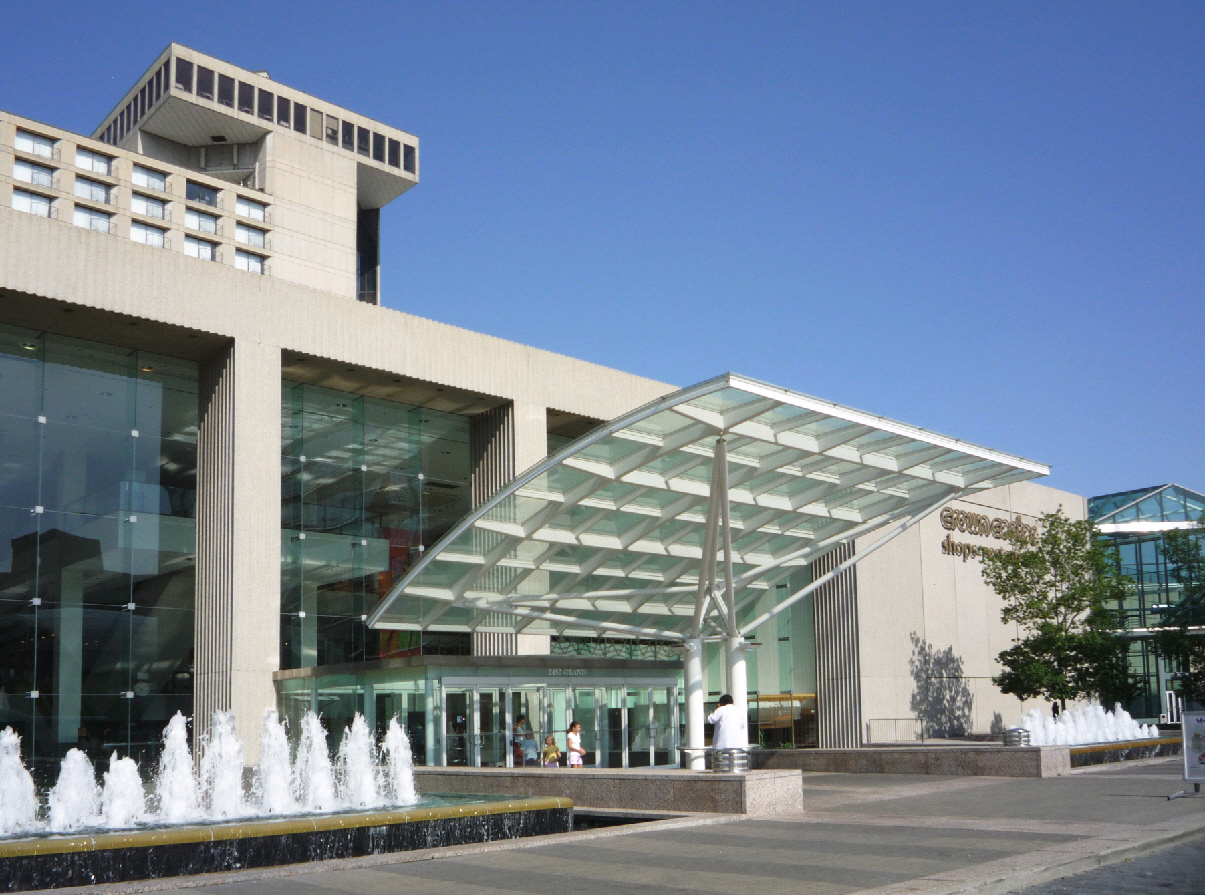
Entrance to shopping and entertainment complex.

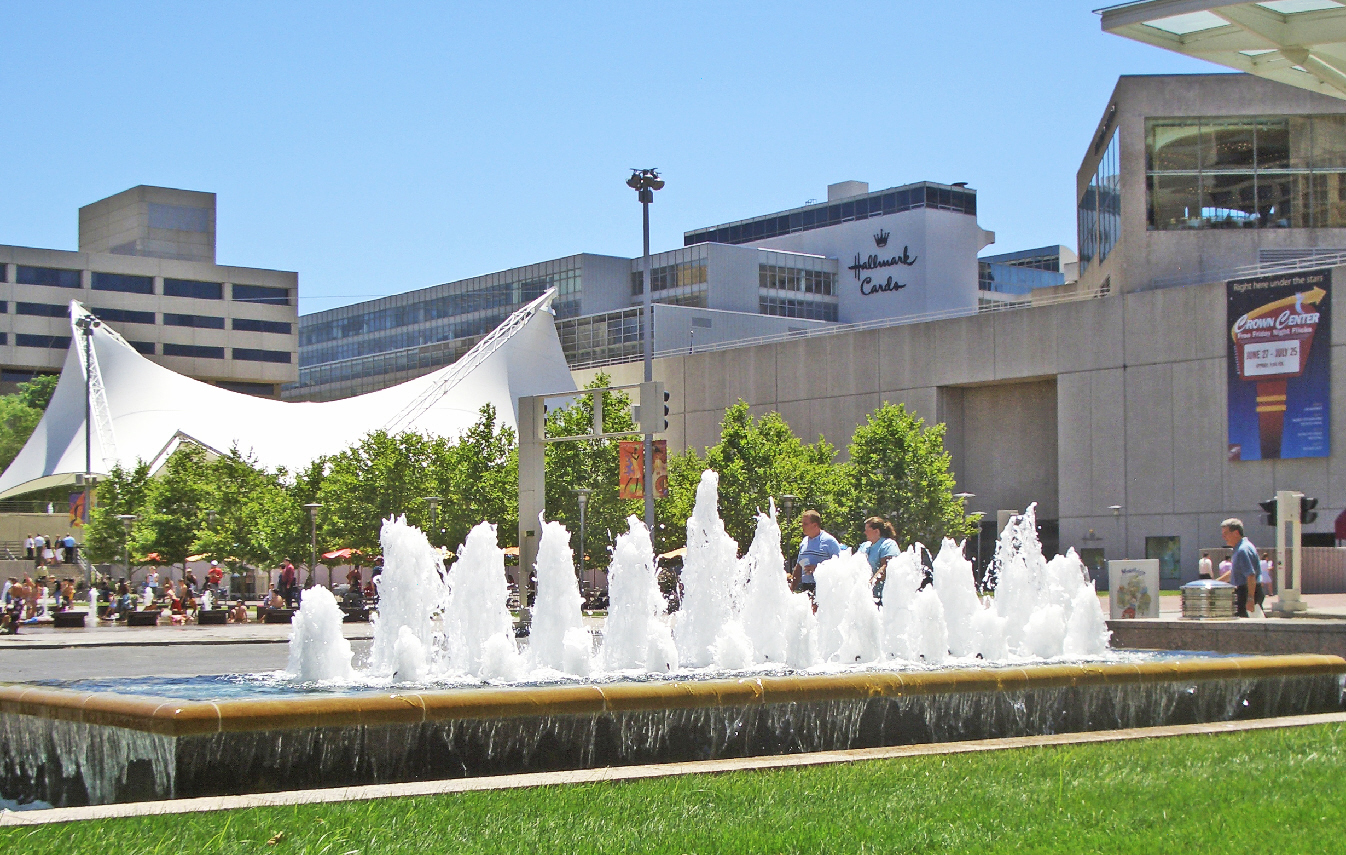
Square and fountains at the heart of Crown Center.

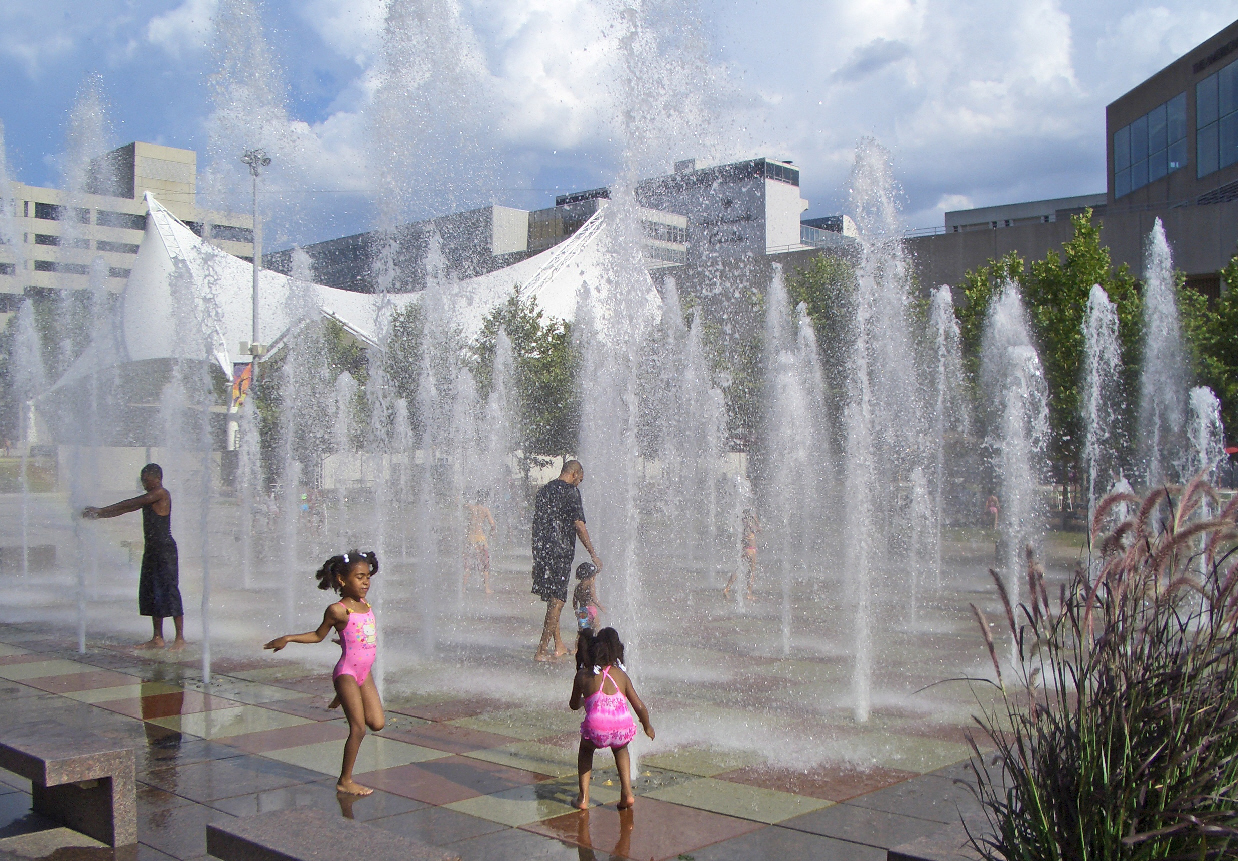
Crown Center Square fountains.

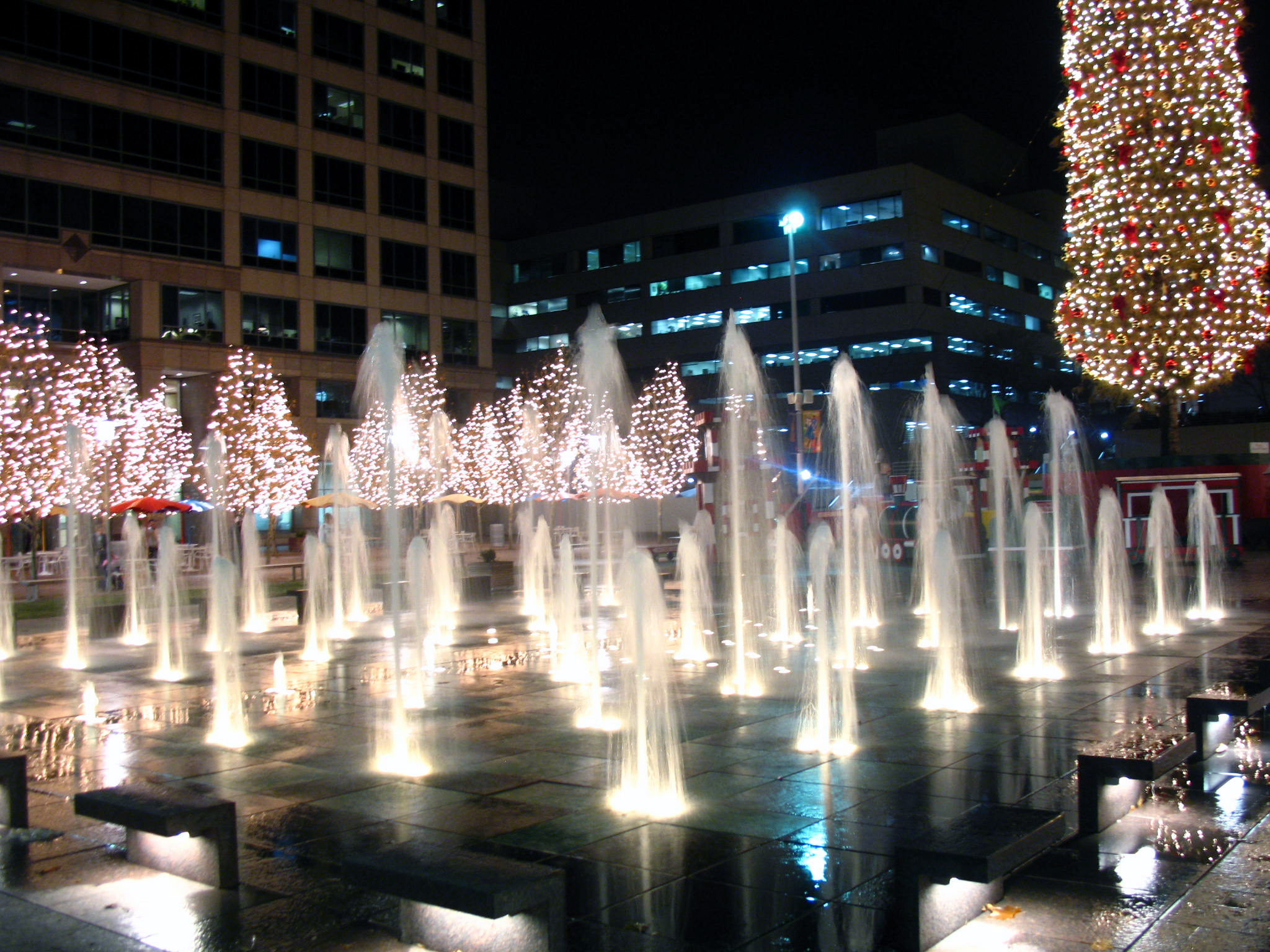
Crown Center fountains showing the Mayor's Christmas Tree during the holiday season.

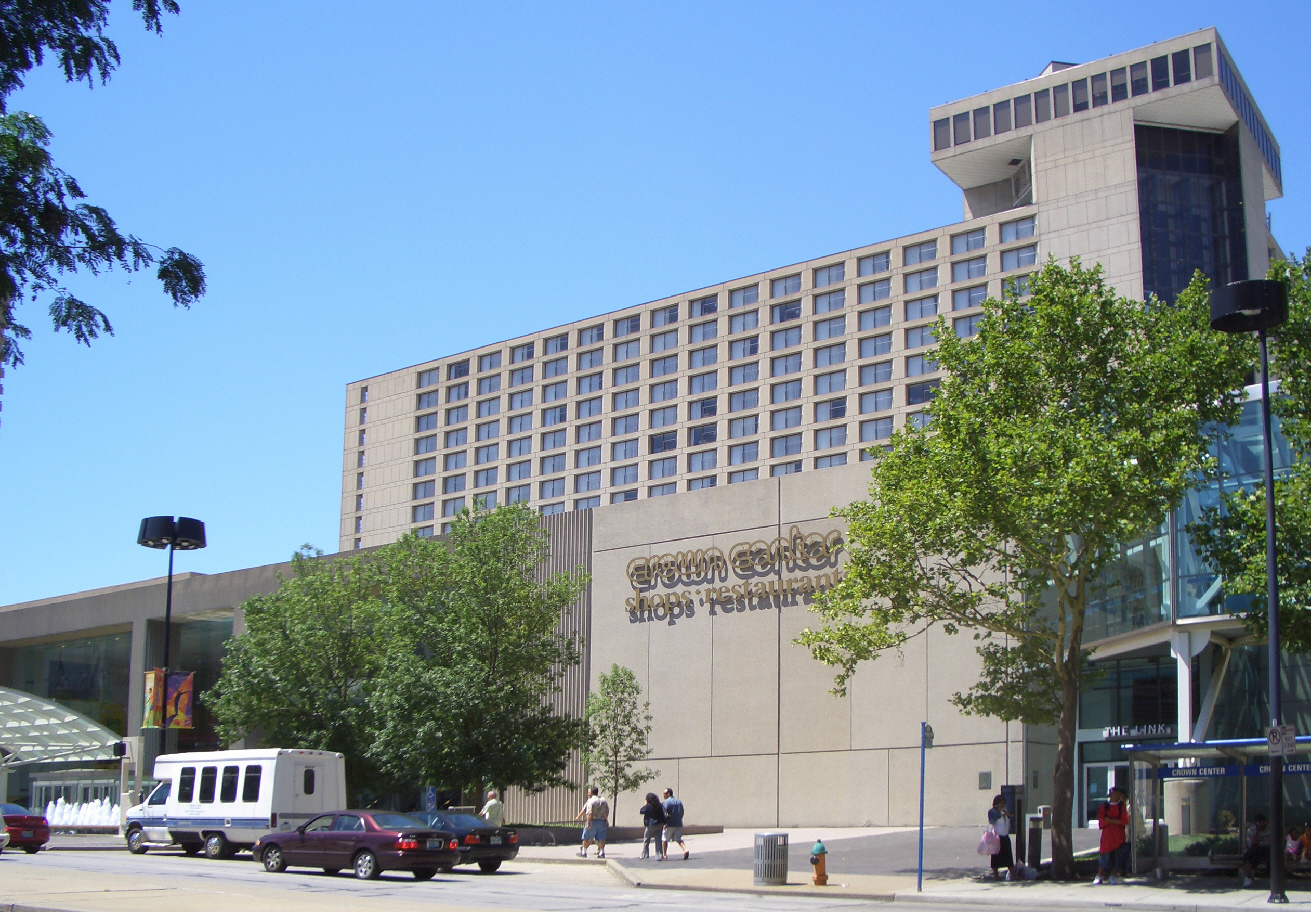
Mall entrance and
Westin Hotel.

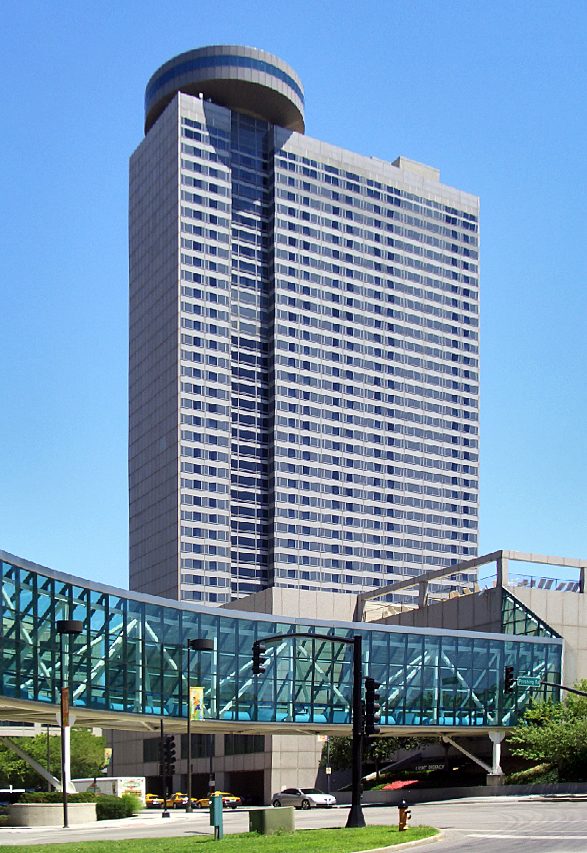
Sheraton Kansas City Hotel at Crown Center and walkway.

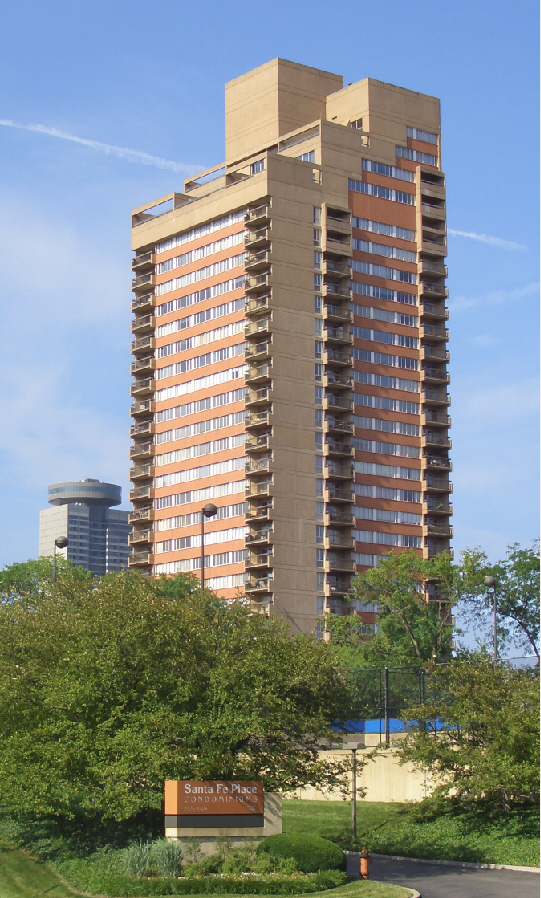
San Francisco Tower residential highrise.

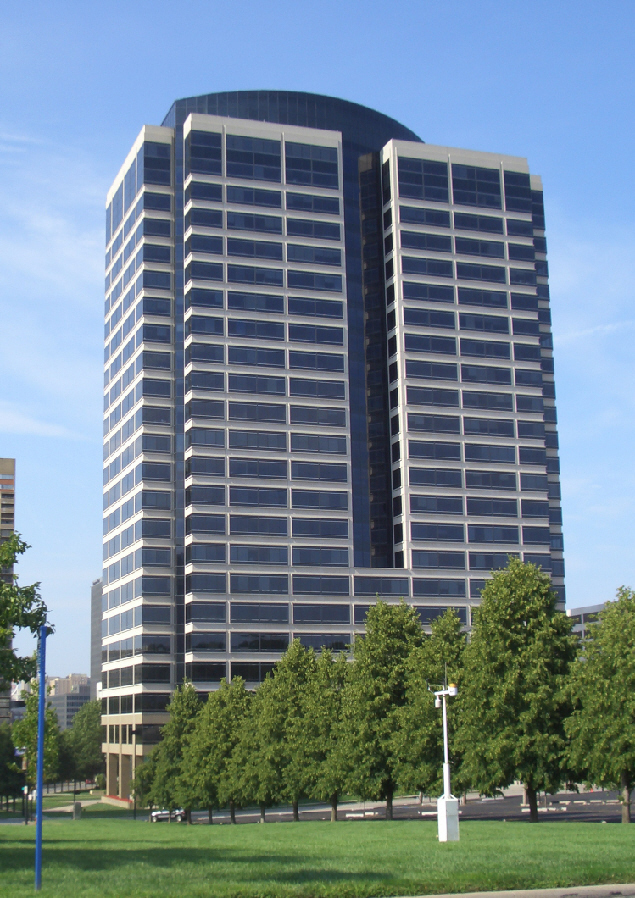
2555 Grand
office building (headquarters of Shook, Hardy & Bacon).

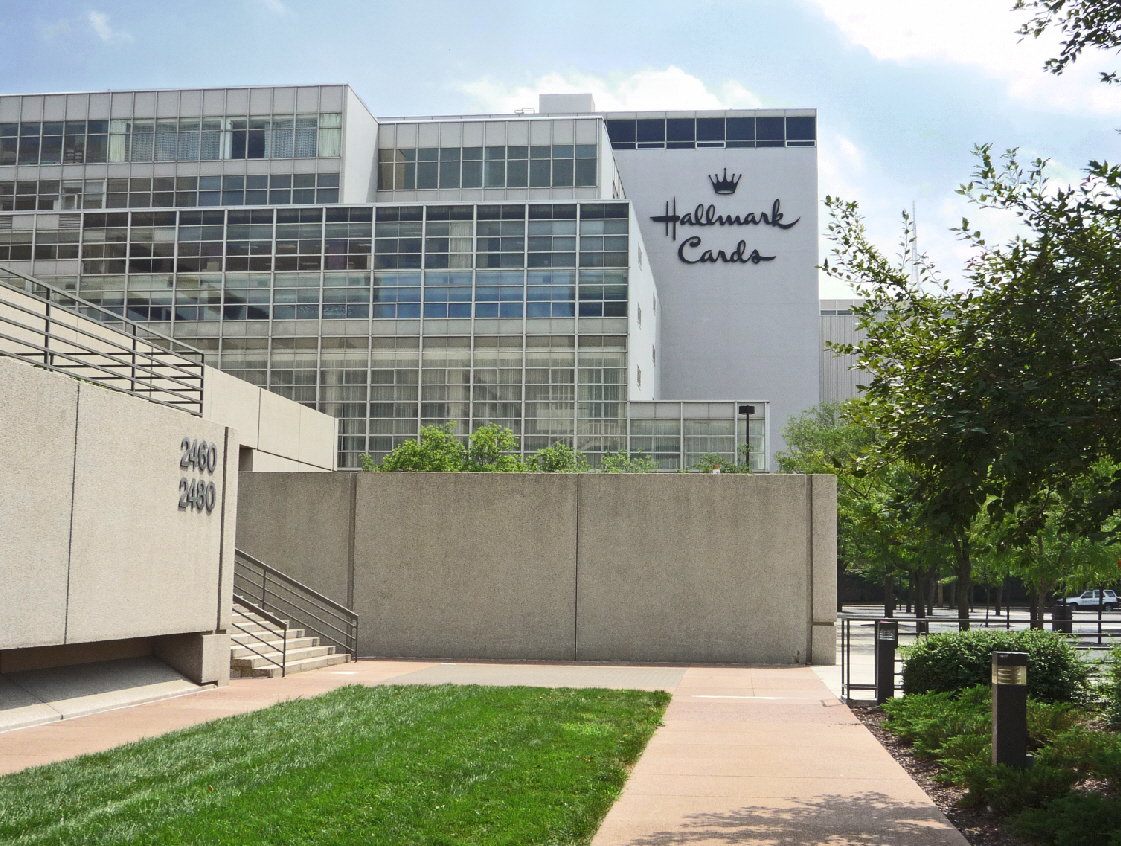
Hallmark Cards corporate offices.

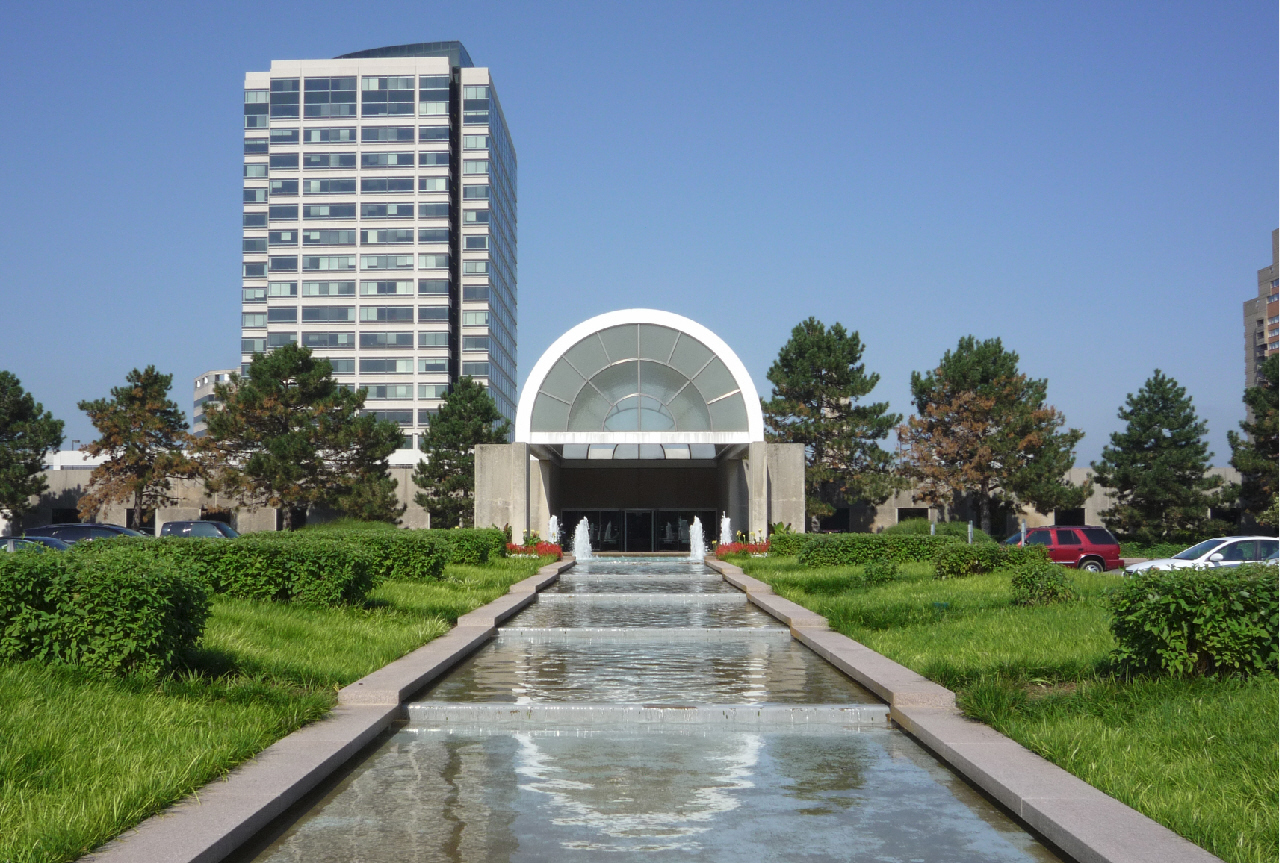
Hallmark corporate headquarters entrance.

== See also ==
- List of neighborhoods in Kansas City, Missouri
