= CFFN =

CFFN may refer to:

- Capitol Federal Savings Bank, trading as CFFN in Nasdaq
- Committee for Freedom Now, an American civil rights organization
- Coven of the Far Flung Net, part of the Universal Eclectic Wicca
