= Donald J. Hall Jr. =

American businessman

- Father: Donald J. Hall Sr.
- Relatives: Joyce Hall (grandfather)

Donald Joyce Hall Jr., is the executive chairman of Hallmark Cards.

== Early life ==
Donald J. Hall Jr. is the son of Adele (née Coryell) and Donald J. Hall Sr. He is the grandson of Joyce Hall. Both his father and grandfather were chief executives of Hallmark Cards. Hall earned a bachelor’s degree in economics and literature from Claremont McKenna College, Claremont, Calif., and an MBA from the University of Kansas, Lawrence, KS.

== Career ==
Hall joined Hallmark Cards in 1971 and worked in manufacturing, customer service, product development and sales. In 1990, Hall became a member of the board of directors. In 1993, Hall became general manager of Hallmark Keepsake Ornaments, the Christmas ornament brand. In 1995, he became vice president of creative. In 1997, Hall became vice president of product development and in 1999 he became executive vice president of strategy and development. In January 2002, following the retirement of Irvine O. Hockaday Jr., Hall became president and CEO. In 2015, his brother, David E. Hall became president. In 2019, Hall assumed the role of executive chairman of the board of directors.

Hall also serves on the board of directors of Hallmark Media and Hallmark International.

== Personal life ==
Don Hall, Jr. was named 2016 Kansas Citian of the Year by the Greater Kansas City Chamber of Commerce. Hall is active in the Kansas City community as a member of the Nelson-Atkins Museum of Art Board of Trustees, MRIGlobal Board of Trustees, University of Kansas School of Business Board of Advisors and the Kansas City Civic Council. Hall is married.
