= University of Kansas School of Business =

Public business school

Coordinates: 38°57′20″N 95°14′59″W

- Type: Public
- Established: 1924
- Parent institution: University of Kansas
- Dean: Jide Wintoki
- Academic staff: 130+
- Students: 4,600+
- Location: Lawrence, Kansas, U.S.
- Colors: Crimson and blue
- Website: business.ku.edu

The University of Kansas School of Business is a public business school on the main campus of the University of Kansas in Lawrence, Kansas. The KU School of Business was founded in 1924 and has more than 130 faculty members and approximately 4,600 students. The school and its accounting program hold accreditation from the Association to Advance Collegiate Schools of Business (AACSB).

== Academic areas ==
- Accounting
- Analytics, Information, Operations
- Finance
- Management and Entrepreneurship
- Marketing and Business Law

== History ==
Established in July of 1924, the KU School of Business commemorated its centennial during the 2024–25 academic year.

Upon its establishment, the school was administratively combined with the Department of Economics and Commerce and was located in Strong Hall. Less than a year after its founding, the school was admitted to membership in the American Association of Collegiate Schools of Business, today the AACSB.

In 1959, the business school moved into Summerfield Hall. After more than five decades in the building, KU recognized the need for a new facility that could accommodate the business school’s growth. The Capitol Federal Foundation of Topeka, Kansas, made a $20 million lead gift toward construction of the building in October 2012. In May 2016, the School of Business moved into its current state-of-the-art home, Capitol Federal Hall.

In September 2023, the business school received the largest gift in its history: a $50 million commitment from an anonymous donor. The gift supports KU Business education and research key initiatives.

In June 2025, the school received an additional $10 million gift commitment from the anonymous donor ensuring the construction of an entrepreneurship hub building that to foster entrepreneurship and innovation and serve all KU students, regardless of their field of study.

== Academic programs ==
The KU School of Business offers undergraduate, master's, and doctoral programs across disciplines.

=== Undergraduate ===
Bachelor of Science in Business programs are offered in eight majors and one-co-major with options for minors and certificates.

==== BSB majors ====
- Accounting
- Business Administration
- Business Analytics
- Finance
- Information Systems
- International Business (co-major)
- Management and Leadership
- Marketing
- Supply Chain Management

The school also offers an online Bachelor of Business Administration.

=== Master's degrees ===
KU Business graduate degree programs offered on the Lawrence campus:

- Full-time Master of Business Administration (MBA)
  - Dual MBA programs, including an MBA/M.S. in Business Analytics
- Master of Science in Business Analytics
- Master of Accounting

The school also offers master's degree programs for military officers at Leavenworth:

- Master of Science in Organizational Leadership
- Master of Science in Supply Chain Management

KU's online MBA program ranked among the top 10 in the nation by U.S. News and World Report's Best Online MBA Programs in 2025.

=== Doctoral ===
The small Ph.D. program admits new students each year who work closely with faculty. Students can specialize in the following concentrations: Accounting, Information Systems, Finance, Marketing, Business Analytics, Human Resources Management, Organizational Behavior, Operations Research, and Strategic Management.

== Deans ==
- Frank Stockton, 1924–47
- Leonard Axe, 1947–57
- James Surface, 1957–62
- Joseph McGuire, 1963–68
- Clifford Clark, 1968–73
- Joseph Pichler, 1974–80
- John Tollefson, 1981–90
- L. Joseph Bauman, 1990–95
- Tom Sarowski, 1995–2000
- William Fuerst, 2000–11
- Neeli Bendapudi, 2011–16
- L. Paige Fields, 2017–24
- Jide Wintoki, 2025–present

== Location ==
The KU School of Business is located in Capitol Federal Hall, which is on the south side of the campus, across from Hoglund Ball Park and Allen Fieldhouse.

== Notable alumni ==
- Tim Barton (B.S.B., 1989), Investor and Co-Founder, Former Chairman of Freightquote
- David G. Booth (M.S. in Business, 1969), Chairman of Dimensional Fund Advisors
- Roger Davis (B.S.B, 1972) , Former CEO of Paxton/Patterson in Chicago
- John B. Dicus (B.S.B., 1983; MBA, 1984), CEO of Capitol Federal
- John C. Dicus (B.S.B., 1955), Former Chairman, President and CEO of Capitol Federal
- Jill Docking (MBA, 1983), Senior Vice President of The Docking Group
- Donald J. Hall (MBA, 1983), Executive Chairman of the Board of Hallmark Cards
- Cliff Illig (B.S.B., 1973), Cerner Co-Founder
- Mike Michaelis (B.S.B., 1968; MBA, 1969), Chairman of Emprise Bank
- Roshann Parris (MBA, 1986), Founder and CEO of Parris Communications
- Juan Manuel Santos (B.S.B., 1973), Former President of Colombia, 2016 Nobel Peace Prize Recipient
