= Henry Bubb =

American businessman (1907–1989)

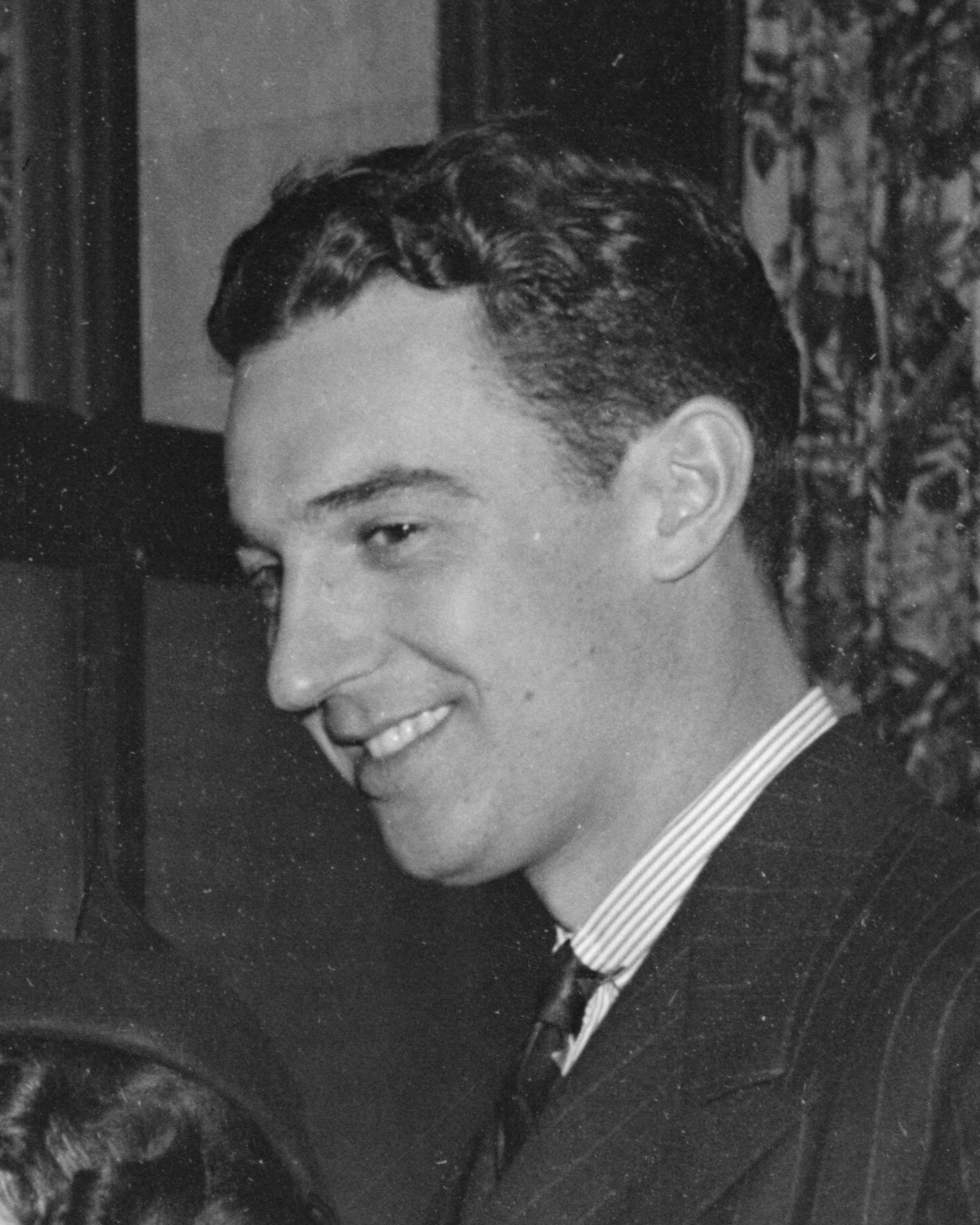
- Bubb in September 1937
- Born: March 26, 1907; Williamsport, Pennsylvania, U.S.
- Died: January 10, 1989 (aged 81); Topeka, Kansas, U.S.
- Education: University of Kansas
- Occupation: Businessman
- Employer: Capitol Federal Savings Bank
- Spouses: Rose Hardwick (m. 1928); Elizabeth B. (died 1986)

Henry Agnew Bubb (March 26, 1907 – January 10, 1989) was an American businessman. He worked as president and chairman of the board of Capitol Federal Savings Bank from 1941 to 1969.

== Early life and education ==
Henry Bubb was born on March 26, 1907, in Williamsport, Pennsylvania. At some point, he lived in Gallatin County, Montana, and he later moved to Topeka, Kansas. He attended the University of Kansas and received an honorary degree from Washburn University.

== Career ==
Bubb was hired in 1926 as a clerk at Capitol Building and Loan Association, which would eventually become Capitol Federal Savings Bank. In 1941, he was named president and chairman of the board of the association and served until 1969. Bubb received a Distinguished Service Citation from the U.S. Treasury Department in recognition of his efforts in the sale of War Bonds for World War II. While serving as president, the assets of Capitol Federal Savings Bank increased from $4 MM to $175 MM. Bubb's son-in-law, John C. Dicus, took over as president in 1969, and Bubb continued to work as chairman and chief executive officer.

Bubb was the president of the United States Savings and Loan League from 1949 to 1950, the president of the Topeka Chamber of Commerce and the University of Kansas (KU) Alumni Association. He served as chairman of the Mortgage Guaranty Insurance Corporation and the Federal Home Loan Bank of Topeka. He was the director of the Merchants' National Bank, the Security Benefit Life Insurance Company, and the Columbian Title & Trust Company.

He was a member of advisory committees to the United States Senate and the United States Department of the Treasury, the Kansas Board of Regents (1961–1977, including as the board chairman), the KU Athletic Board, and the Washburn University Board of Regents.

== Personal life ==
Bubb married Rose Hardwick on August 24, 1928, in Colorado Springs, Colorado. He was remarried to an Elizabeth before 1940 and she died in 1986.

== Death and legacy ==
Bubb died on January 10, 1989, at the age of 81, in Topeka, Kansas. He was inducted into the Kansas Business Hall of Fame in 1993.
