= Halls (department store) =

Luxury department store in Kansas City

Coordinates: 39.0828°N 94.5825°W

- Company type: subsidiary
- Industry: retail
- Genre: department store
- Founded: 1916
- Founder: Joyce C. Hall
- Headquarters: Kansas City, Missouri, U.S.
- Number of locations: 1 (2 locations for some decades)
- Products: apparel, cosmetics, jewelry, shoes, china, crystal, silver, housewares, greeting cards
- Services: bridal registry corporate gift services and custom tailoring
- Parent: Hallmark Cards
- Website: Official website

Halls is a department store located in the Crown Center commercial complex district in downtown Kansas City, Missouri, United States.

A division of Kansas City, Missouri–based Hallmark Cards, the specialty department store carries a variety of premium-branded items in apparel, cosmetics, jewelry, shoes, and other product categories, in addition to greeting cards and gift items carrying the Hallmark brand. Halls is positioned at a price level comparable to larger luxury-oriented chains, including Bloomingdale's and Neiman Marcus.

== History ==
Hallmark founder Joyce C. Hall founded Halls in 1916, as a companion to his greeting-card company which had begun three years earlier. The store evolved from a showcase in the lobby of downtown Kansas City's Gordon and Koppel Building. By 1916, Halls had moved its store to 11th Street along the city's fashionable "Petticoat Lane" with expanded offerings covering an array of high-quality gift items. Halls' move in 1950 to downtown's Grand Avenue further developed its local reputation as a premium specialty store, with more merchandise added.

Halls became part of the collection of stores at the city's Country Club Plaza in 1965, with a 55,000-square-foot store comprising a full city block in the shopping district. In addition to the store's merchandise selection, the structure was outfitted with elaborate building materials and accessories such as inlaid lapis lazuli floors and Baccarat crystal chandeliers, with details complementary to the district's overall Spanish and Moorish architectural styles.

The department store's location in Crown Center was conceived in 1973. It was part of the continued revitalization of downtown envisioned by J. C. Hall, associated with development surrounding Hallmark's corporate headquarters that had begun in earnest in 1967. Halls Crown Center replaced the original downtown Halls with a three-level, 100,000-square-foot (9,300 m^{2}) store designed by Paul László.

In 2011, both the first and second floor of Halls Crown Center were converted to an aquarium from Sea Life Centres and a Legoland Discovery Centre in a combined $30 million project. The displaced men's department and Hallmark Cards location were relocated to the Crown Center Shops while the women's department stayed in its original third-floor location.

The division in the present day notes J. C. Hall's mission for the store as a "unique shopping experience dedicated to the expression of personal style and the art of living well."

In June 2013, Halls announced plans to consolidate its two stores into a new, larger store in Crown Center. Halls president Kelly Cole said that it no longer made sense to operate two stores so close to one another. The existing Crown Center store closed in March 2014, and the Plaza store closed August 3, 2014. The new 60,000-square-foot (5,600 m^{2}) Crown Center store, opened on September 21, 2014, it includes all current Halls departments and a café. As a result of the consolidation, Halls was projected to eventually cut around 115 staff positions.

The consolidated store continued to operate relatively unchanged until October 2020, when Halls announced that it would remodel and downsize its space in early 2021. In total, around 12,000 square feet would be closed off from the prior store footprint. The entire home-goods and cosmetics departments were eliminated in this downsizing and the jewelry department was shrunk significantly. Additionally, the H Bar cafe space was shuttered. Halls cited changing customer preference as the primary reason for the eliminations. During the remodel, Halls temporarily relocated to the remaining prior Crown Center Halls space on the third floor, above the Legoland Discovery Center and Sea Life Aquarium. The re-sized store opened in March 2021.

== Products and services ==
Halls offers a variety of premium brands in ladies' and men's apparel, cosmetics, jewelry, and housewares, with select items available exclusively at the stores. Bridal registry, corporate-gift services, and custom tailoring are also offered, along with an in-store Hallmark Gold Crown shop. The store is also a long-time sponsor of several area humanitarian organizations, serving health care, fine arts, public broadcasting and other interests around greater Kansas City.

== See also ==
- List of department stores of the United States
