= List of department stores of the United States =

This is a list of department stores of the United States currently operating.

== Department stores ==
=== National department stores ===
- JCPenney (nationwide, since 1902)
- Kohl's (nationwide, since 1962)
- Macy's, Inc.
  - Bloomingdale's (nationwide, since 1861)
  - Macy's (nationwide, since 1858)
- Nordstrom
  - Nordstrom (nationwide, since 1901)
  - Nordstrom Rack (nationwide, since 1973)
- Saks Global
  - Bergdorf Goodman (New York City, since 1899)
  - Neiman Marcus (nationwide, since 1907)
  - Saks Fifth Avenue (nationwide, since 1867)
  - Saks Off 5th (nationwide, since 1990)
- Transformco
  - Kmart (Miami, Guam, and the U.S. Virgin Islands, since 1962)
  - Sears (nationwide, since 1892)

=== Regional department stores ===
- Belk, 239 stores, (Alabama, Arkansas, Florida, Georgia, Kentucky, Louisiana, Maryland, Mississippi, Missouri, North Carolina, Oklahoma, South Carolina, Tennessee, Texas, Virginia, West Virginia; since 1888)
- Boscov's, 51 stores, (Connecticut, Delaware, Maryland, New Jersey, New York, Ohio, Pennsylvania, West Virginia, Rhode Island; since 1914)
- Dillard's, 285 stores, (Alabama, Arizona, Arkansas, California, Colorado, Florida, Georgia, Idaho, Illinois, Indiana, Iowa, Kansas, Kentucky, Louisiana, Mississippi, Missouri, Montana, Nebraska, Nevada, New Mexico, North Carolina, Ohio, Oklahoma, South Carolina, Tennessee, Texas, Utah, Virginia, Wyoming; since 1938)
- Von Maur, 38 stores, (Alabama, Georgia, Illinois, Indiana, Iowa, Kansas, Kentucky, Michigan, Minnesota, Missouri, Nebraska, New York, Ohio, Pennsylvania, Oklahoma, Wisconsin; since 1872)

=== Discount department stores ===
- Academy Sports + Outdoors
- Bealls
- Bi-Mart
- Big Lots
- BJ's Wholesale Club
- Burlington
- Costco
- Dick's Sporting Goods
- Dollar General
- Dollar Tree
- Family Dollar
- Five Below
- Gabe's
- Hobby Lobby
- Meijer
- Ocean State Job Lot
- Ollie's Bargain Outlet
- Renys
- Roses
- Ross Stores
- Sam's Club
- Shoppers World
- Target
- TJX
  - TJ Maxx
  - Marshalls
  - HomeGoods
  - Sierra
- Walmart

=== Independent department stores ===
- Century 21 (New York City, from 1961 to 2020 and since 2023)
- Gump's (San Francisco, from 1861 to 2018 and since 2019)
- Gus Mayer (Birmingham, Alabama and Nashville, since 1900)
- Halls (Kansas City, since 1916)
- Loeb's (Meridian, since 1887)
- Loehmann's (pop-up locations, from 1921 to 2014 and since 2025)
- Printemps (New York City, from 1987 to 1989 and since 2025)
- Stanley Korshak (Dallas, since 1909)

=== Defunct department stores now online ===
- Lord & Taylor
- Montgomery Ward
- The Bon-Ton
- Forever 21

== See also ==
- List of hypermarkets in the United States
- List of supermarket chains in the United States
- Retail apocalypse
