= Revilo =

Revilo is a given name, and is "Oliver" spelled backwards. Notable people with the name include:

- Revilo P. Oliver (1908–1994), American professor and polemicist
- Oliver Christianson, American cartoonist known by the pen name Revilo
