= J. C. Hall (businessman) =

American businessman (1891–1982)

- Born: Joyce Clyde Hall; August 29, 1891; David City, Nebraska, U.S.
- Died: October 29, 1982 (aged 91); Leawood, Kansas, U.S.
- Resting place: Forest Hill Calvary Cemetery; Kansas City, Missouri, U.S.
- Occupation: Businessman
- Years active: 1900–1966
- Known for: Founder of Hallmark Cards
- Spouse: Elizabeth Ann Dilday (m. 1922; died 1976)
- Children: 3, including Donald

Joyce Clyde Hall (August 29, 1891 – October 29, 1982), better known as J. C. Hall, was an American businessman and the founder of Hallmark Cards.

== Early life ==
Joyce Clyde Hall was born on August 29, 1891, in David City, Nebraska, to Nancy "Nannie" Dudley (née Houston) and George Nelson Hall, a traveling Methodist minister. He was their third son. Hall was named after Methodist bishop Isaac W. Joyce. In 1901, his mother filed for divorce and was granted custody of Hall and his siblings. When Hall was seven, his father died. By age eight Hall was selling door-to-door with the company that eventually became Avon Products. Hall's belief was that in the difficult economic straits of his widowed mother's family, he needed to add a postscript to his father's bible quote, "the Lord will provide"; it was, "It's a good idea to give the Lord a little help." In 1905, Hall and his brothers invested US$540 to buy picture postcards to sell to store owners and other dealers around their area. They also convinced some of the traveling salesmen who came into the Halls' bookstore, which Joyce Hall's older brothers bought with a partner in 1902, to add the postcards to their sales territories. Hall conceived the Norfolk Post Card Company in 1907 in Norfolk, Nebraska. Hall attended high school in Norfolk but did not graduate. He enrolled at Spalding's Commercial College, but did not continue.

== Career ==
After quitting high school in 1910, Hall moved to Kansas City, Missouri, with little more than two shoe boxes of postcards. By 1913, he and his brothers were operating a store (which would eventually evolve into Kansas City's Halls department store) selling not only postcards but also greeting cards. The store burned in 1915, and a year later, Hall bought an engraving business and began printing his own cards. It turned into a bigger business than he had had before. In 1928, he began marketing his cards under the Hallmark brand name.

Hall, who objected to the name Joyce and typically went by "J.C.", retired in 1966 and spent his retirement in efforts to revitalize the Kansas City downtown area. One of the results was Crown Center, a combination business/shopping district surrounding the Hallmark corporate headquarters. After his retirement, his son Donald J. Hall succeeded him as chief executive.

== Personal life ==
Hall married Elizabeth Ann Dilday, a friend of the family, in 1922. They had one son, Donald J. Hall, and two daughters. His wife died in 1976.

Hall died on October 29, 1982, at his home in Leawood, Kansas. At the time of his death, the fortune of Hall and his son was estimated at around US$400,000,000 (equivalent to about $1,334,000,000 in 2025). He was buried at Forest Hill Calvary Cemetery in Kansas City.

== Awards and legacy ==
Hall received an honorary diploma from David City High School in 1962.

== See also ==
- People to People Student Ambassador Program
