= Donald J. Hall Sr. =

American business executive (1928–2024)

- Born: July 9, 1928; Kansas City, Missouri, U.S.
- Died: October 13, 2024 (aged 96); Mission Hills, Kansas, U.S.
- Education: Dartmouth College (AB)
- Occupation: Businessman
- Title: Chairman and majority owner, Hallmark Cards
- Spouse: Adele Coryell (m. 1953; died 2013)
- Children: 3, including Donald J. Hall Jr.
- Father: Joyce Hall

Donald Joyce Hall (July 9, 1928 – October 13, 2024) was an American billionaire businessman from Kansas City, Missouri. He was chairman and president of Hallmark Cards, the world's largest greeting card manufacturer. In 2015, Forbes estimated his family's net worth to be $2.8 billion.

== Early life ==
Donald Joyce Hall was born on July 9, 1928, in Kansas City, Missouri, to Elizabeth Ann (née Dilday) and Joyce Hall. His father was the founder and president of Hallmark Cards. He graduated from Pembroke-Country Day School. In 1946, he worked as a sales trainee and later as an assistant salesman for Hallmark. Hall graduated from Dartmouth College in 1950 with a Bachelor of Arts in economics. He served in the United States Army from September 1950 to October 1953, spending time in Gifu, Japan. He attained the rank of first lieutenant.

== Career ==
Following his military service, Hall returned to Hallmark in 1953 and became assistant to the president in 1954. In 1956, he became a director. In March 1958, Hall was elected administrative vice president. On March 16, 1966, Hall's father, Joyce Hall, retired as president and Hall became president of Hallmark. In 1981, he oversaw the litigation from the Hyatt Regency walkway collapse, which cost the company more than $100 million. In 1983, he stepped down as president and became chairman of the board. Irvine O. Hockaday Jr. succeeded him as president. He served as chairman emeritus of Hallmark from 2016 to his death.

== Philanthropy ==
Hall was chair of the Hall Family Foundation. He was a founding member of the Kansas City Community Foundation. He helped start the Kansas City Area Economic Development Council. In 1972, he led the "Prime Time" campaign in Kansas City to market the city as "one of the few livable cities left". He was credited with locating the 1976 Republican National Convention to Kansas City. He served on the board of trustees of Nelson-Atkins Museum of Art for 31 years and in the 1960s helped establish the Hallmark Photographic Collection. In 2005, the collection was donated to the Nelson-Atkins museum. He was chairman of the board of MRIGlobal.

George H. W. Bush appointed Hall as chairman of the President's Committee on the Arts and Humanities. In 2005, he served on the boards of the Kansas City Symphony, the Kansas City Repertory Theatre, Lyric Opera of Kansas City and the Full Employment Council.

== Personal life and death ==
Hall married Adele Coryell, of Lincoln, Nebraska, on November 28, 1953. They had three children, Margaret Elizabeth, David Earl and Donald J. Hall Jr. His wife died in 2013. Hall lived in Mission Hills, Kansas. He was a member of St. Andrew's Episcopal Church. Hall died at home on October 13, 2024, at the age of 96.

== Awards and honors ==
- 1972: Kansas Citizen of the Year
- 1977: Parsons Award for "extraordinary contributions to the arts and culture" from the Parsons School of Design
- 1982: Governor's Award from the Academy of Television Arts & Sciences
- 1985: Awarded the National Medal of Arts by President Ronald Reagan
- 1985: Philanthropist of the Year Award from the Greater Kansas City Council on Philanthropy
- 1985: Award of excellence from the Kansas City Architectural Foundation and honorary membership in the American Institute of Architects
- 1992: Kansas Business Hall of Fame in 1992
- 1995: Golden Plate Award of the American Academy of Achievement
- 2000: Honorary Doctor of Laws degree from Dartmouth College

== Legacy ==
In 2013, the Nelson-Atkins Museum of Art established the Donald J. Hall Sculpture Park in his honor.

== See also ==
- List of billionaires
