= Hallmark Cards =

American company specializing in greeting cards and gifts

Hallmark Cards, Inc.
- Type: Private
- Industry: Retail, greeting card, gift shop
- Founded: 1907; 119 years ago (as Norfolk Post Card Company); 1908; 118 years ago (as Hall Brothers); 1954; 72 years ago (as Hallmark)
- Founder: Joyce Hall
- Headquarters: 2501 McGee Street, Kansas City, Missouri, U.S.
- Number of locations: 1,146 stores (2025)
- Area served: Worldwide
- Key people: Donald J. Hall Jr. (executive chairman); David E. Hall (executive vice chairman); Mike Perry (president & CEO)
- Products: Greeting cards; Gift wrap; Party goods; Giftware; Stationery; Electronic greetings; Keepsake ornaments; Media/entertainment
- Brands: Rainbow Brite; Shirt Tales; Hoops & Yoyo
- Revenue: ▲US$5.0 billion (2020)
- Owner: Hall family
- Number of employees: 30,000 (2020)
- Subsidiaries: Crayola; DaySpring Greeting Cards; Hallmark Business Connections; Hallmark Channel (Hallmark Media); Hallmark+; Hallmark eCards; Hallmark Ink and Main Press; Hallmark Gold Crown Stores; Halls; Sunrise Greetings; Hallmark Baby; Bernama TV (7%); Mahogany Greeting Cards
- Website: hallmark.com

Hallmark Cards, Inc. is a privately held, family-owned American company based in Kansas City, Missouri, United States. Founded in 1910 by Joyce Hall, Hallmark is one of the oldest and largest manufacturers of greeting cards in the United States. In 1985, the company was awarded the National Medal of Arts.

In addition to greeting cards, Hallmark also manufactures such products as party goods, gift wrap, and stationery. Hallmark acquired Binney & Smith in 1984, which later changed its name to Crayola, LLC after its well-known Crayola brand of crayons, markers and colored pencils. The company is also involved in television, having produced the long-running Hallmark Hall of Fame series since 1951, and launching the Hallmark Channel 50 years later (replacing an earlier joint venture with The Jim Henson Company, Odyssey Network).

== History ==
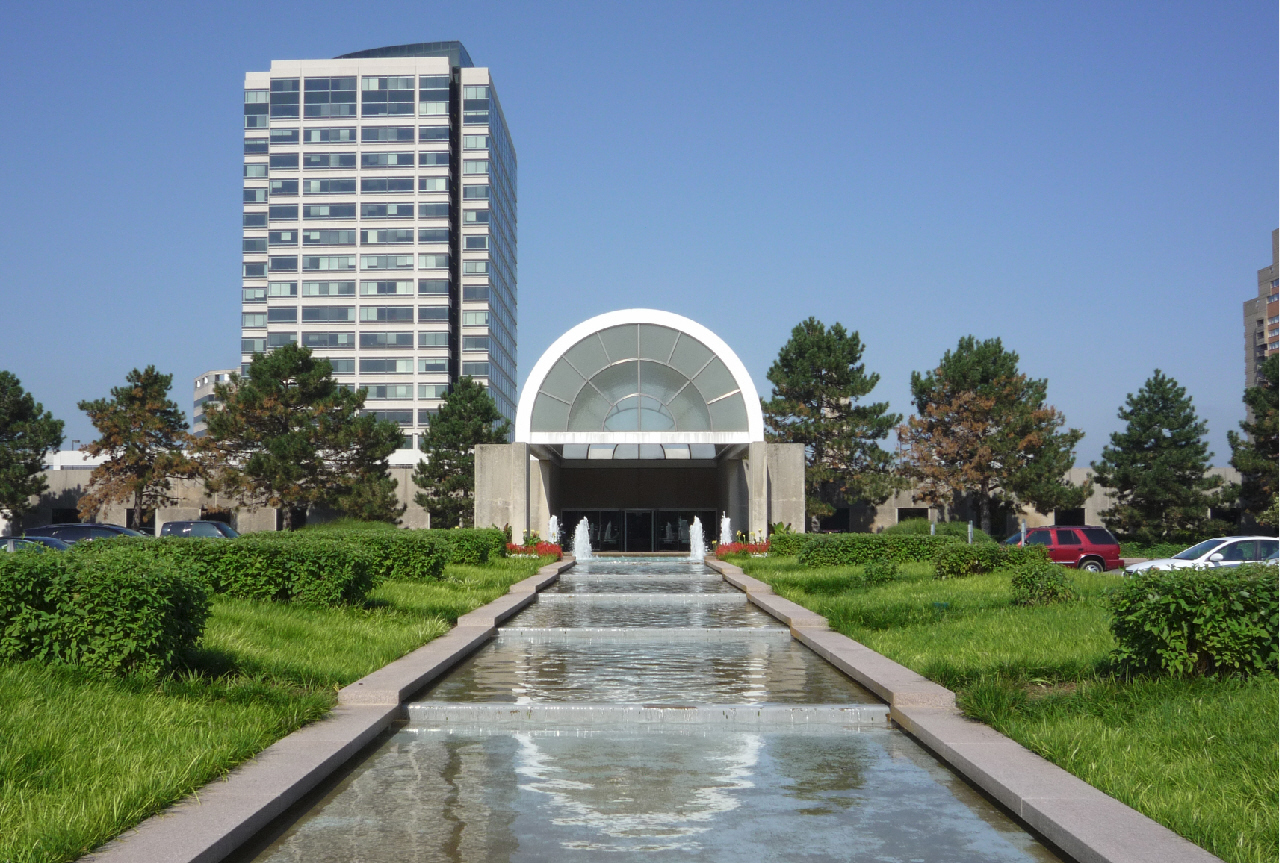
Hallmark corporate headquarters entrance

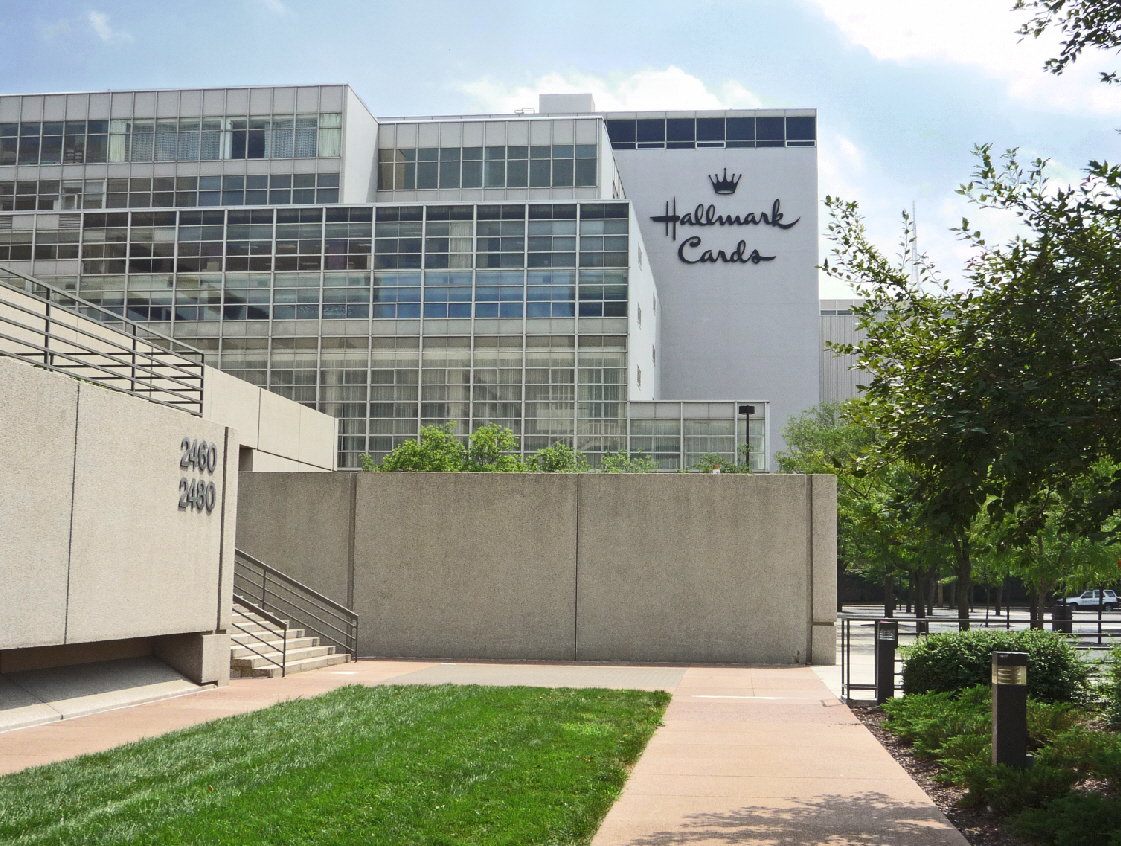
Hallmark corporate offices

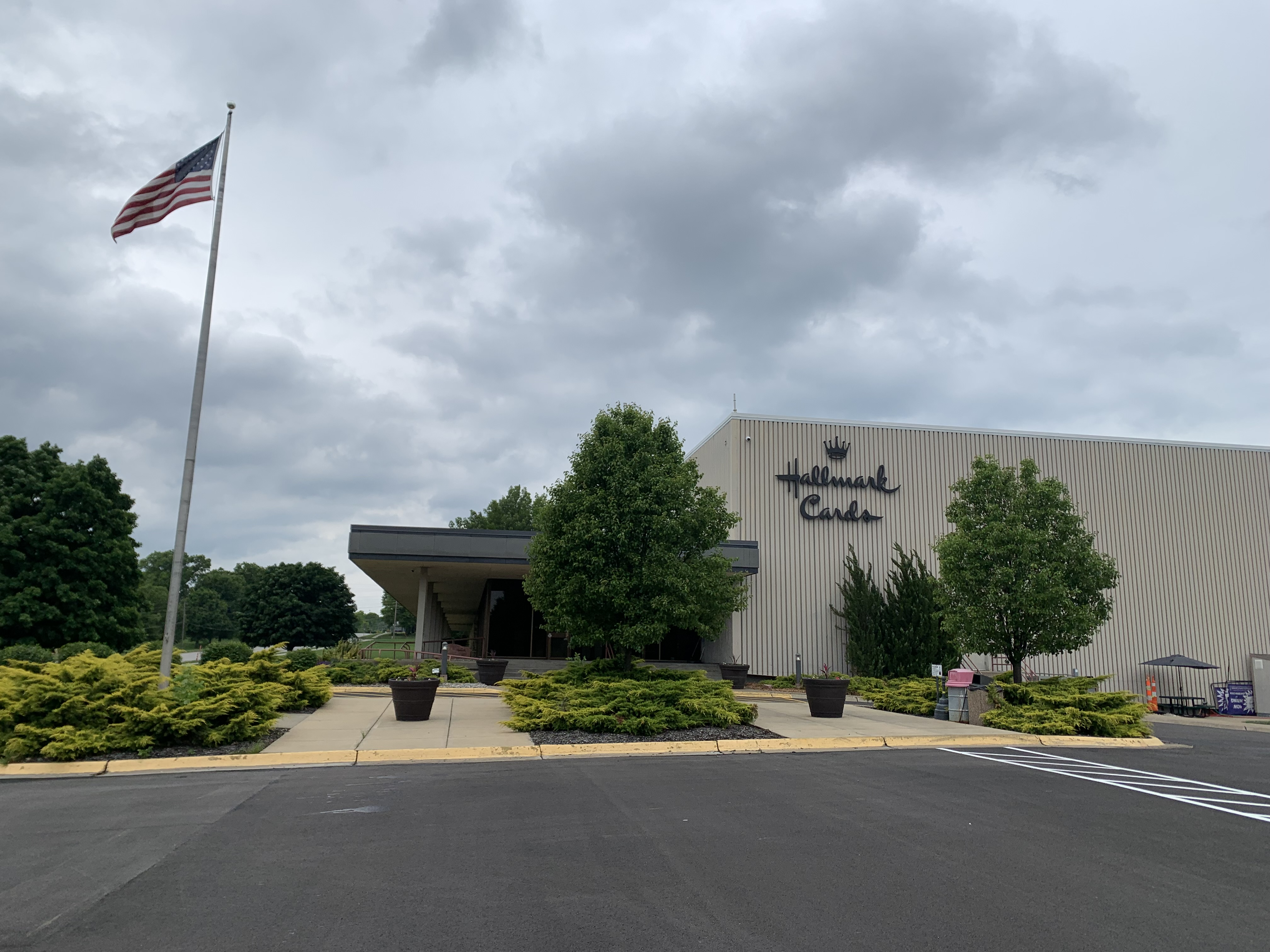
Hallmark Cards factory in Leavenworth, Kansas

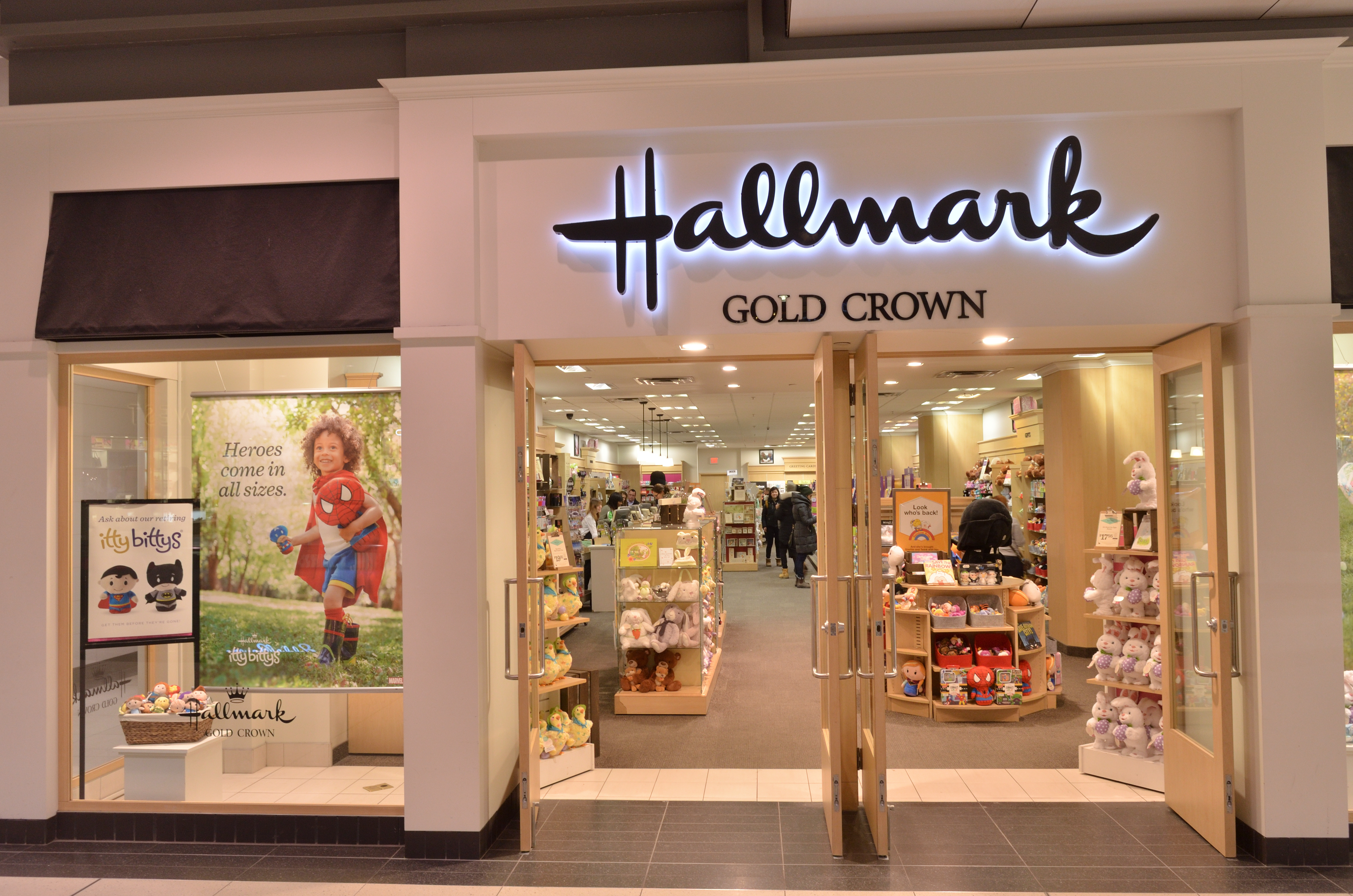
A Hallmark Store in Toronto Eaton Centre

Driven by an early 20th-century postcard craze, Joyce Clyde Hall and his older brothers, William and Rollie, began the Norfolk Post Card Company in 1907, initially headquartered in the Norfolk, Nebraska, bookstore at which they worked. The next year, Rollie bought out the store's non-family business partner and it became "Hall Brothers", doing business as the Hall Book Store. The postcard business soon outgrew the store's resources, and Joyce moved it to Kansas City in 1910. By 1912, the postcard craze had faded and the company had begun selling "Christmas letters" and greeting cards, shortening its name a few years later to the Norfolk Card Company.

In 1917, Hall and his brother Rollie "invented" modern wrapping paper when they ran out of traditional colored tissue paper at the stationery store and substituted fancy French envelope lining paper. After selling the lining paper again the next year, the Hall Brothers started printing their own specifically designed wrapping paper. In 1922, the company expanded throughout the country. The staff grew from 4 to 120 people, and the line increased from holiday cards to include everyday greeting cards.

In 1928, the company introduced the brand name Hallmark, after the hallmark symbol used by goldsmiths in London in the 14th century, and began printing the name on the back of every card. That same year, the company became the first in the greeting card industry to advertise their product nationally. Their first advertisement appeared in Ladies' Home Journal and was written by J.C. Hall himself. In 1931, the Canadian William E. Coutts Company, Ltd., a major card maker, became an affiliate of Hall Brothers – their first international business venture.

In 1944, it adopted its current slogan, "When you care enough to send the very best." It was created by C. E. Goodman, a Hallmark marketing and sales executive, and written on a 3x5 card. The card is on display at the company headquarters. In 1951, Hall sponsored a television program for NBC that gave rise to the Hallmark Hall of Fame, which has won 80 Emmy Awards. Hallmark now has its own cable television channel, the Hallmark Channel which was established in 2001. For a period of about 15 years, Hallmark owned a stake in the Spanish language network Univision.

In 1954, the company name was changed from Hall Brothers to Hallmark. In 1958, William E. Coutts Company, Ltd. was acquired by Hallmark. Until the 1990s, Hallmark's Canadian branch was known as Coutts Hallmark.

In 1973, Hallmark Cards started manufacturing Christmas ornaments. The first collection included 18 ornaments, including six glass ball ornaments. The Hallmark Keepsake Ornament collection is dated and available for just one year. By 1998, 11 million American households collected Hallmark ornaments, and 250,000 people were members of the Keepsake Ornament Collector's Club. The Collector's Club was launched nationally on June 1, 1987. One noted Christmas ornament authority was Clara Johnson Scroggins who wrote extensively about Keepsake Ornaments and had one of the largest private collections of Christmas ornaments.

In 1980, Hallmark Cards acquired Valentine & Sons of Dundee, Scotland, one of the world's oldest publishers of picture postcards. In 1984, it acquired W. N. Sharpe Holdings, a 114–year old British greeting card manufacturer for $52 million. The same year, it acquired Binney & Smith (later Crayola), a manufacturer of crayons for $204 million.

In 1998, Hallmark made a number of acquisitions, including Britain-based Creative Publishing (a recent spinoff of Fine Art Developments), and American-based InterArt.

As of 2014, The Paper Store LLC is one of the largest independently owned groups of Hallmark Gold Crown stores in the United States. This partnership began in the year 1972.

== Employees ==
Worldwide, Hallmark has over 27,000 employees; 20,000 of them work in the United States, about 5,600 of whom are full-time employees. About 2,700 Hallmarkers work at the Kansas City headquarters.

=== Management ===
On June 26, 2019, it was announced that Mike Perry would serve as president and CEO, while Donald J. Hall Jr. serves as executive chairman and David E. Hall as executive vice-chairman.

=== Creative resources ===
Hallmark's creative staff consists of around 900 artists, designers, stylists, writers, editors, and photographers. Together, they generate more than 19,000 new and redesigned greeting cards and related products per year. The company offers more than 48,000 products at any one time.

== Products and services ==
Hallmark offers or has offered the following products and services:

=== Greeting cards ===
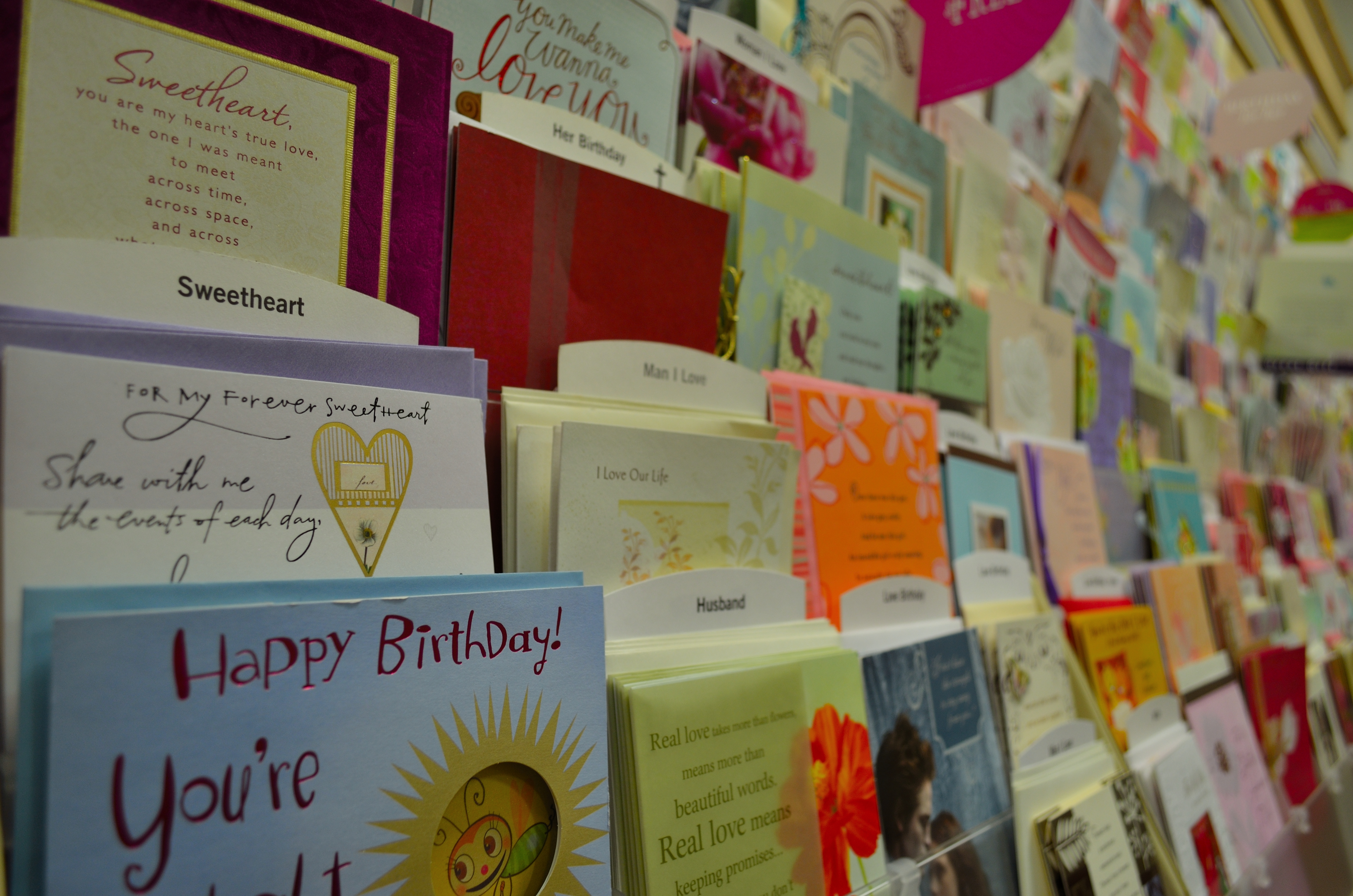
Hallmark birthday cards

Hallmark Cards feature several brands and licenses. Shoebox, the company's line of humorous cards, evolved from studio cards. Maxine™ was introduced in 1986 when she appeared on several Shoebox cards the year the alternative card line was launched. hoops&yoyo. and Revilo are other popular lines. Forever Friends was purchased in 1994 from English entrepreneur Andrew Brownsword, who for four years subsequently was Chief Executive of Hallmark Europe. Image Craft was acquired by the William E. Coutts Company subsidiary of Hallmark Canada in the mid-2000s.

Hallmark has provided software for creating and printing cards. This software has been known as Hallmark Card Studio, with partner Nova Development, and Microsoft Greetings Workshop in partner with Microsoft.

=== Gift products ===
- Gifts, greeting cards
- Ornaments (primarily Christmas-themed)
- Gift wrap
- Personalized items
- Party supplies
- Books
- Stationery
- Sentimental frames
- Recordable plush
- Plush figures
- Bookmarks
- Snowglobes

=== Licensors ===
Some of the licensors for Hallmark's greeting cards, ornaments, and gift products include:

- Beatrix Potter
- Dr. Seuss
- Enesco
- Epic Games
- Ford Motor Company
- General Motors
- Hasbro
- Harley-Davidson
- Marjolein Bastin
- Mattel
- MGM
- National Basketball Association
- National Football League
- National Hockey League
- Netflix
- Nickelodeon
  - Paws, Inc.
- Nintendo
- Peanuts
- Peyo
- Precious Moments, Inc.
- Rankin Bass
- Sanrio
- Sesame Street
- Sony Pictures
- Star Trek
- Tervis Tumbler
- The Hershey Company
- The Lego Group
- The Walt Disney Company
  - 20th Century Studios
    - Family Guy
    - Ice Age
    - The Simpsons
  - Marvel
  - The Muppets
  - Pixar
  - Star Wars
- The Wizard of Oz
- Thomas Kinkade
- Tim Burton
- Ty Inc
- Universal Studios
  - DreamWorks Animation
- Warner Bros.
  - Looney Tunes
  - DC Comics
  - Hanna-Barbera
  - Cartoon Network
- WildBrain

=== Hallmark Visitors Center ===
The Hallmark Visitors Center is located at the company's headquarters in Kansas City, Missouri. The Center features exhibits about the company's history including historic greeting cards and postcards, Christmas ornaments, exhibits from the company's art collection, and displays about the Hallmark Hall of Fame programs and awards. There is also a movie about the company's history.

=== Hallmark School Store ===
Alvirne High School in Hudson, New Hampshire, operates the only Hallmark school store in the United States. Besides normal food and beverage items, the "Bronco Barn" store also sells Hallmark cards. The store is run by students in Marketing I and Marketing II classes, and is open to students all day and after school.

== Subsidiaries and assets ==
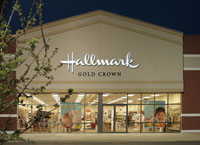
A Hallmark Gold Crown franchise in Evansville, Indiana

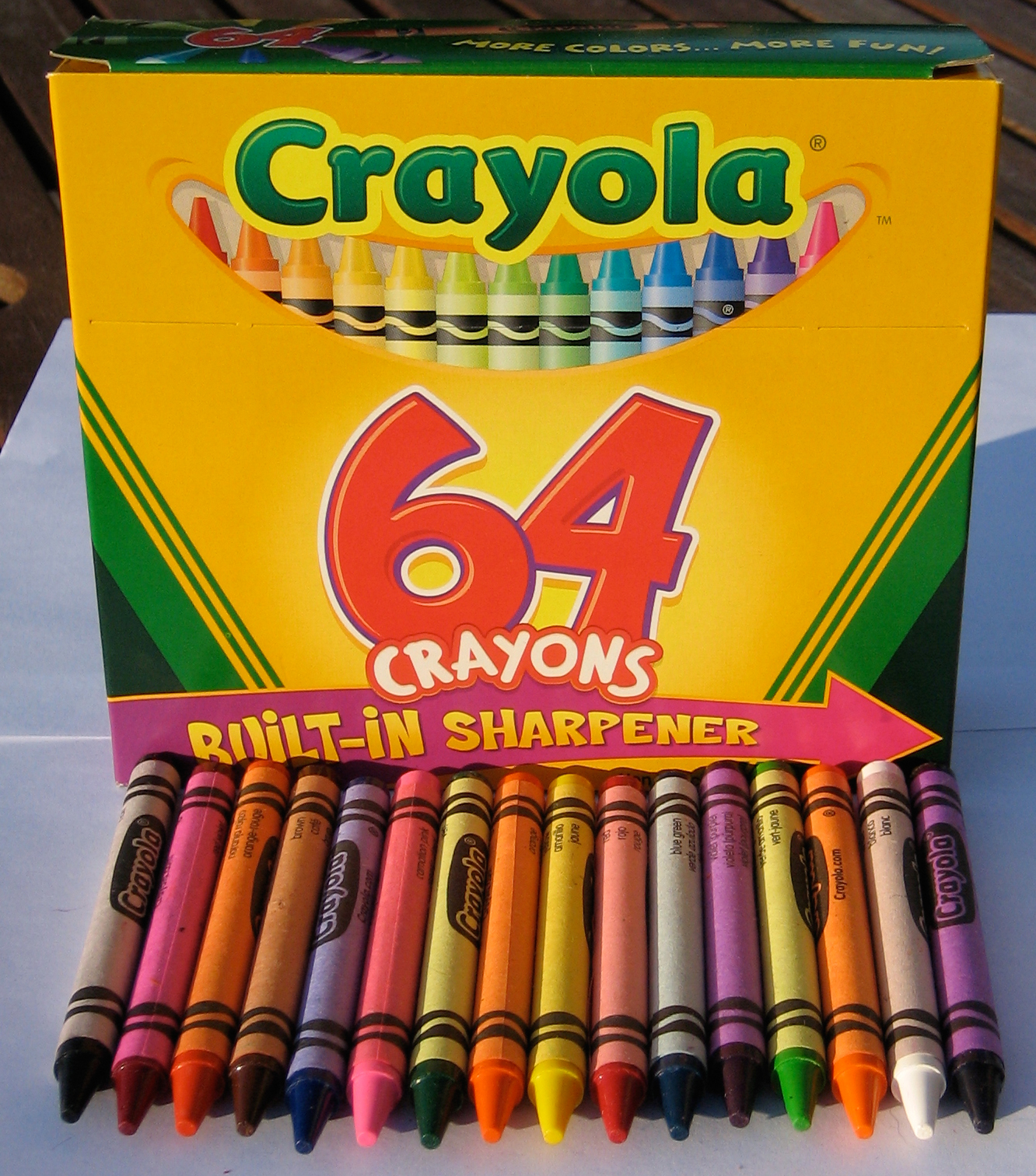
A Crayola pack of 64 crayons

Hallmark owns:

- Bernama TV: Malaysian news television network. Hallmark holds a 7% stake in the network.
- Crayola LLC (formerly Binney & Smith): makers of Crayola-brand crayons
- DaySpring Greeting Cards, is the world's largest Christian greeting card company. It was purchased in 1999 from Cook Publishing and is based in Siloam Springs, Arkansas.
- Hallmark Baby: Baby clothing, toy, and decor sales website that sells exclusive Hallmark products.
- Hallmark Channel: cable television network—Hallmark Cards owns this now privately held company (Crown Media Holdings), having acquired the stake it didn't own from Liberty Media; the network launched the Hallmark Mystery sister channel (formerly known as Hallmark Movie Channel and Hallmark Movies & Mysteries) in January 2004, and Hallmark Family (formerly Hallmark Drama) in October 2017.
- Hallmark Gold Crown: a chain of independently-owned card and gift stores in the United States and Canada. Certain locations are corporate operated.
- Halls, an upscale department store at Kansas City's Crown Center
- Hallmark+: A premium subscription video on-demand (SVOD) service that is the primary streaming provider of Hallmark films, features, TV series and original productions. As of September 2024 (when it rebranded from Hallmark Movies Now), it also serves a secondary purpose as a loyalty program for Hallmark Gold Crown stores.
- Rainbow Brite: a franchise of children's dolls; includes the TV series produced by DIC Entertainment, with a 1985 theatrical film, Rainbow Brite and the Star Stealer produced by DIC and distributed by Warner Bros. Discovery.
- Shirt Tales: a franchise of cards, featuring animals with shirts that read different messages; property licensed for a 1982 animated series for NBC created by Hanna-Barbera Productions, whose rights are owned by the Turner Entertainment division of Warner Bros. Discovery.
- Sunrise Greetings: Located in Bloomington, Indiana
- Zoobilee Zoo: a 1986 live-action children's series featuring a number of contemporary Broadway theatre players, centered around a zoo populated by animals with artistic tastes.

In addition, Hallmark Cards is the property manager of the Crown Center commercial complex, adjacent to its headquarters, and the owner of lithographer Litho-Krome Co.

=== Photographic Collection ===
In 2006, Hallmark donated its Hallmark Photographic Collection, an extensive collection of photographs by prominent photographers including Todd Webb, to the Nelson-Atkins Museum of Art in Kansas City.

=== Maxine ===
"Maxine" is a fictional character featured in a line of greeting cards first published by Hallmark's Shoebox collection in 1986. As of 2017, more than 160 million Maxine greeting cards have been sold. The comic strip-style character, portrayed as an irascible older woman, was created by Hallmark in-house artist John Wagner, and in addition to greeting cards has been featured on t-shirts, coffee mugs, holiday ornaments, and other items. She is often accompanied by her Bull Terrier, Floyd. In 1999, she was featured in an animated holiday television special, "Maxine's Christmas Carol."

=== Hallmark Music ===
In the Philippines, singer Richard Tan sang a song about Hallmark Cards, entitled "No One Throws Away Memories". The song was featured in a commercial of the product in the 1970s.

In the mid-1980s, the company started its music division, issuing compilation albums by a number of popular artists. In 2004, Hallmark entered into a licensing agreement with Somerset Entertainment to produce Hallmark Music CDs.

=== Former subsidiaries ===
- Hallmark Entertainment: a producer of television shows and miniseries. Robert Halmi acquired the company in 2006 and it was absorbed into RHI Entertainment.
- Univision: Hallmark owned the Spanish-language broadcaster from 1986 to 1992.
- Hallmark Business Connections: Formed in August 1995, this business-to-business subsidiary offered customized greeting cards and incentive programs. It was sold in June 2019 to Atlanta payments company InComm.

== Copyright lawsuits ==
Neil Armstrong sued Hallmark Cards in 1994 after they used his name and a recording of his quote, "That's one small step for a man, one giant leap for mankind" in a Christmas ornament without permission. The lawsuit was settled out of court for an undisclosed amount of money which Armstrong donated to Purdue University. The case caused Armstrong and NASA to be more careful about the use of astronaut names, photographs and recordings, and to whom he had granted permission. For non-profit and government public-service announcements, he would usually give permission.

On September 6, 2007, Paris Hilton filed an injunction lawsuit against Hallmark Cards Inc., titled Hilton v. Hallmark Cards, in U.S. District Court over the unlawful use of her picture and catchphrase "That's hot" on a greeting card. The card is titled Paris's First Day as a Waitress with a photograph of Hilton's face on a cartoon of a waitress serving a plate of food, with a dialogue bubble, "Don't touch that, it's hot." (which had a trademark registered on February 13, 2007). Hilton's attorney Brent Blakely said that the infringement damages would be based on profits from the $2.49 greeting cards. A Hallmark spokesperson said that the card was intended as parody, protected under fair use law. The Court of Appeals for the Ninth Circuit reviewed the case and "denied Hallmark's motion to dismiss". Hilton and Hallmark Cards Inc. later settled out of court.

== Foreign branches ==
- Hallmark Australia
- Hallmark Belgium
- Hallmark Canada
- Hallmark Germany
- Hallmark Netherlands
- Hallmark UK & Ireland
- Nihon Hallmark (Japan)

== See also ==
- Cardmaking
- Hallmark holiday
