= Paul László =

Hungarian-American architect

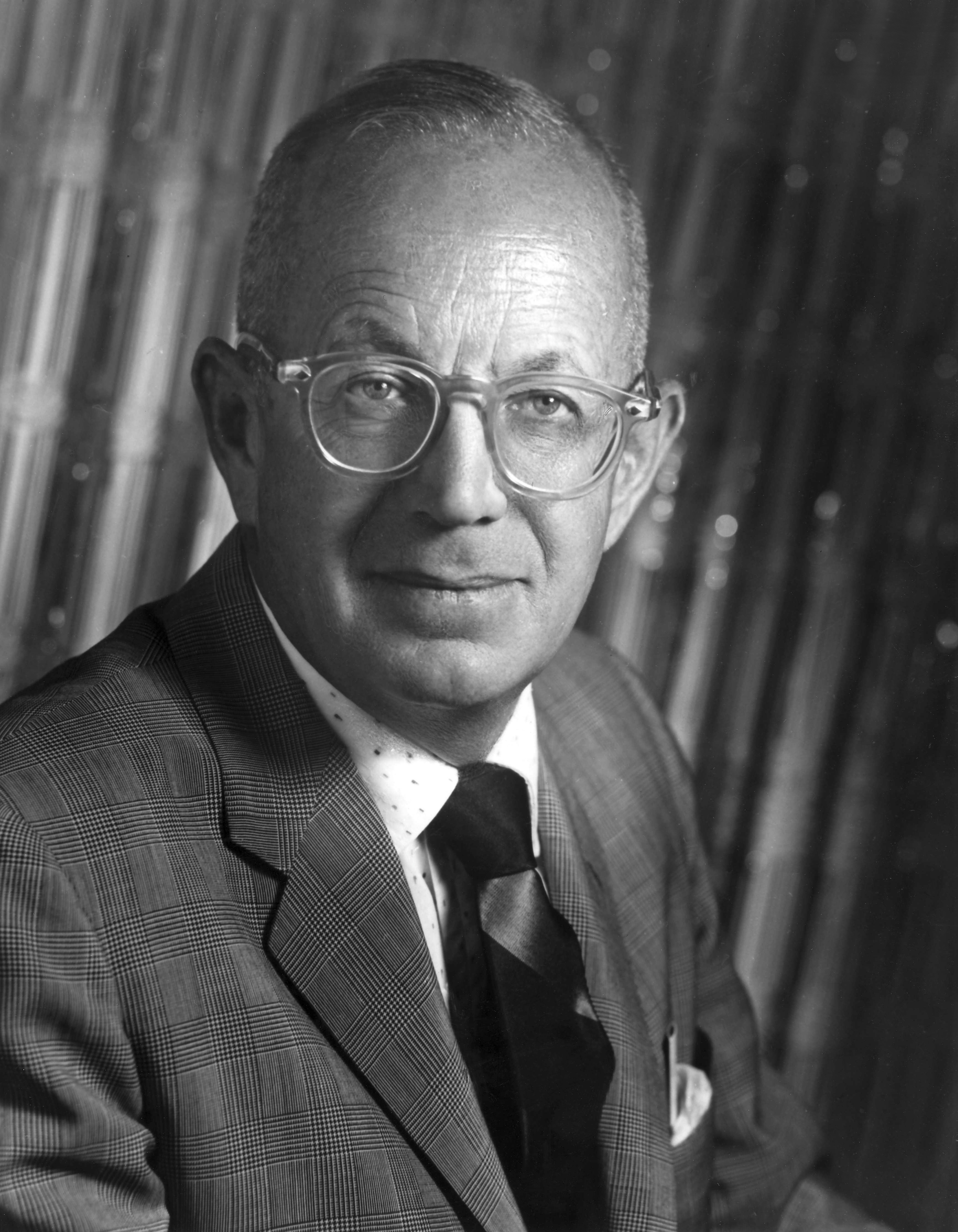
- Paul László circa 1960
- Born: Lamberger Pal; 6 February 1900; Debrecen, Austria-Hungary
- Died: 27 March 1993 (aged 93); Santa Monica, California
- Occupation: Architect
- Spouse: Maxine Fife
- Parents: Schwarcz Regina; László Ignac
- Buildings: Crown Center; Bullock's Wilshire; Hertz Bomb Shelter; Ohrbach's; Brentwood Country Club

Paul László (6 February 1900 – 27 March 1993) was a Hungarian-born architect and interior designer. He was known as a designer in Europe before 1936, and in the United States afterwards. He built his reputation designing interiors for houses, but in the 1960s, largely shifted his focus to the design of retail and commercial interiors.

== Biography ==
László was born as Lamberger Pal in Debrecen, then in Austria-Hungary, to Jewish parents Lamberger Ignác and László Regina (née Schwarcz). His family later moved to Szombathely. Sources citing his birthplace as Budapest are incorrect. He had three sisters and two brothers; two of his sisters and both of his parents were murdered in the Holocaust, along with seven other relatives not in his immediate family.

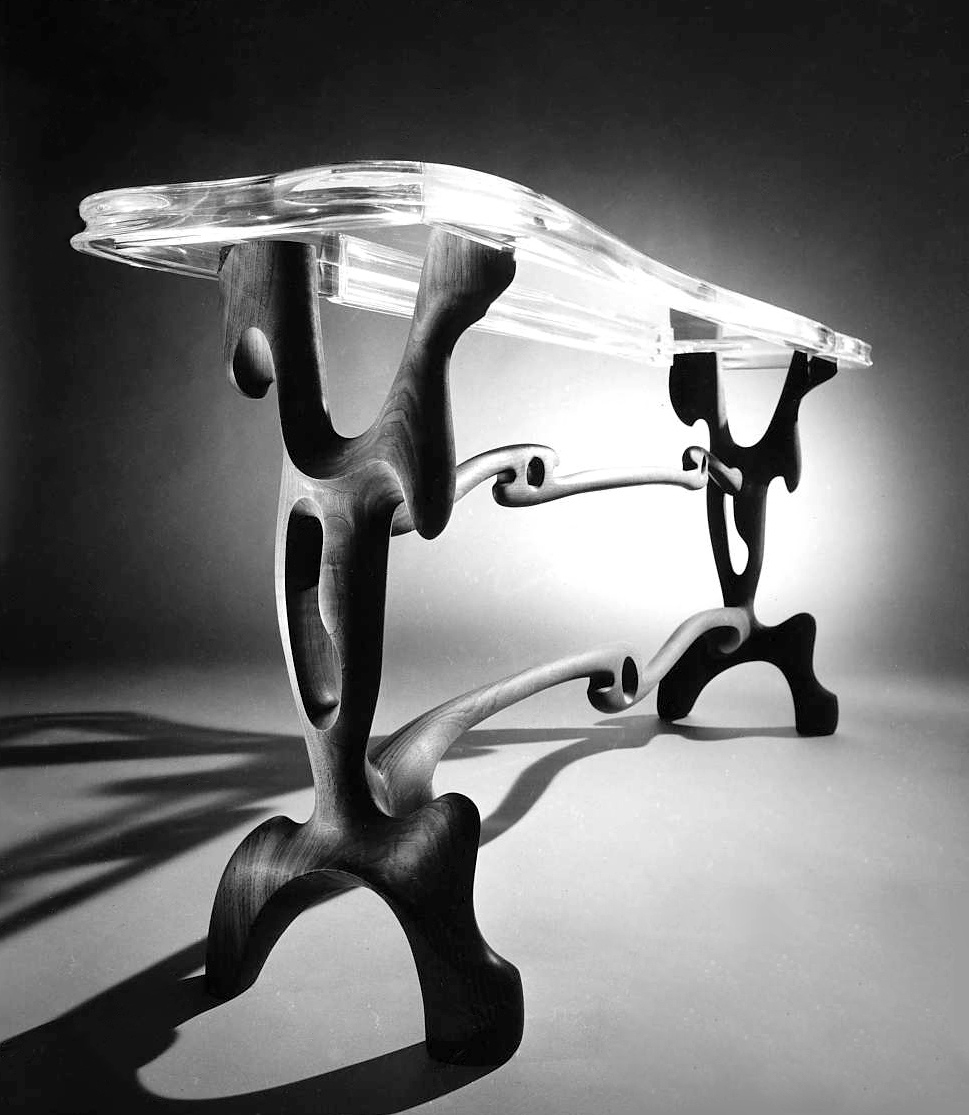
Console table designed as a tribute to Salvador Dalí

László completed his education in Vienna before moving to Stuttgart, where he rapidly established himself as a prominent designer, winning the admiration of, among others, Salvador Dalí. However, rising antisemitism and Nazism made László's position precarious in Europe due to his Jewish ancestry. He applied for and accepted a professorship teaching architecture at the Universidad Tecnica Federico Santa Maria in Chile. However, never intending to go to South America, László was hidden by friends until 1936, when he secured passage on an ocean liner to New York City. Ironically, and without László's knowledge, some of his work appeared in Adolf Hitler's Kehlsteinhaus; this infuriated Albert Speer, chief architect of Nazi Germany and close advisor to Hitler.

After arriving in New York, László bought an automobile and drove to Beverly Hills, California, where he established a practice on Rodeo Drive. Starting in 1941 and continuing for over 25 years, László maintained his design studio at 362 North Rodeo Drive. László rented the entire building from the owner when it was still incomplete; he immediately took on the task of designing the interiors, the exterior details and all of the furniture, complete with fabrics. The studio also had a small area showcasing his work. By 1952, his business made $1.5 million each year.

In the 1940s, before and after World War II, László took William Krisel as an apprentice while he was studying at the University of Southern California.

Carved table lamp. Woven shade by Maria Kipp; form sculpted by Frank Frederick Kern (1896–1977).

From 1948 to 1952, László joined with George Nelson, Charles Eames and Isamu Noguchi to design for the Herman Miller company. He also worked with Brown Saltman, a furniture company in California.

László designed department stores for Bullock's Wilshire, Saks Fifth Avenue, Ohrbach's, Goldwater's, J. W. Robinson's, Hudson's Bay and Halls (specifically Crown Center). He also designed casinos and showrooms in hotels owned by Howard Hughes in Las Vegas. László designed bomb shelters for John D. Hertz. He conceived "Atomville", a futuristic underground city; a later version was proposed in a letter to the U.S. Air Force.

Bomb shelter designed by László

László served in both World Wars. In World War I, he fought with the Hungarian artillery on the Italian front. In World War II, he enlisted in the United States Army.

László retired in the early 1990s.

Chair designed for McCullough Corporation, Los Angeles, 1954

László donated much of his original materials to the Architecture and Design Collection at the University of California, Santa Barbara. His work is occasionally displayed at the Museum of Modern Art in New York City and is frequently seen in national and international retrospectives on 20th-century design.

== Personal life ==
Paul László was married twice and had one son with his second wife, the actress Maxine Fife.
