= Capitol Federal Savings Bank =

Regional bank based in Kansas

Capitol Federal Financial Inc.
- Company type: Public
- Traded as: Nasdaq: CFFN; S&P 600 component
- Industry: Financial services
- Founded: September 16, 1893; 132 years ago in Topeka, Kansas, U.S.
- Headquarters: Topeka, Kansas, U.S.
- Number of locations: 46 traditional branches, 5 in-store locations (2024)
- Area served: Kansas; Missouri
- Key people: John B. Dicus (president, chairman, CEO); Kent G. Townsend (CFO)
- Products: Banking
- Services: Savings and loans
- Revenue: ▼US$188.3 million (2023); US$302.4 million (2022)
- Net income: ▼ -US$101.7 million (2023); US$84.5 million (2022)
- Total assets: ▲US$10.2 billion (2023); US$9.6 billion (2022)
- Total equity: ▼US$1.0 billion (2023); US$1.1 billion (2022)
- Number of employees: ▼649 (2023); 733 (2022)
- Website: www.capfed.com

Capitol Federal Savings Bank (CapFed) is a federally chartered and insured savings bank founded in 1893 and headquartered in Topeka, Kansas. Capitol Federal has 51 locations serving both the Kansas and Missouri sides of the Kansas City metropolitan area with personal and business financial services. It is owned by holding company Capitol Federal Financial Inc. for trading on the Nasdaq.

== History ==
On September 16, 1893, during the Panic of 1893, fifteen men formed the Savings and Loan Association of Topeka, including "bankers, insurance agents, attorneys, railroad employees, the president of a dry goods store, the Topeka City School Superintendent and a physician." Their first office was located above a Rock Island Railroad ticket office.

In July 1899, the organization's name changed to the Capitol Building and Loan Association. In 1926, Henry Bubb was hired as a clerk. In 1938, the organization underwent another name change, becoming the Capitol Federal Savings and Loan Association. They also adopted a federal charter, with deposits insured by the Federal Savings and Loan Insurance Corporation. The association's board of directors named Bubb the association's president in 1941.

In 1943, Capitol Federal was named the largest federally insured association in Kansas. Its assets reached $100 million in 1958 (equivalent to $1.1 billion in 2025). John C. Dicus joined Capitol Federal in March 1959. On December 9, 1961, Capitol Federal opened a new headquarters location in Topeka, complete with a fallout shelter as a civil defense measure during the Cold War. In 1975, Capitol Federal became the second savings and loan institution to offer its customers account access outside of its buildings. Two years later, in 1977, its assets reached $1 billion (equivalent to $5.3 billion in 2025).

Bubb died in 1989, leading to John C. Dicus being named chairman. In October 1996, John B. Dicus was elected president, with John C. Dicus remaining chairman and CEO. On March 31, 1999, Capitol Federal finished a plan to convert from a mutual savings association to a stock savings bank, becoming known as Capitol Federal Savings Bank. As part of this plan, the Capitol Federal Foundation was also established. Capitol Federal introduced its online portal, True Blue Online, in 2001.

In January 2009, John C. Dicus reached 50 years of employment with Capitol Federal, the board's mandatory retirement age. He retired as chairman, leading to John B. Dicus's election as chairman, president, and CEO.

In 2014, the headquarters of the University of Kansas School of Business was announced to be renamed Capitol Federal Hall after Capitol Federal donated $20 million through its foundation to the school. This decision faced some criticism, with many people opposing the growing trend of corporate names on school buildings.

Capitol Federal was named one of the Forbes Top 50 Most Trustworthy Financial Companies in 2014. In 2015, Capitol Federal upgraded its debit cards to include EMV chips and Apple Pay support. Capitol Federal acquired Capital City Bank on August 31, 2018, finishing its integration into Capitol Federal on April 12, 2019.

As of July 2024, Capitol Federal has 46 traditional branches and 5 in-store locations, totaling 51 locations in the Kansas City metropolitan area.

== Capitol Federal Financial ==
Capitol Federal is owned by holding company Capitol Federal Financial Inc., which is traded on the Nasdaq Stock Market as CFFN. The stock is a component of the Nasdaq Financial-100 and S&P SmallCap 600 indices.

== Lines of business ==
Capitol Federal Savings Bank offers a range of personal and business services.

=== Personal banking and investments ===
Capitol Federal provides checking accounts, savings accounts, certificates of deposit, and individual retirement accounts for personal use. They have options for mortgages and consumer loans, and they work with Sallie Mae to provide student loans. Capitol Federal also offers trust management services for families.

=== Business banking ===
For businesses, Capitol Federal provides banking accounts and loan options. They also offer payment processing for merchants.

=== Insurance ===
Capitol Federal refers customers to Capitol Agency, a separate subsidiary that provides home, vehicle, business, and life insurance.

== Gallery ==
Capitol Federal Savings Bank buildings

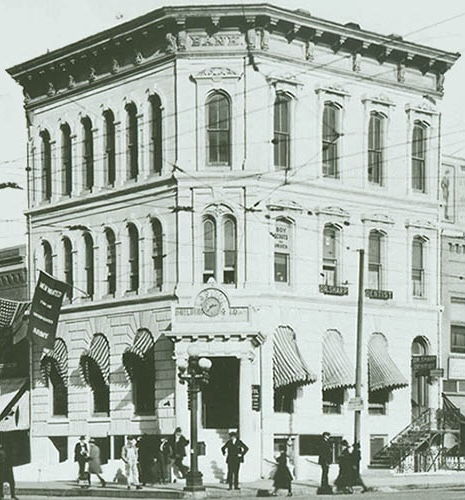
The Capitol Building and Loan Association's first office in Topeka, Kansas

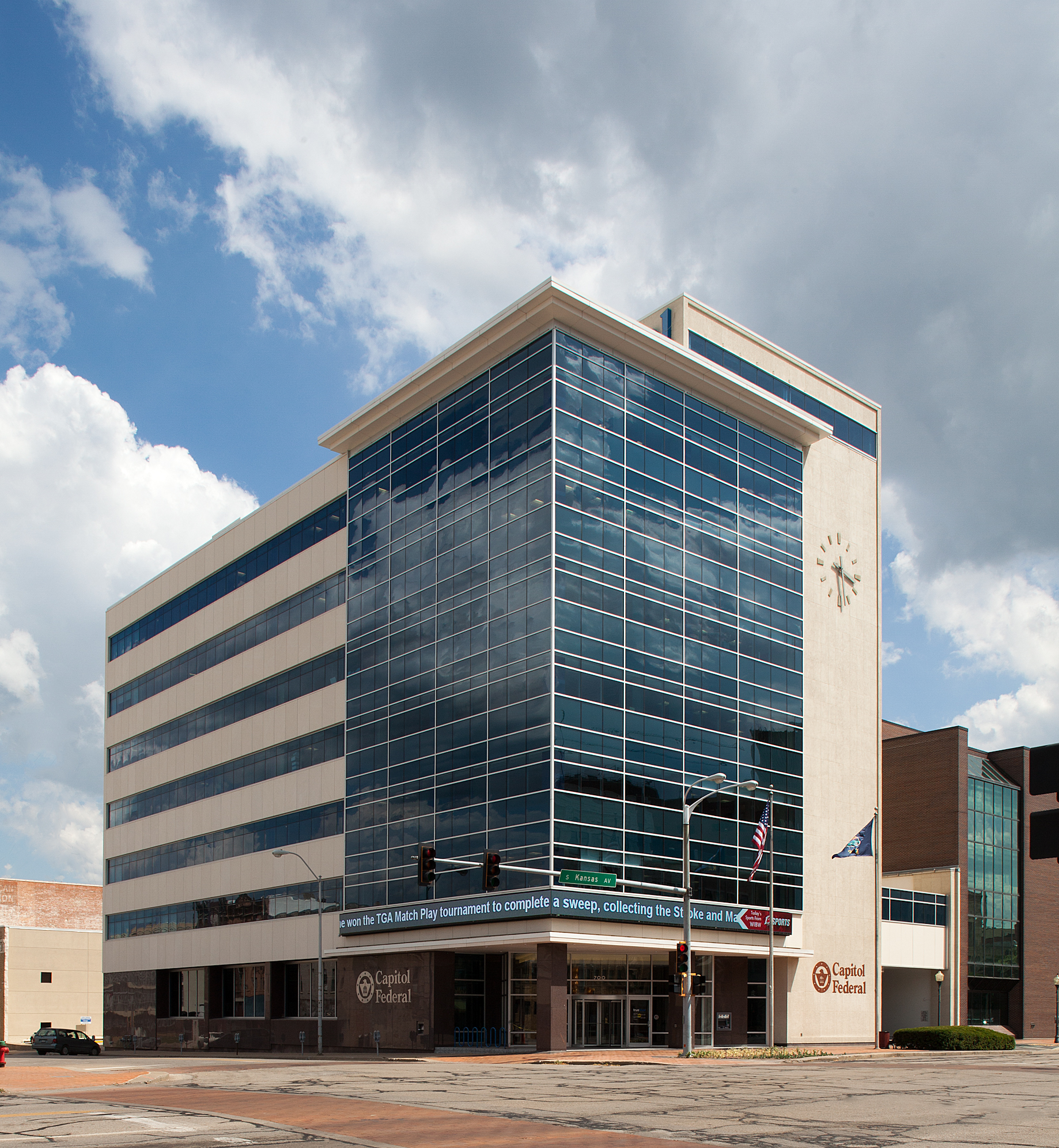
Capitol Federal's current headquarters in Topeka
