= Garney Holding Company =

Provider of water and wastewater piping systems

Garney Holding Company, Inc
- Industry: Construction Management, General Contracting
- Founded: 1961
- Founder: Charles Garney
- Headquarters: 1333 N.W. Vivion Road Kansas City
- Number of locations: 7 Offices in the US
- Area served: United States
- Key people: Matthew Reaves (President); David Burkhart (CEO)
- Products: Wastewater Piping Systems; Water Treatment Facilities
- Revenue: $347 million (2008)
- Number of employees: 650 (2008)
- Divisions: Pipe; Water Treatment Facilities
- Subsidiaries: Garney Companies, Inc. Grimm Construction Company, Inc. Garney Wyoming

Garney Holding Company is a provider of water and wastewater piping systems in the United States with a construction volume of $347 million in 2008. It is based out of Kansas City, Missouri.

== History ==
Charles Garney founded Garney Construction in 1961 as a pipeline and utility construction company. Over the next two decades it also became a contractor in water and wastewater systems. In 2001 the company acquired Grimm Construction, a contractor with operations in Colorado and Arizona.
