= List of tallest buildings in Kansas City =

Skyline of Kansas City
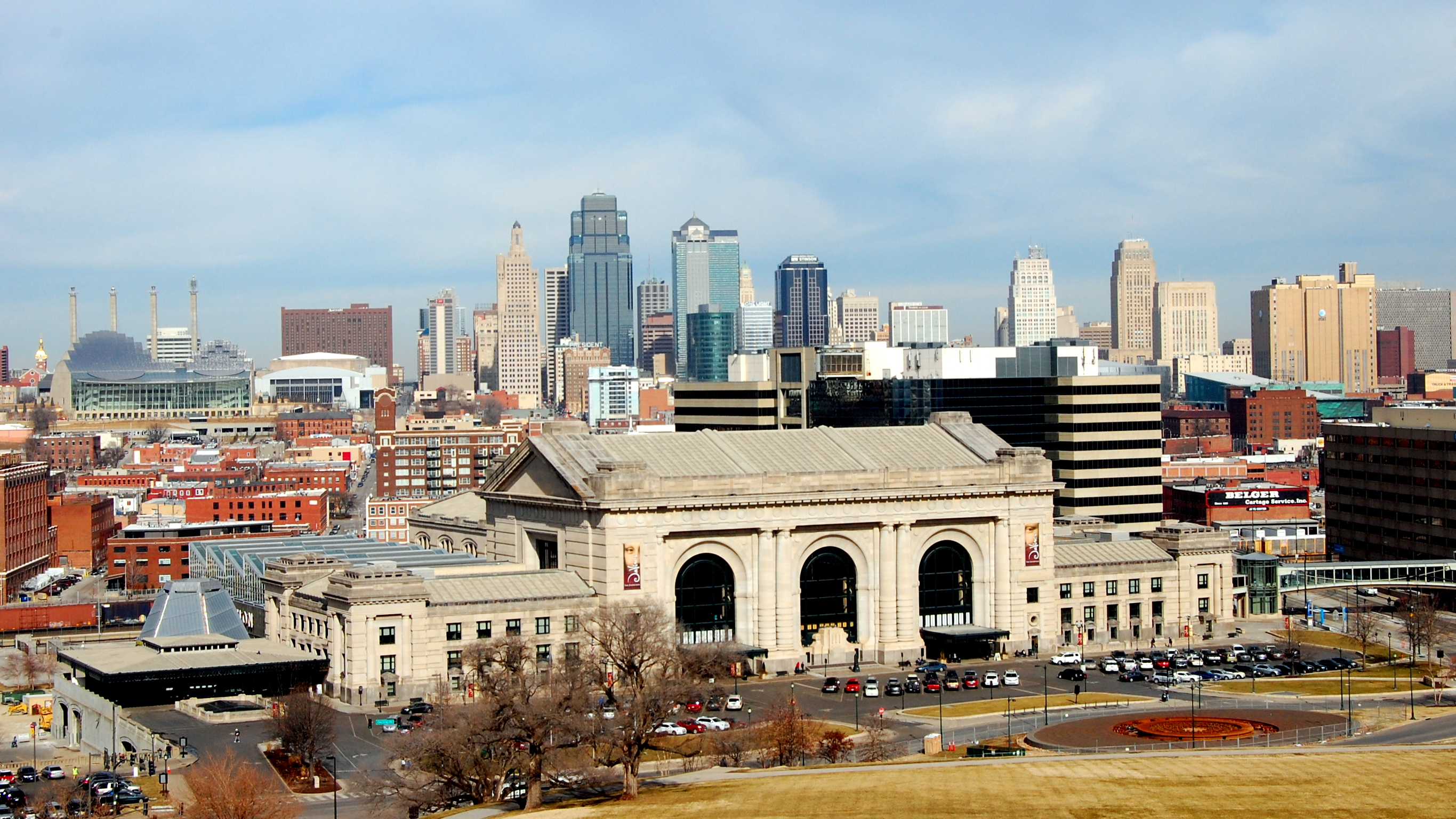
- Kansas City Union Station with Downtown Kansas City in the background in 2018
- Tallest building: One Kansas City Place (1988)
- Tallest building height: 623 ft (189.9 m)
- Major clusters: Downtown Kansas City; Crown Center
- First 150 m+ building: Town Pavilion (1986)

Number of tall buildings (2026)
- Taller than 100 m (328 ft): 14
- Taller than 150 m (492 ft): 2

Number of tall buildings — feet
- Taller than 200 ft (61.0 m): 52
- Taller than 300 ft (91.4 m): 18

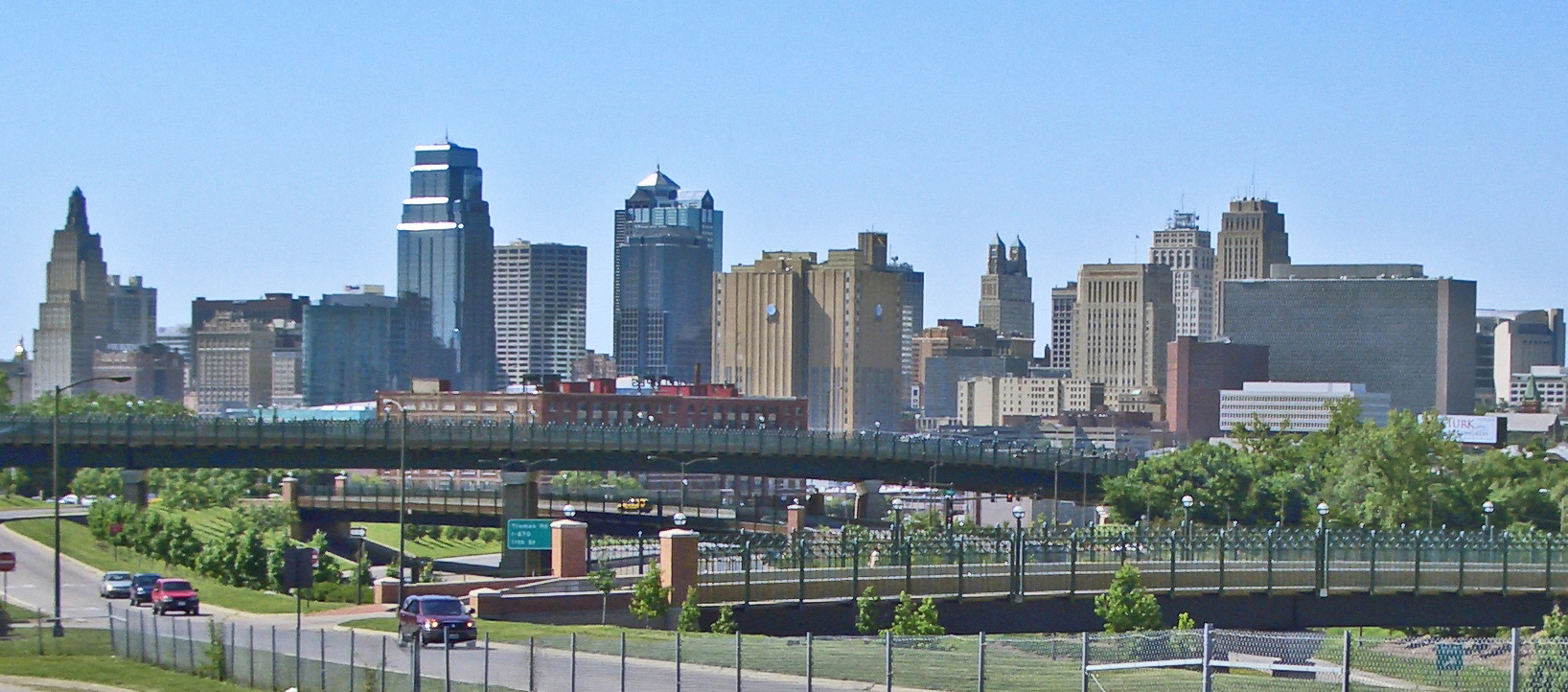
Downtown Kansas City skyline, looking northwest

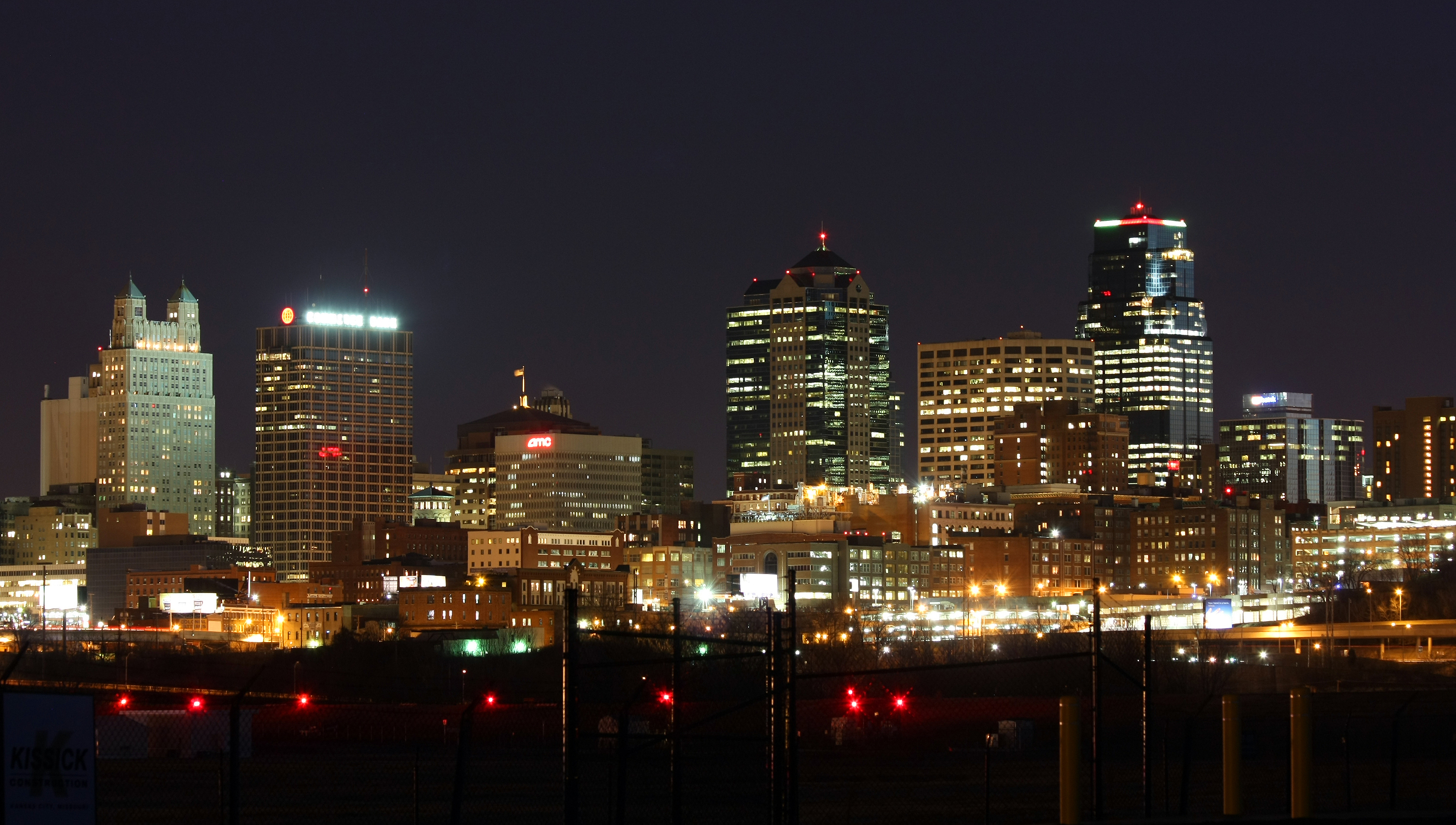
Kansas City from Wheeler Airport at night

Kansas City is the largest city in the U.S. state of Missouri, with a metropolitan area of 2.25 million residents that straddles the Missouri–Kansas border. As of 2026, Kansas City is home to 52 buildings taller than 200 feet (61 m). Eighteen of these are over 300 feet (91 m), more than any other city in Missouri, including St. Louis. The tallest building in the city is One Kansas City Place, a 42-story office skyscraper rising 623 ft (189.9 m) high and completed in 1988. Along with St. Louis, Kansas City makes up the majority of the tallest buildings in Missouri.

Kansas City grew rapidly in the late 19th century as the Hannibal bridge was built over the Missouri River. The first high-rise in the city is the New York Life Building, an Italian Renaissance 12-story structure built for the eponymous insurance company in 1889. More early skyscrapers followed, including the R.A. Long Building in 1907. Then the tallest edifice in the city, it was home to the Federal Reserve Bank of Kansas City from 1914 until 1921, when they relocated to the city's new tallest building at 925 Grand. The 1920s saw a high-rise boom that lasted until the early 1930s. Major additions during this time include Oak Tower, the twin-spired 909 Walnut, and the 481 ft (147 m) Kansas City Power and Light Building, which was the city's tallest building for over 50 years. While the Great Depression brought an end to the boom, the Art Deco and Beaux-Arts styled Kansas City City Hall—the third tallest city hall in the United States—was completed in 1937.

A second, larger skyscraper boom took place from the 1960s to early 1990s. More office towers were constructed downtown. The 1980s saw greater heights with Town Pavilion and One Kansas City both overtaking the Power and Light Building as the city's tallest. High-rises were also built in the areas of Crown Center and Country Club District. Since the 1990s, the pace of high-rise development has slowed. In the 2000s, a multi-billion initiative to revitalize downtown involved the construction of an 18-story headquarters for locally based tax preparation firm H&R Block. This has spurred further redevelopment in the surrounding Power & Light District—named after the Power and Light Building—including the "Light" trio of residential towers built between 2015 and 2023. Many high-rises were converted to residential use in the 21st century, including the Power and Light Building and 909 Walnut; Kansas City is among the U.S. cities with the most apartments created from residential conversion.

The majority of high-rises in Kansas City are located in its downtown, surrounded on all sides by the Downtown Loop. South of downtown, Crown Center is home to numerous buildings over that height, including the city's sixth-tallest building, a Sheraton hotel. Further south is the Country Club District, an upscale district with a small number of towers. In the Kansas City metropolitan area, Overland Park has a small collection of commercial high-rises. Penn Valley Park, directly west of Crown Center, is a popular spot to view and photograph the downtown skyline, particularly from the Liberty Memorial Tower at the National World War I Museum and Memorial. From there, the city's skyscrapers appear behind Kansas City Union Station.

== History ==
Number of buildings by height in Kansas City by the end of each year, based on the list below. This takes into account one demolished building. Click on the legend to toggle a specific height on or off. View chart definition.

== Cityscape ==
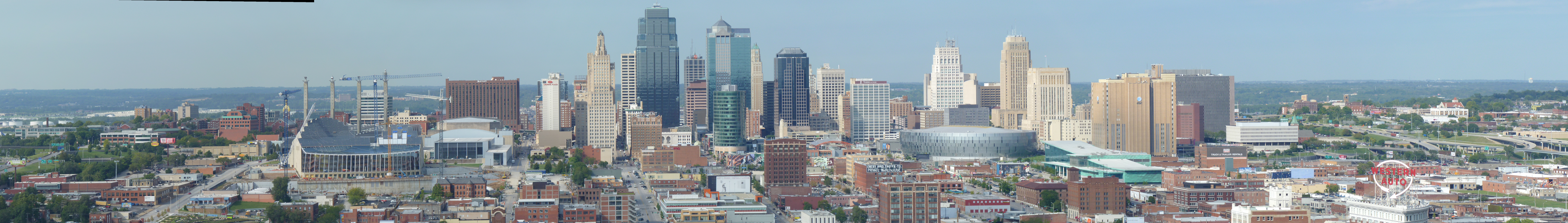
A panoramic view of the Kansas City skyline, taken from the WWI memorial in 2010. The Kauffman Center for the Performing Arts is seen on the left, still under construction.

== Map of tallest buildings ==
=== Downtown Kansas City ===
Downtown Kansas City has the highest number of tall buildings in the city. The maps below show the location of buildings taller than 200 ft (61 m) in downtown. Each marker is numbered by the building's height rank, and colored by the decade of its completion.

Buildings taller than 200 ft (61 m) in Downtown Kansas City.
- 1950s and before
- 1960s
- 1970s
- 1980s
- 1990s
- 2000s
- 2010s
- 2020s
1 One Kansas City Place
2 Town Pavilion
3 Kansas City Power and Light Building
4 909 Walnut
5 Kansas City City Hall
7 1201 Walnut
8 Commerce Tower
9 City Center Square
10 Oak Tower
13 Commerce Bank Building
14 AT&T Long Lines Building
15 Bryant Building
17 Three Light
18 One Light
19 Richard Bolling Federal Building
20 925 Grand
21 Crowne Plaza Kansas City Downtown
22 Jackson County Courthouse
23 Charles Evans Whittaker Federal Courthouse
24 Wallstreet Tower
25 H&R Block World Headquarters
26 Mark Twain Tower
27 Loews Kansas City Hotel
28 The Grand
29 12 Wyandotte Plaza
31 Ten Main Center
32 Two Light Tower
33 Kansas City Marriott Downtown
34 Commerce Trust Building
36 1400KC
37 Hotel Phillips
43 Grand Boulevard Lofts
47 Kansas City Club Building
49 The View
50 21 Ten Lofts
51 R.A. Long Building
52 Professional Building

=== Crown Center ===
Crown Center is a shopping center and neighborhood located south of Downtown Kansas City and east of Penn Valley Park. The tallest building in the neighborhood is the Sheraton Kansas City Hotel at Crown Center, the sixth-tallest building in the city and the tallest outside of downtown.

Buildings taller than 200 ft (61 m) in the Crown Center neighborhood of Kansas City.
- 1960s
- 1970s
- 1980s
- 2000s
6 Sheraton Kansas City Hotel at Crown Center
11 2345 Grand
12 2555 Grand
16 San Francisco Tower
30 BMA Tower
35 1 Memorial Drive
41 2405 Grand
42 The Westin Kansas City at Crown Center

=== Country Club District ===
Country Club District is located south of Crown Center and north of Brush Creek. A small number of high-rises can be found there alongside in Plaza-Westport and South Plaza neighborhoods.

Buildings taller than 200 ft (61 m) in the Country Club District of Kansas City.
- 1960s
- 1980s
- 1990s
- 2020s
38 Alameda Tower
39 American Century Towers I
40 American Century Towers II
44 Kansas City Marriott Country Club Plaza
45 Plaza West
46 The Sulgrave
48 46 Penn Centre

== Tallest buildings ==
This list ranks completed buildings in Kansas City that stand at least 200 ft (61 m) tall as of 2026, based on standard height measurement. This includes spires and architectural details but does not include antenna masts. The “Year” column indicates the year of completion. Buildings tied in height are sorted by year of completion with earlier buildings ranked first, and then alphabetically.

Was the tallest building in Kansas City upon completion

Rank	Name	Image	Location	Height ft (m)	Floors	Year	Purpose	Notes
1	One Kansas City Place		1200 Main Street 39°05′59″N 94°35′02″W	623 (189.9)	42	1988	Office	Tallest building in Missouri. Tallest building completed in Kansas City in the 1980s. Contains 1.3 million square feet (120,000 square meters) of space. Notable tenants include Kansas utility company Evergy.
2	Town Pavilion		1111 Main Street 39°06′02″N 94°34′57″W	591 (180.1)	38	1986	Office	Tallest building in Kansas City and Missouri from 1986 to 1988. Opened as the AT&T Town Pavilion. Since 2023, it is also known as 1111 Main.
3	Sheraton Kansas City Hotel at Crown Center		2345 McGee Street 39°05′07″N 94°34′47″W	504 (153.62)	45	1980	Hotel	Tallest hotel in Missouri. Formerly Hyatt Regency, now Sheraton, in the Crown Center District.
4	Kansas City Power and Light Building		1330 Baltimore Street 39°05′51″N 94°35′05″W	481 (146.6)	34	1931	Residential	Tallest building in Kansas City from 1931 to 1986. Tallest building completed in Kansas City in the 1930s. Originally and office building, it was converted into apartments from 2014 to 2016.
5	909 Walnut		909 Walnut Street 39°06′12″N 94°34′54″W	454 (138.3)	35	1931	Residential	Second tallest building in Kansas City at the time of completion. Formerly known as the Fidelity Bank & Trust Building and the Old Federal Office Building. Remained vacant from 1995 to 2000, after which it was converted to apartments in 2005.
6	Kansas City City Hall		414 East 12th Street 39°06′02″N 94°34′41″W	443 (135)	30	1937	Government	Tallest city hall in Missouri. Third tallest building in Kansas City at the time of completion. Third tallest city hall in the United States, after Philadelphia City Hall and Los Angeles City Hall.
7	1201 Walnut		1201 Walnut Street 39°05′58″N 94°34′55″W	425 (129.5)	30	1991	Office	Tallest building completed in Kansas City in the 1990s.
8	Commerce Tower		909 Main Street 39°06′11″N 94°34′58″W	407 (124.1)	32	1965	Residential	Formerly the headquarters of Commerce Bank. Tallest building completed in Kansas City in the 1960s. Converted to residential use from 2015 to 2016.
9	City Center Square		1100 Main Street 39°06′02″N 94°35′01″W	402 (122.5)	30	1977	Office	Tallest building completed in Kansas City in the 1970s. Renamed to the Lightwell Building in 2019.
10	Oak Tower		324 East 11th Street 39°06′04″N 94°34′44″W	379 (115.5)	28	1929	Office	Tallest building in Kansas City from 1929 to 1931. Tallest building completed in Kansas City in the 1920s. A major fiberoptic network hub for internet services.
11	2345 Grand		2345 Grand Avenue 39°05′06″N 94°34′52″W	352 (107.3)	28	1977	Office	
12	2555 Grand		2555 Grand Avenue 39°04′47″N 94°34′57″W	347 (105.8)	24	2003	Office	Tallest building in Kansas City completed in the 2000s.
13	Commerce Bank Building		920 Main Street 39°06′08″N 94°34′57″W	337 (102.7)	20	1985	Office	
14	AT&T Long Lines Building		1425 Oak Street 39°05′47″N 94°34′42″W	331 (101)	20	1973	Office	
15	Bryant Building		1100 Grand Avenue 39°06′03″N 94°34′52″W	318 (96.9)	26	1931	Office	
16	San Francisco Tower		2510 Grand Avenue 39°04′53″N 94°34′58″W	306 (93.3)	32	1976	Residential	Luxury condominiums in the Crown Center district.
17	Three Light	–	1477 Main Street 39°05′48″N 94°34′58″W	301 (91.6)	25	2023	Residential	Tallest building completed in Kansas City in the 2020s.
18	One Light		50 East 13th Street 39°05′56″N 94°34′57″W	300 (91.4)	25	2015	Residential	Tallest building completed in Kansas City in the 2010s.
19	Richard Bolling Federal Building		601 East 12th Street 39°05′56″N 94°34′35″W	299 (91)	18	1966	Office	
20	925 Grand		925 Grand Avenue 39°06′09″N 94°34′49″W	298 (90.8)	16	1921	Office	Tallest building in Kansas City from 1921 to 1929. Former headquarters of the Federal Reserve Bank of Kansas City, who moved out in 2008. Designed by designed by Chicago architectural firm Graham, Anderson, Probst & White. The building is currently vacant.
21	Crowne Plaza Kansas City Downtown		1301 Wyandotte Street 39°05′54″N 94°35′07″W	298 (90.8)	28	1968	Hotel	Formerly a Radisson Hotel & Suites.
22	Jackson County Courthouse		415 East 12th Street 39°05′57″N 94°34′41″W	295 (89.9)	15	1934	Government	Designed by Wight and Wight in an Art Deco style. Then presiding judge of Jackson County Court and later U.S. president Harry S. Truman, wanted it designed similar to the Caddo Parish, Louisiana courthouse in Shreveport.
23	Charles Evans Whittaker Federal Courthouse		400 East 9th Street 39°06′15″N 94°34′40″W	290 (88.4)	10	2000	Government	Named after Charles Evans Whittaker, an Associate Justice of the United States Supreme Court from 1957 to 1962 who studied law in Kansas City.
24	Wallstreet Tower		1101 West 11th Street 39°06′03″N 94°34′54″W	288 (87.8)	20	1974	Residential	Also known as the Mercantile Bank & Trust Building. Originally an office building, it was converted to residential use in 2011.
25	H&R Block World Headquarters		One H&R Block Way 39°05′53″N 94°34′59″W	287 (87.5)	18	2006	Office	Sparked the revitalization of the now popular Power & Light District in the mid-2000s.
26	Mark Twain Tower		106 West 11th Street 39°06′04″N 94°35′05″W	282 (86)	22	1923	Office	Was home to a branch of the Playboy Club in the 1960s. Formerly known as the Continental Hotel; renamed the Mark Twain Tower in 1982. Originally a hotel, then an office building, it was converted to residential use from 2019 to 2022.
27	Loews Kansas City Hotel		1515 Wyandotte Street 39°05′45″N 94°35′06″W	279 (85.1)	23	2020	Hotel	Convention space and luxury hotel with a restaurant and bar overlooking downtown Kansas City.
28	The Grand		1125 Grand Boulevard 39°06′00″N 94°34′50″W	277 (84.5)	21	1963	Residential	Also known as Traders On Grand. First high-rise building erected in downtown Kansas City after the Great Depression. Originally an office building, it was converted to residential use in the 2010s, with a new Grand signage.
29	12 Wyandotte Plaza		12 Wyandotte Street 39°06′01″N 94°35′07″W	274 (84) (Note: Sources do not state the exact height of this building. This figure was determined using Google Earth by subtracting the altitude of the building's lowest main pedestrian open-air entrance from its highest architectural point.)	18	1986	Office	Built as part of a master plan anchored by One Kansas City Place.
30	BMA Tower		700 West 31st Street 39°04′20″N 94°35′37″W	273 (83.2)	19	1963	Residential	Also known as One Park Place.
31	Ten Main Center		920 Main Street 39°06′10″N 94°35′00″W	272 (82.9)	20	1968	Office	Former headquarters of AMC Theatres. AMC left in 2015.
32	Two Light Tower		1444 Grand Boulevard 39°05′48″N 94°34′54″W	272 (82.9)	24	2018	Residential	
33	Kansas City Marriott Downtown		200 West 12th Street 39°06′02″N 94°35′11″W	259 (79)	22	1985	Hotel	Situated in the Convention District, near Barney Allis Plaza and Municipal Auditorium.
34	Commerce Trust Building		922 Walnut Street 39°06′09″N 94°34′56″W	258 (78.6)	15	1907	Office	First building in Kansas City to be taller than 200 ft (61 m). Tallest building in Kansas City from 1907 to 1921. Tallest building in completed in Kansas City in the 1900s.
35	1 Memorial Drive		1 Memorial Drive 39°04′33″N 94°35′09″W	250 (76.2)	14	2008	Office	Home to the Federal Reserve Bank of Kansas City, which relocated from 925 Grand, and also the Money Museum; situated on Union Hill. Hence also called the Federal Reserve Bank Building.
36	1400KC	–	1400 Baltimore Avenue 39°05′49″N 94°35′06″W	244 (74.4)	18	2022	Office	
37	Hotel Phillips		106 West 12th Street 39°06′01″N 94°35′05″W	243 (74)	20	1931	Hotel	
38	Alameda Tower	–	400 West 49th Terrace 39°02′19″N 94°35′34″W	242 (74)	21	1989	Residential	
39	American Century Towers I		4500 Main Street 39°02′45″N 94°35′15″W	236 (72)	15	1991	Office	Overlooks the Plaza and J.C. Nichols Fountain. Often illuminated and visible from Midtown or Westport.
40	American Century Towers II		4500 Main Street 39°02′43″N 94°35′15″W	236 (72)	15	1991	Office	Overlooks the Plaza and J.C. Nichols Fountain. Often illuminated and visible from Midtown or Westport.
41	2405 Grand	–	2405 Grand Boulevard 39°05′00″N 94°34′53″W	232 (71)	14	1986	Office	
42	The Westin Kansas City at Crown Center		1 East Pershing Road 39°04′59″N 94°34′59″W	229 (70)	21	1973	Hotel	
43	Grand Boulevard Lofts		1006 Grand Boulevard 39°06′07″N 94°34′52″W	229 (69.8)	17	1930	Residential	Formerly an office building known as the Home Savings Association Building, it was converted to affordable housing in 2010.
44	Kansas City Marriott Country Club Plaza		4445 Main Street 39°02′45″N 94°35′10″W	229 (69.8)	18	1986	Hotel	
45	Plaza West		4600 Madison Avenue 39°02′40″N 94°35′53″W	225 (68.5)	17	1986	Office	
46	The Sulgrave	–	121 West 48th Street 39°02′20″N 94°35′21″W	218 (66)	21	1967	Residential	
47	Kansas City Club Building		128 West 13th Street 39°05′56″N 94°35′05″W	217 (66.1)	14	1922	Residential	
48	46 Penn Centre	–	4622 Pennsylvania Avenue 39°02′35″N 94°35′38″W	210 (64)	14	2020	Office	
49	The View	–	600 Admiral Boulevard 39°06′20″N 94°34′33″W	209 (63.7)	20	1968	Residential	
50	21 Ten Lofts	–	21 West 10th Street 39°06′07″N 94°35′03″W	208 (63.3)	15	1914	Residential	
51	R.A. Long Building		928 Grand Boulevard 39°06′09″N 94°34′52″W	207 (63.1)	16	1907	Office	Also known as the UMB Building.
52	Professional Building		213 East 11th Street 39°06′03″N 94°34′50″W	207 (63)	16	1929	Residential	Originally an office building, it was converted to 132 affordable housing units in 2006.

=== Kansas City metropolitan area ===
Kansas City metropolitan area
- Population: 2,253,579 (2024 estimate)
- Cities included: Kansas City, Missouri; Overland Park

Number of tall buildings (2026)
- Taller than 100 m (328 ft): 14
- Taller than 150 m (492 ft): 2

Number of tall buildings — feet
- Taller than 200 ft (61.0 m): 56
- Taller than 300 ft (91.4 m): 18

There are several buildings in the Kansas City metropolitan area located outside of Kansas City, Missouri that are taller than 200 ft (61 m). All of them are located in Overland Park, Kansas.

Rank	Name	Image	City	Height ft (m)	Floors	Year	Purpose	Notes
1	Lighton Plaza	–	Overland Park 38°55′45″N 94°40′24″W	247 (75)	15	1991	Office	Tallest building in Overland Park.
2	40 Corporate Woods		Overland Park 38°55′53″N 94°41′42″W	220 (67)	16	1980	Office	
3	7101 Tower	–	Overland Park 38°55′34″N 94°40′08″W	217 (66)	15	1986	Office	
4	Sheraton Overland Park Hotel at the Convention Center		Overland Park 38°55′42″N 94°39′24″W	208 (63)	22	2003	Hotel	

== Tallest under construction or proposed ==
=== Under construction ===
As of 2026, there are no buildings under construction in Kansas City that are confirmed to be taller than 200 ft (61 m).

=== Proposed ===
The following table includes approved and proposed buildings in Kansas City that are expected to be at least 200 ft (61 m) tall as of 2026, based on standard height measurement. The “Year” column indicates the expected year of completion. A dash “–“ indicates information about the building's height, floor count, or year of completion is unknown or has not been released.

Name	Height ft (m)	Floors	Year	Purpose	Status	Notes
800 Grand	385 (117)	25	–	Residential	Approved	
Four Light	–	25	–	Residential	Approved	

== Tallest demolished ==
This table lists buildings that once stood taller than 200 ft (61 m) in Kansas City that have been demolished.

Name	Image	Height ft (m)	Floors	Year completed	Year demolished	Purpose	Notes
Waldheim Building		213 (65)	16	1910	1986	Office	

== Timeline of tallest buildings ==
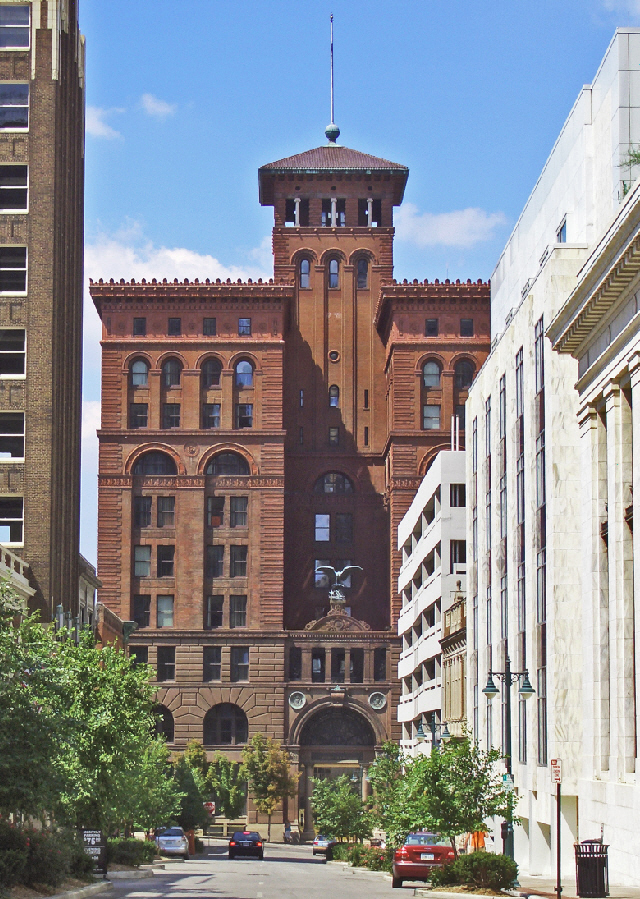
The New York Life Insurance Building, completed in 1890, is the first multi-story high-rise building in Kansas City.

These buildings once held the title of tallest building in Kansas City, Missouri.

Name	Image	Street address	Years as tallest	Height ft (m)	Floors	Reference
New York Life Insurance Building		20 West Ninth Street	1890–1906	180 (54.8)	12	
Commerce Trust Building		922 Walnut Street	1906–1921	258 (78.6)	17	
925 Grand		925 Grand Avenue	1921–1929	298 (90.8)	16	
Oak Tower		324 East 11th Street	1929–1931	379 (115.5)	28	
Kansas City Power and Light Building		1330 Baltimore Street	1931–1986	481 (146.6)	34	
Town Pavilion		1111 Main Street	1986–1988	591 (180.1)	38	
One Kansas City Place		1200 Main Street	1988–present	623 (189.9)	42	

== See also ==
- List of tallest buildings in Missouri
- List of tallest buildings in St. Louis
- Architecture in Kansas City
