= Financial District (Kansas City, Missouri) =

Neighborhood in the center of Downtown Kansas City

Coordinates: 39°06′00″N 94°35′00″W

The Financial District of Kansas City, Missouri is a neighborhood in the center of Downtown Kansas City. It is bordered roughly by Ninth Street to the north, Oak Street to the east, Baltimore Avenue to the west, and Interstate 670 (Kansas-Missouri) to the south. The neighborhood includes many of the city's largest offices, and headquarters of much of Kansas City's major financial institutions.

The neighborhood is rich in diverse architecture, spanning from historic nineteenth century highrises and classic Art Deco structures such as the Kansas City Power and Light Building, to international, modernist, and postmodern architecture. Many of Kansas City's tallest skyscrapers dominate the area, all with Class A office space, such as One Kansas City Place (Missouri's tallest habitable building), City Center Square, Town Pavilion, and 1201 Walnut. Many of the buildings have light features that illuminate the city's towers at night, contributing to the uniqueness of Kansas City's skyline.

Previously, the neighborhood was considered to be primarily a destination for daytime traders and office workers from in and around the Kansas City Metropolitan Area. The neighborhood now has a growing number of full-time residents, with estimates made in 2008 showing that there were approximately 16,000 people living in the area, a jump from the ten thousand living there in 2000. Many of the neighborhood's older highrises have been renovated into lofts and condominiums, catering to young professionals living and working in the city.
