= 1201 Walnut =

Office skyscraper in Kansas City, Missouri

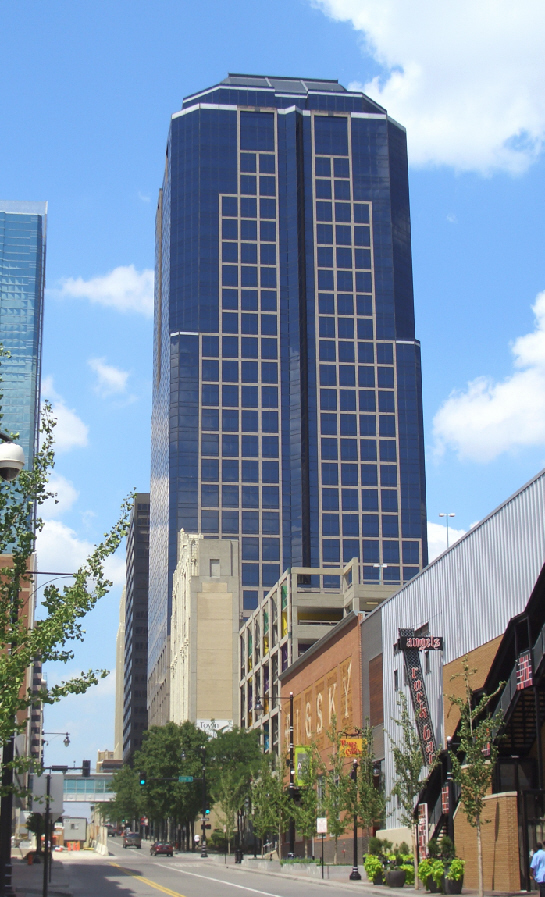
- Interactive map of the 1201 Walnut area

General information
- Status: Completed
- Type: Office
- Location: 1201 Walnut Street, Kansas City, Missouri, U.S.
- Coordinates: 39.09956°N 94.58194°W
- Construction started: 1988
- Completed: 1991
- Owner: Copaken, White & Blitt

Height
- Roof: 130.1 m (427 ft)

Technical details
- Floor count: 30
- Floor area: 44,593 m^{2} (480,000 sq ft)
- Lifts/elevators: 13

Design and construction
- Architect: HNTB

The 1201 Walnut Building is a skyscraper located in Downtown Kansas City, Missouri, US, built by HNTB Architects in 1991. It is located at the southeast corner of 12th and Walnut streets, one block North of the Power & Light District and one intersection East of One Kansas City Place. At 427 feet, it is the eighth tallest habitable structure in the Kansas City Metropolitan Area and the twelfth-tallest habitable structure in Missouri. The exterior is made of mostly dark-colored glass with granite panels. In late 2010, building tenant Stinson Leonard Street, LLP, acquired the rights to place a large sign and corporate logo atop the southern face of the building.

== See also ==
- List of tallest buildings in Kansas City, Missouri
