= Kansas City Club Building =

Coordinates: 39.098832°N 94.584768°W

- U.S. National Register of Historic Places
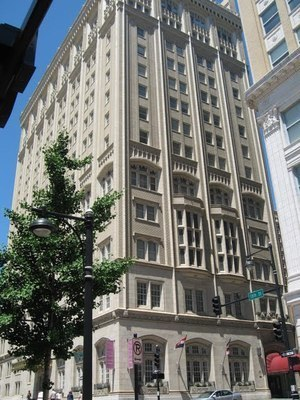
- The Kansas City Club Building
- Location: 1228 Baltimore Ave., Kansas City, Missouri
- Area: less than one acre
- Built: 1918-1922
- Architect: Smith, Rea and Lovitt
- Architectural style: Late Gothic Revival
- NRHP reference No.: 02001401
- Added to NRHP: November 19, 2002

The Kansas City Club Building is a 14-story building in downtown Kansas City, Missouri, built from 1918 to 1922. It has been listed on the National Register of Historic Places since 2002.

It was built as the clubhouse of the Kansas City Club, a private club. It remained the clubhouse until 2001, when the club merged with a nearby smaller club. In 2002, a developer bought and renovated the building. The first six floors were a banquet facility called The Clubhouse on Baltimore. The remaining nine floors were converted to loft apartments called The Clubhouse Lofts.

In 2020 it was converted to the Hotel Kansas City.
