= Commerce Trust Building =

Office skyscraper in Kansas City, Missouri

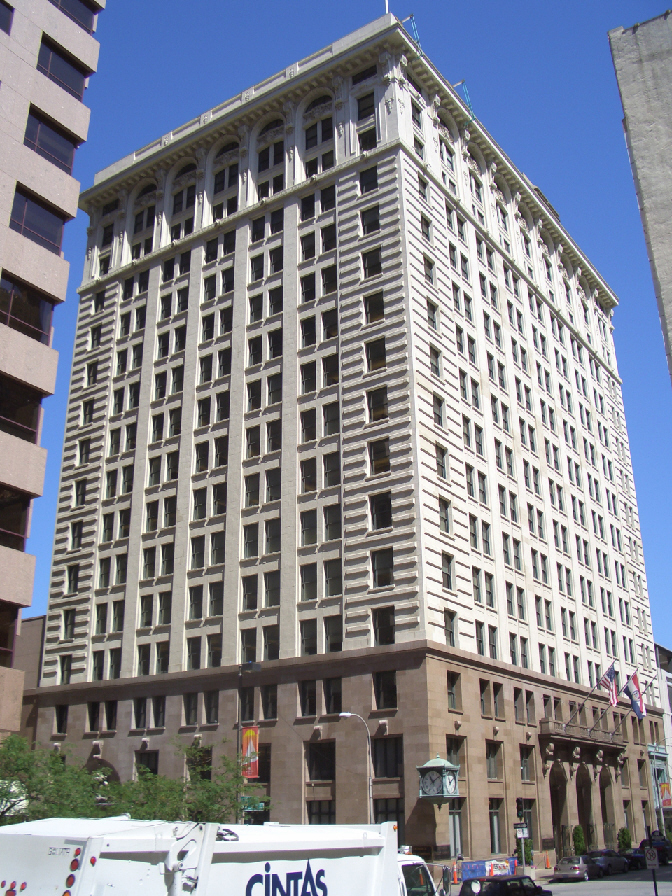
- Interactive map of the Commerce Trust Building area

General information
- Status: Completed
- Type: Commercial offices
- Location: 922 Walnut, Kansas City, Missouri
- Coordinates: 39.1026°N 94.5824°W
- Completed: 1907
- Owner: Tower Properties

Height
- Roof: 78.6 m (258 ft)

Technical details
- Floor count: 15
- Floor area: 24,154 m^{2} (259,990 sq ft)

Design and construction
- Architect: Jarvis Hunt
- Main contractor: George A. Fuller Company

Commerce Trust Building is a 15-story tower built for Kansas City Missouri's biggest bank Commerce Bancshares in 1907, and was Kansas City's second skyscraper following the New York Life building.

It has a facade of red granite and white terra cotta tiles and was Missouri's tallest building when it opened.

Formerly, the site was the home of the Kansas City Journal, which in turn was taken over by Commerce. Harry Truman worked in the predecessor building.

Its architect, Jarvis Hunt, also designed Union Station and the headquarters of the Kansas City Star. The construction company was the George A. Fuller Company which built the Flatiron Building in the New York City and as a company continues to build major skyscrapers around the world.

In 1965, Commerce built a larger adjoining building Commerce Tower but has continued to use the original building.

In 2004, Commerce Bancshares conducted a $48 million renovation of the building expanding its square footage to 300,000 square feet (28,000 m^{2}) by filling in the light court between the fourth and 15th floors.

Part of the renovation also included illuminating the lobby's ornate glass ceiling to replicate natural sunlight.

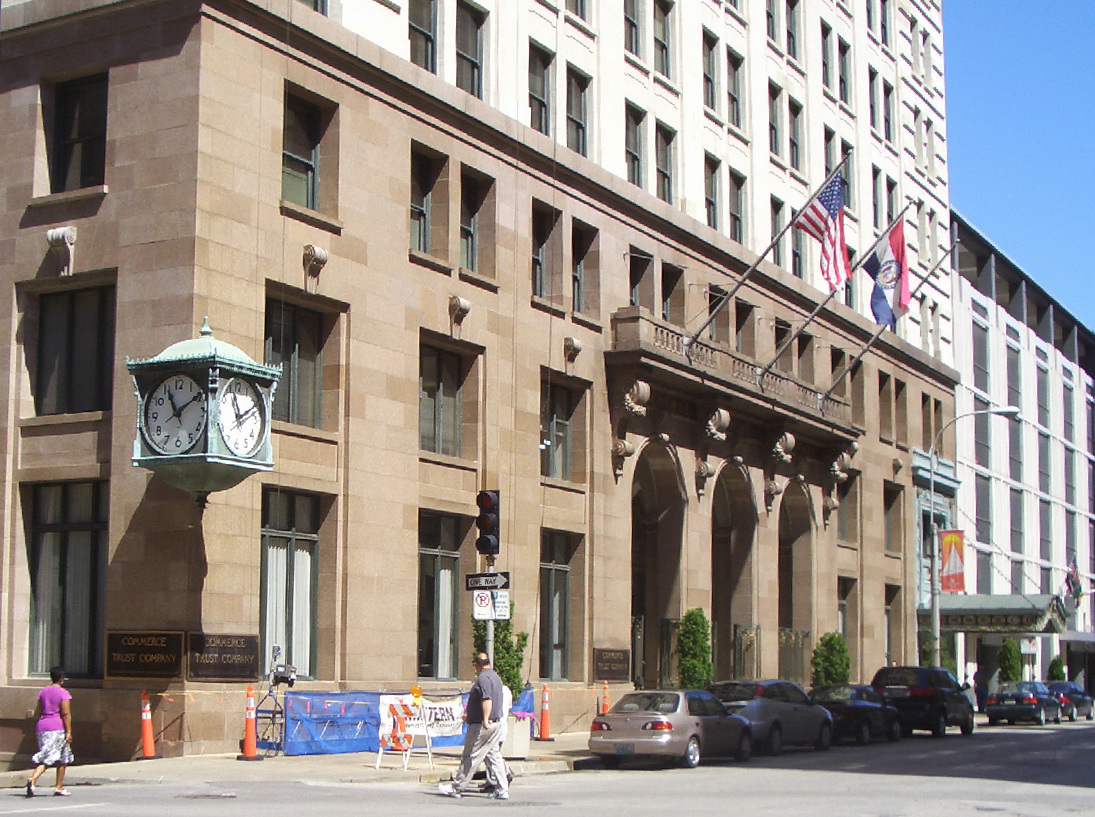
Street level entrance, with landmark clock and porte-cochère entry on the far right.
