= Bryant Building (Kansas City, Missouri) =

Historic building in Missouri, United States

- U.S. National Register of Historic Places
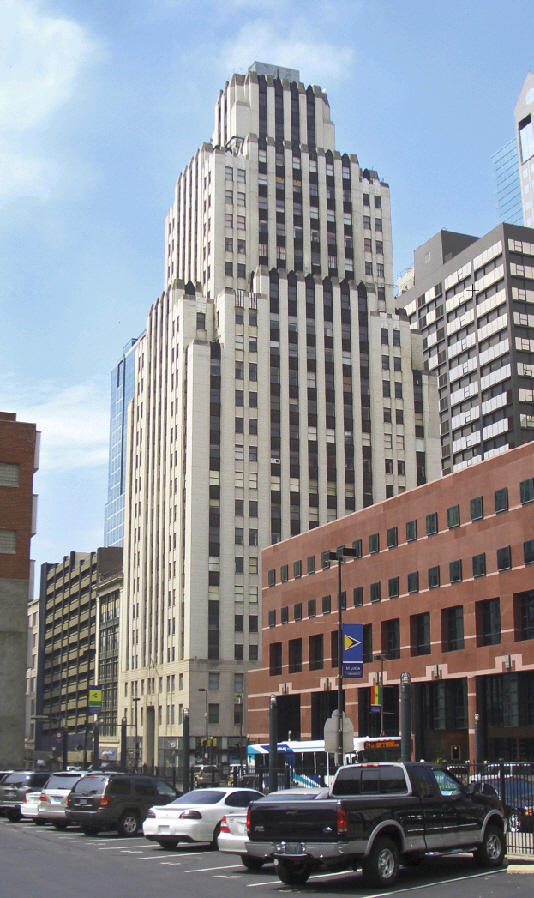

- Location within Missouri Location within the United States
- Location: 1102 Grand Ave., Kansas City, Missouri
- Coordinates: 39°06′2.91″N 94°34′51.77″W
- Area: less than one acre
- Built: 1931
- Built by: Graham, Anderson, Probst and White
- Architectural style: Art Deco
- NRHP reference No.: 89000312
- Added to NRHP: April 24, 1989

The Bryant Building is a 26-story office building located at the corner of 11th and Grand Avenue in Kansas City, Missouri. It was completed in 1931 as a distinctive example of Art Deco architecture in Kansas City. It was placed on the Kansas City Register of Historic Places listed on September 27, 1979, and was listed on the National Register of Historic Places in 1989.

== History ==
=== 1891 original ===
Dr. John Bryant and his wife, Henrietta, had received this land as a wedding gift from her father in 1866. The original seven-story Bryant Building was built in 1891 at the corner of Petticoat Lane and Grand Boulevard, designed by Van Brunt and Howe of Kansas City. It was highlighted in Architectural Review as "one of the best lighted and ventilated office buildings in" the city. It was razed in 1931 and rebuilt as the current building.

=== 1931 replacement ===
The Bryant Building was designed by the Chicago firm of Graham, Anderson, Probst & White. The design is an adaptation of the second-place winner of the 1922 Eliel Saarinen's Tribune Tower design competition. It is one of only two buildings in Kansas City designed by Graham, Anderson, Probst, and White—along with the former Federal Reserve Bank building at 925 Grand. Construction lasted from 1930 to 1931, which newspapers dubbed "Bryant tower". It has a three-story granite base, concrete foundation, steel frame, and a face of brick and terra cotta. The builder was Thompson–Starrett Co. of Chicago. The heirs of John and Henrietta Bryant placed family records into the cornerstone.

In 2006, the building was renamed 1102 Grand with a new role as a carrier hotel style of data center, and a $7 million renovation project to improve power and cooling systems. The building was acquired in 2012 by Amerimar Enterprises, Inc, which later re-branded to Netrality Properties and then Netrality Data Centers, in 2015.

In 2020, Netrality Data Centers announced the completion of a 14-month renovation and infrastructure upgrade to the building's primary and backup power capacity, with additional meet-me rooms, floor cage space, co-location cabinets, and three new lithium-ion uninterruptible power supplies on the 7th and 8th floors.

== Reception ==
The Bryant Building won the Kansas City Business League and the local American Institute of Architects Chapter awards in 1931.
