= 925 Grand =

Former headquarters of the Federal Reserve Bank of Kansas City

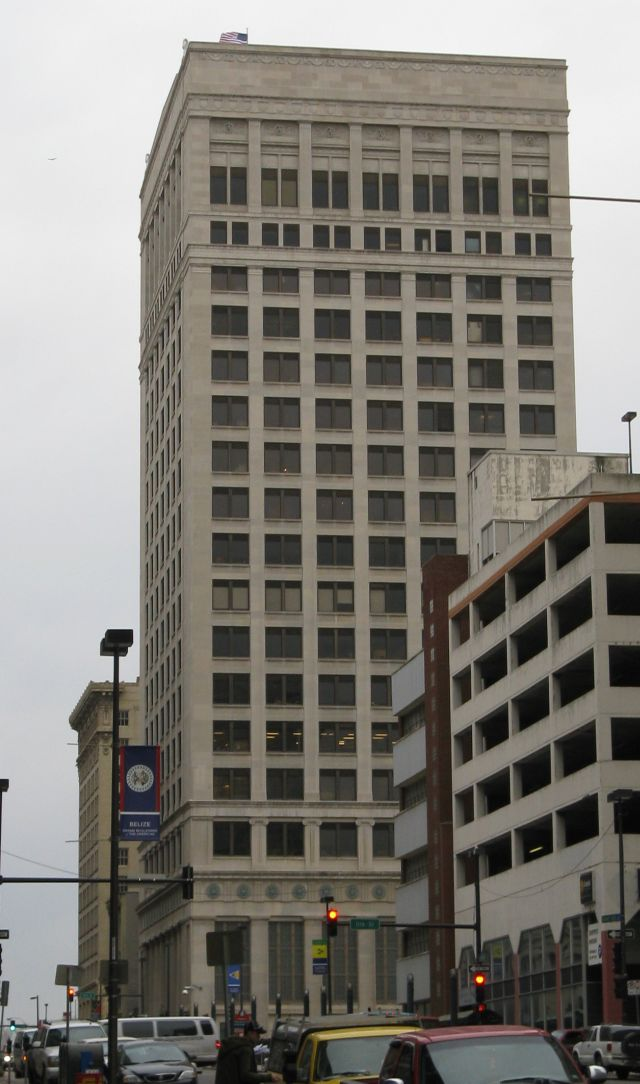
- Alternative names: The Reserve; Federal Reserve Bank of Kansas City

General information
- Type: Commercial offices Residential
- Location: 925 Grand; Kansas City, Missouri
- Coordinates: 39.1026°N 94.5806°W
- Opening: 1921
- Cost: US$4.3 million
- Owner: Great Western Bank of Sioux Falls, S.D.

Height
- Antenna spire: 92.0 m (301.8 ft)
- Roof: 90.8 m (298 ft)

Technical details
- Floor count: 16
- Floor area: 367,000 sq ft (34,100 m^{2}).

Design and construction
- Architects: Graham, Anderson, Probst & White (original), Focus Architecture, LLC (current)
- Federal Reserve Bank of Kansas City
- U.S. National Register of Historic Places
- Location within Missouri
- Location: 925 Grand Blvd., Kansas City, Missouri
- Coordinates: 39°06′16″N 94°34′50″W
- Area: less than one acre
- Built: 1921
- Architect: Graham, Anderson, Probst & White; Kivett & Myers
- Architectural style: Classical Revival
- NRHP reference No.: 07000327
- Added to NRHP: April 10, 2007

925 Grand is the former headquarters of the Federal Reserve Bank of Kansas City (Kansas City Fed). It was the oldest Federal Reserve Bank building in active use until 2008, when the Kansas City Fed moved out. It was added to the National Register of Historic Places in 2007.

In 1913 Kansas City and St. Louis had a fierce rivalry over which city was to get a Federal Reserve bank, but in the end, both cities received one. (Missouri is the only state to have multiple Federal Reserve banks. Among the reasons noted for the award is that former Kansas City mayor James A. Reed, who was on the Senate Banking Committee, broke the deadlock to permit passage of the Federal Reserve Act.)

The first Kansas City Fed building was in the R.A. Long Building at 928 Grand, which opened on November 16, 1914, until a new $4.3 million building could be built across the street at 925 Grand, which formally opened in November 1921 in Downtown Kansas City. Shortly after it was established the Kansas City Fed rented space to outside tenants.

The building was designed by Chicago architectural firm Graham, Anderson, Probst & White, who also designed the Federal Reserve Bank of Chicago and the Wrigley Building, among other landmarks. 925 Grand was Missouri's tallest building from 1921 to 1926 and Kansas City's tallest building from 1921 to 1929.

President Harry S. Truman had his office in Room 1107 of the building from when he left the Presidency in 1953 until the Truman Library was completed in 1957.

In 2008, the Kansas City Fed moved to a new building off of Main Street by the Liberty Memorial designed by architect Henry N. Cobb. Townsend, Inc. of Overland Park, Kansas, bought the building for $10.8 million in 2005 and the Kansas City Fed continued as a tenant until its new headquarters opened in 2008. In 2013, Townsend lost the building when its lender, Great Western Bank of Sioux Falls, South Dakota, took back the property at courthouse auction. A Boston lender is providing funding to a new developer who plans to convert the building into a hotel.

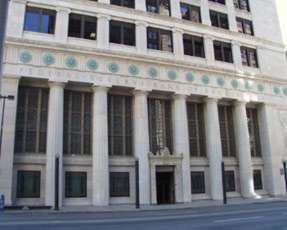
Main entrance

== See also ==
- Tallest buildings in Kansas City
- National Register of Historic Places listings in Downtown Kansas City
