= Professional Building (Kansas City, Missouri) =

- U.S. National Register of Historic Places
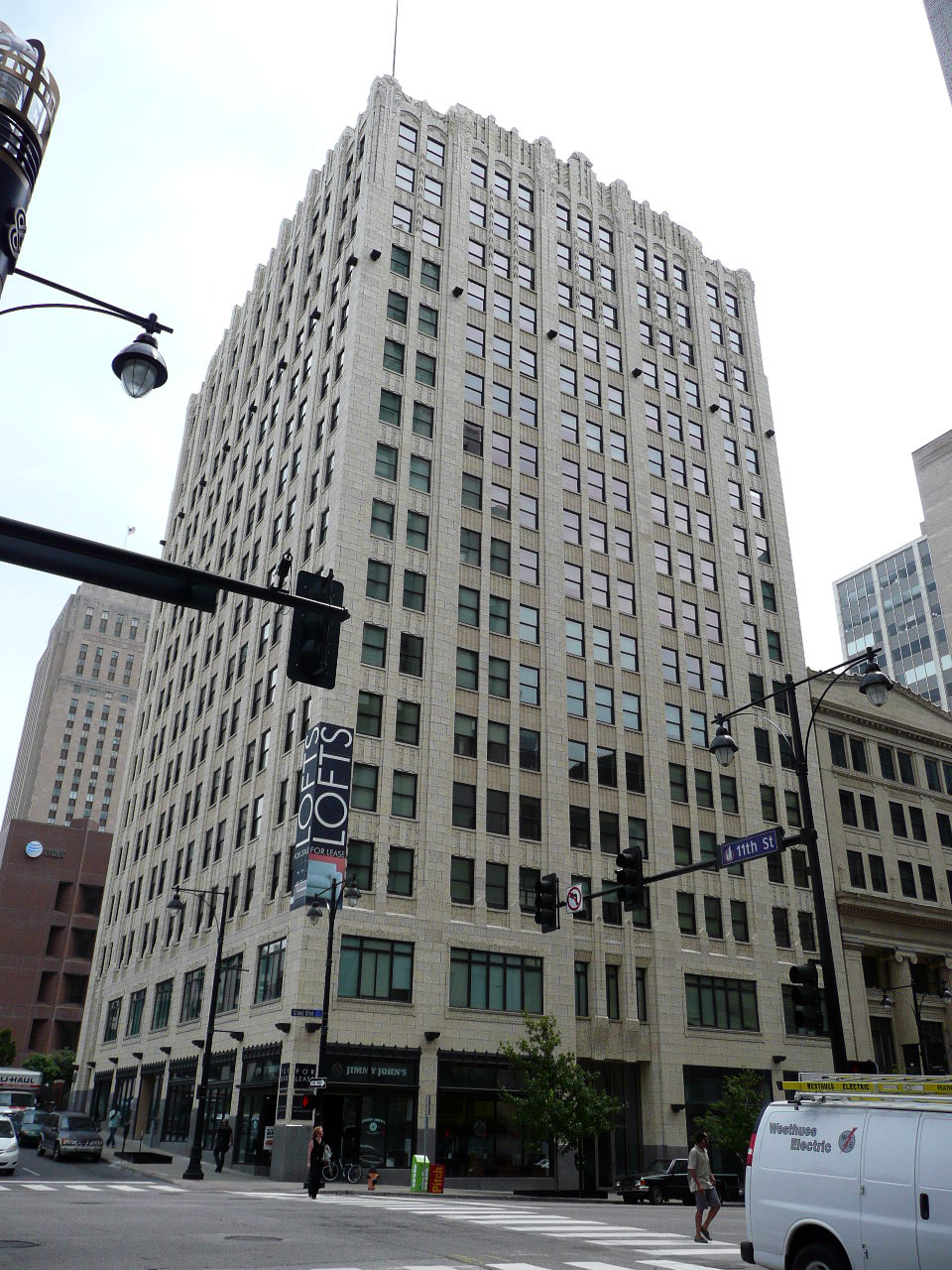

- Location within Missouri Location within the United States
- Location: 1101--1107 Grand Ave., Kansas City, Missouri
- Coordinates: 39°6′3″N 94°34′49″W
- Area: less than one acre
- Built: 1929
- Architect: Smith, Charles A.; McIntyre, George E.
- Architectural style: Moderne
- NRHP reference No.: 79001373
- Added to NRHP: July 17, 1979

The Professional Building in Kansas City, Missouri is a building from 1929. It was listed on the National Register of Historic Places in 1982.
