= Jackson County Courthouse (Kansas City, Missouri) =

Court house in Kansas City, Missouri, U.S.

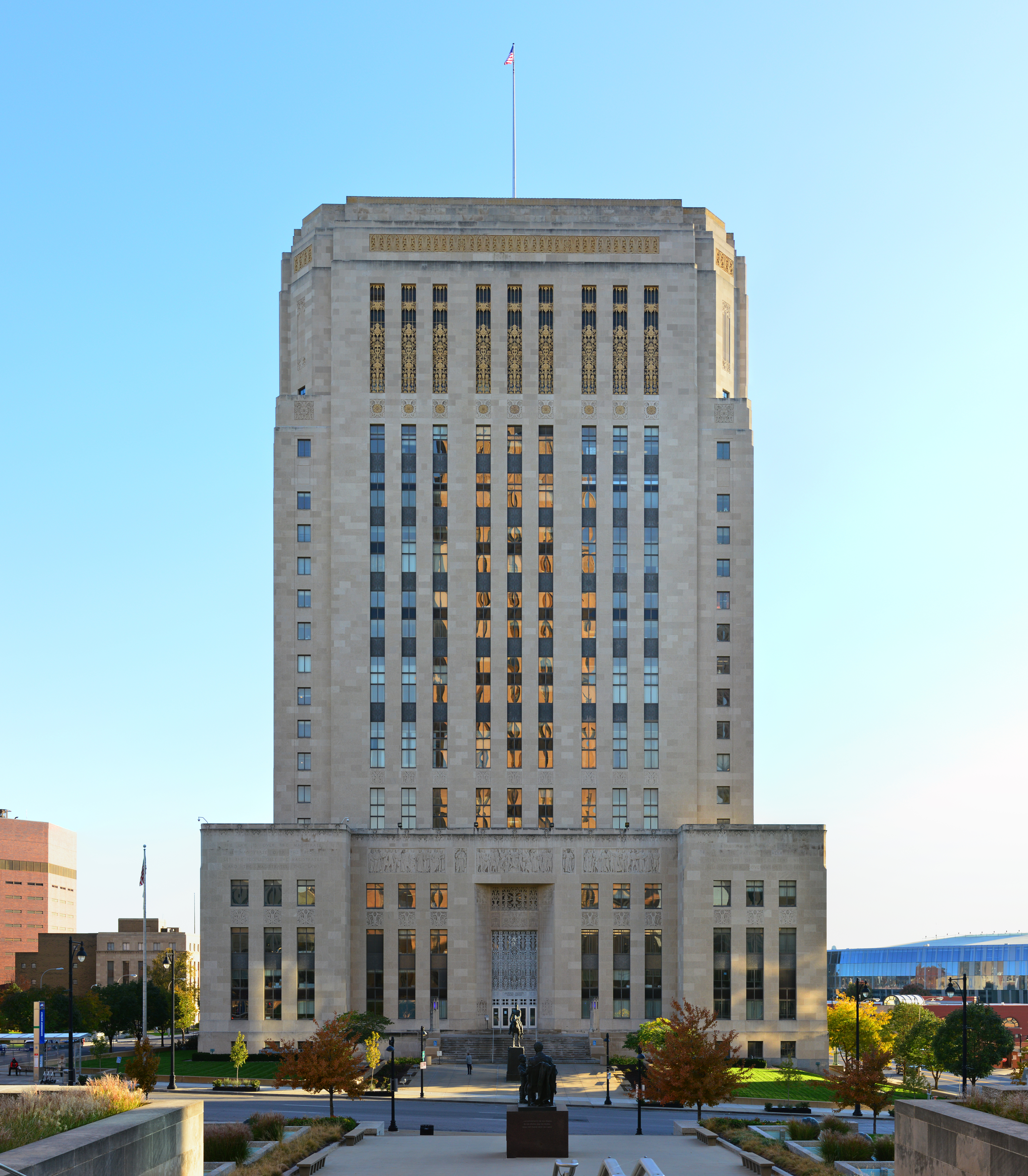
- Jackson County Courthouse in 2019

General information
- Type: Courthouse
- Architectural style: Art Deco
- Location: 415 East 12th Street, Kansas City, Missouri, United States
- Coordinates: 39.0992°N 94.5780°W
- Construction started: 1933
- Completed: 1934
- Inaugurated: December 27, 1934
- Cost: $4,000,000
- Owner: Jackson County

Height
- Height: 295 feet (90 m)

Technical details
- Floor count: 22

Design and construction
- Architect: Frederick C. Gunn
- Architecture firm: Wight & Wight; Keene & Simpson; Edward F. Neild

Jackson County Courthouse is a courthouse in Kansas City, Missouri, United States. It houses judicial and administrative offices for the western portion of Jackson County, Missouri.

It was built in 1934, designed by Wight and Wight in an Art Deco style. Harry S. Truman, presiding judge of the Jackson County Court at the time, wanted it designed similar to the Caddo Parish, Louisiana courthouse in Shreveport, Louisiana by Edward F. Neild. The latter architect was hired as consulting architect-engineer. Neild was later commissioned to design the Truman Presidential Library, but died before it was completed.

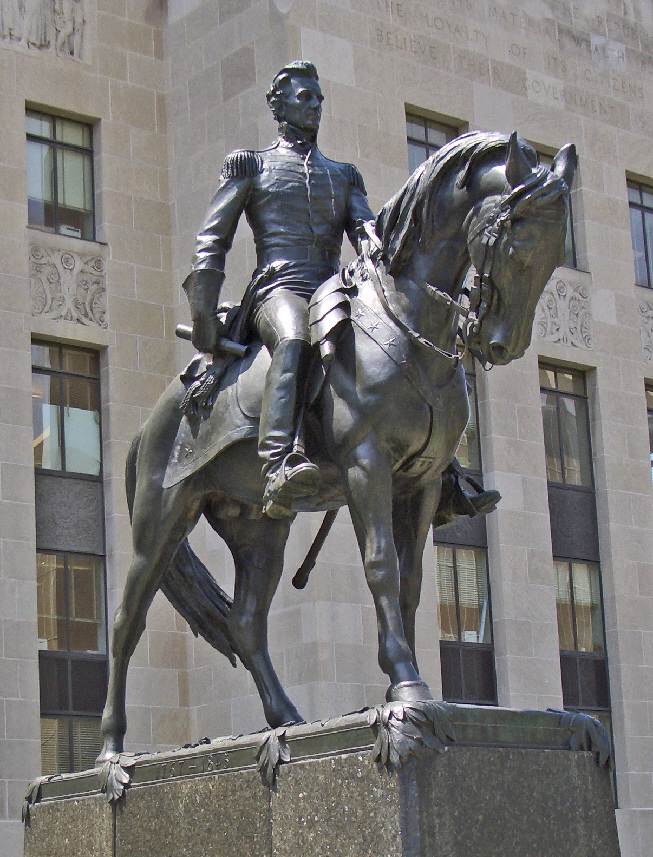
Statue of Andrew Jackson at the 12th Street entrance of the Jackson County courthouse.

== History ==
In 1872, an unfinished hotel building located at 2nd and Main St was adapted by Asa Beebe Cross for use as the Jackson County Courthouse.

In 1922, Harry S. Truman won election as county judge for eastern Jackson County as a candidate of the Tom Pendergast faction of the Democratic Party. He failed to be re-elected in 1924, but won election as presiding judge in 1926. Truman served in this position, in effect as county commissioner, for eight years. He divided his time between this courthouse and the eastern courthouse in Independence.

=== Current courthouse ===
This building replaced the previous Kansas City courthouse annex at 5th and Oak, which officials deemed unsafe. Voters approved a $4 million bond issue in 1931 for construction of the courthouse and adjacent Kansas City City Hall; the structure was dedicated in December 1934. Truman maintained an office in the new courthouse building during most of his first term as U.S. Senator, from 1935 to 1939.

The courthouse contains an elaborate painted ceiling on the second floor featuring portraits of county employees. The mural was completed by artist Chris Doyle in 2006. In the lobby are five medallions representing Faith, Authority, Justice, Aspiration, and Progress, sculpted in white and bronze by Kansas City sculptor Jorgen Dreyer.
