= 2345 Grand =

Office skyscraper in Kansas City, Missouri

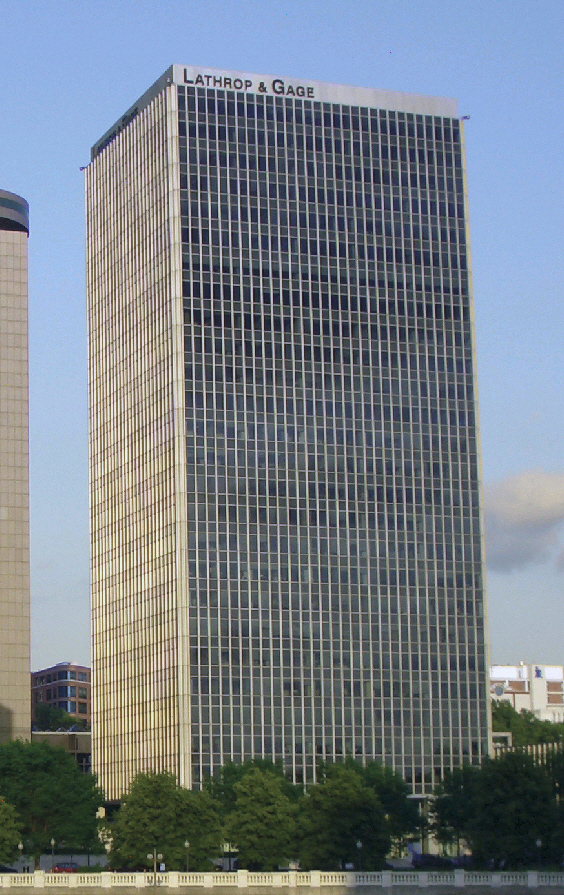
- Interactive map of the 2345 Grand area

General information
- Status: Completed
- Type: Office
- Location: 2345 Grand, Kansas City, Missouri
- Coordinates: 39.085015°N 94.581216°W
- Opening: 1977
- Owner: Franklin Street Properties Corp

Height
- Roof: 352 ft (107 m)

Technical details
- Floor count: 28
- Floor area: 606,400 square feet (56,340 m^{2})

Design and construction
- Architects: Fujikawa Conterato Lohan & Associates

2345 Grand (formerly the IBM Plaza, IBM Building and Mutual Benefit Life Insurance Company Building) is a high-rise office building located in Kansas City, Missouri. It is listed on many sites as being the work of Mies van der Rohe; however, he died in 1969 before the building could be opened in 1977. The work was done by Fujikawa Conterato Lohan & Associates.

The building was originally built to be both the western headquarters of now defunct Mutual Benefit Life Insurance Company and an IBM office. At the time, it was called both the Mutual Benefit Building and the IBM Building.

It was acquired by Shorenstein Properties, who sold the building for $49.5 million in 2004 to Hines Interests Limited Partnership and GE Real Estate. In turn, they sold the structure for $75 million to Franklin Street Properties Corp in December 2007.

The current principal tenant in the building is the law firm of Lathrop & Gage, which occupies nine floors of the building. It also houses Missouri's Federal Immigration Court.
