= Commerce Tower =

Office skyscraper in Kansas City, Missouri

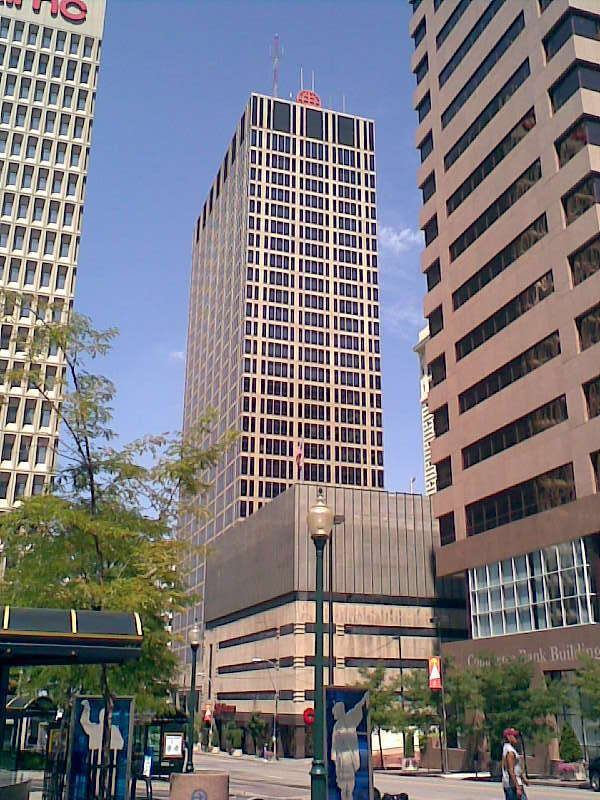
- Interactive map of the Commerce Tower area

General information
- Status: Completed
- Type: Office
- Location: 911 Main Street, Kansas City, Missouri, U.S.
- Coordinates: 39.103307°N 94.582868°W
- Completed: 1965
- Owner: Commerce Tower Group, LLC

Height
- Roof: 128.3 m (421 ft)

Technical details
- Floor count: 32
- Floor area: 40,698 m^{2} (438,070 sq ft)

Design and construction
- Architect: Keene & Simpson & Murphy

Commerce Tower is a 30-story skyscraper located in Downtown Kansas City, Missouri, US. Constructed in 1965, it is the ninth-tallest habitable structure in the Kansas City Metropolitan Area, and since the completion of the City Hall, it was the first locally designed Skyscraper in Kansas City. The building was designed by architects Keene & Simpson & Murphy, who moved their offices into the building after it was completed. The facade is constructed of pre-cast stone and glass, (known as a "curtain-wall") creating a unique look, especially for its time. When it opened, its top two floors were home to the Top of the Tower restaurant, which served five varieties of ethnic cuisine in separate dining areas decorated to match the food served there.

The last 15-foot beam was signed by 18,000 people including Harry S Truman.

Commerce Tower is no longer occupied by its namesake, Commerce Bancshares. Commerce Bank moved its headquarters to 1000 Walnut Street in 1985. It is also home to the downtown campus of Park University. The building is expected to change ownership in 2013 and be redeveloped into a $90 million mix of office, residential, and educational uses—due, in part, to construction of the KC Streetcar right outside the building's main entrance.
