= Downtown Kansas City =

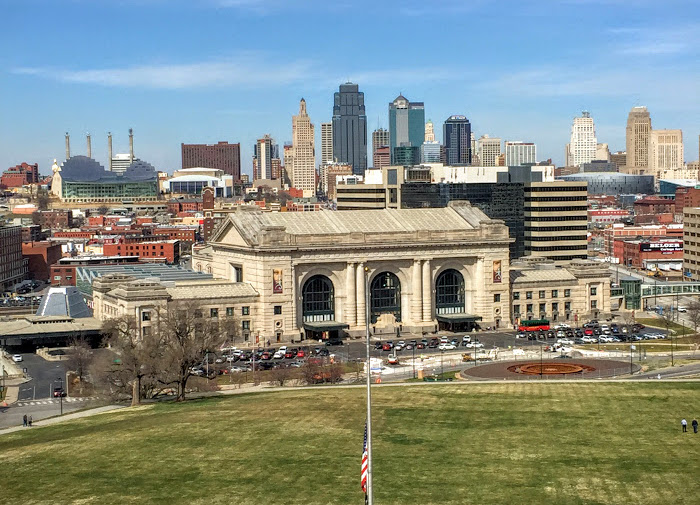
- The downtown Kansas City skyline
- Interactive map of Downtown Kansas City
- Coordinates: 39°06′00″N 94°35′04″W
- Country: United States
- State: Missouri
- Counties: Jackson
- City: Kansas City

Area
  - Total: 6.23 sq mi (16.14 km^{2})
  - Land: 6.23 sq mi (16.14 km^{2})
  - Water: 0 sq mi (0 km^{2}) 0%
- Elevation: 800 ft (240 m)

Population (2021)
  - Total: 31,229
  - Density: 5,010/sq mi (1,935/km^{2})
- ZIP codes: 64101, 64102, 64105, 64106, 64108, and 64109
- Area code: 816
- Website: https://downtownkc.org

Downtown Kansas City is the largest central business district (CBD) in the city of Kansas City, Missouri, and the Kansas City metropolitan area which contains 3.8% of the area's employment. It is between the Missouri River in the north, to 31st Street in the south; and from the Kansas–Missouri state line eastward to Bruce R. Watkins Drive as defined by the Downtown Council of Kansas City; the 2010 Greater Downtown Area Plan formulated by the City of Kansas City defines the Greater Downtown Area to be the city limits of North Kansas City and Missouri to the north, the Kansas–Missouri state line to the west, 31st Street to the south and Woodland Avenue to the east. However, the definition used by the Downtown Council is the most commonly accepted.

In March 2012, downtown Kansas City was selected as one of America's Best downtowns by Forbes magazine for its rich culture in arts, numerous fountains, upscale shopping, and local cuisine such as barbecue.

== Demographics ==
In 2021, the Downtown Council reported a population of 31,229 residents and a median household income of $70,254.

In 2000, the population may have been as low as 10,000 people with 7,330 units. In 2005, the population density was approximately 5,617 inhabitants per square mile (2,169/km^{2}) in its 3.0-square-mile (7.8 km^{2}) area. According to Local Market reports, Downtown houses approximately 20,000,000 square feet (1,900,000 m^{2}) of office space. However, the vacancy of this space was at about 15%. Downtown has about 12,800,000 square feet (1,190,000 m^{2}) of Class A&B office space, with a vacancy rate of 15.9%, and over 100,000 employees. Downtown has a total of 5,606 hotel rooms, accounting for 22.5% of the total amount of hotel rooms in the metropolitan area. The average occupancy of these rooms is about 56.5%. As of 2007, about 2,800,000 square feet (260,000 m^{2}) of office space are under construction in downtown Kansas City. Current investments into downtown redevelopment have exceeded $6 billion.

== Architecture ==
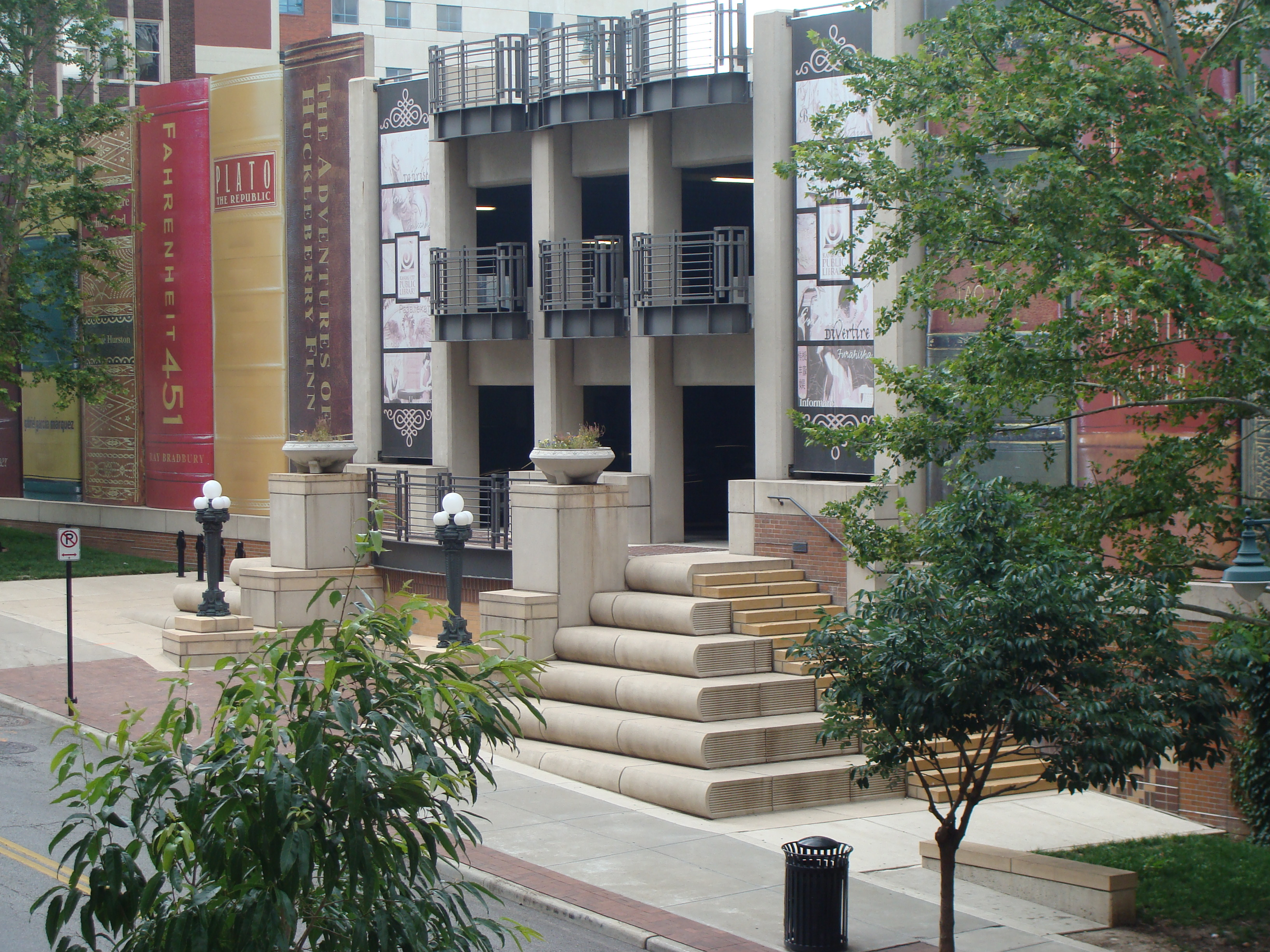
The central branch of the Kansas City Public Library has a parking garage themed as a bookshelf.

- Boley Building, one of the world's first glass-curtain buildings, listed on the National Register in 1971
- Cathedral of the Immaculate Conception, serves as the seat of the Roman Catholic Diocese of Kansas City-St. Joseph along with the Cathedral of St. Joseph
- Central Library, main branch of the Kansas City Public Library system
- Commerce Tower, headquarters of Commerce Bank
- City Hall, 29-story skyscraper
- Hotel President, historic hotel whose famous Drum Room lounge has attracted entertainers from across the country, including Frank Sinatra, Benny Goodman, and Marilyn Maye, hosted the 1928 Republican National Convention, listed on the National Register in 1983
- Kansas City Athletic Club, athletic club and gentlemen's club, notable members have included President Harry S. Truman
- Kansas City Convention Center, major convention center, largest column-free convention environment in the world
- Kansas City Club, was the oldest gentlemen's club in Missouri, notable members included Presidents Harry Truman and Dwight D. Eisenhower, General Omar Bradley, and political boss Tom Pendergast
- Kansas City Power and Light Building, was the tallest building west of the Mississippi River upon its completion after succeeding the Smith Tower until the completion of the Space Needle in 1962, listed on the National Register in 2002
- Louis Curtiss Studio Building, designed by architect Louis Curtiss and served as his studio, listed on the National Register in 1972
- Mainstreet Theater, historic theater, listed on the National Register in 2007
- Midland Theatre, historic theater, listed on the National Register in 1977
- Municipal Auditorium, multi-purpose facility that features Streamline Moderne and Art Deco architecture, hosted 9 Final Fours
- New York Life Building, regarded as Kansas City's first skyscraper and was the first building in the city equipped with elevators, listed on the National Register in 1970
- One Kansas City Place, tallest building in the state of Missouri
- Oppenstein Brothers Memorial Park, urban park located in the financial district
- Power and Light District, dining, shopping, office and entertainment district
- T-Mobile Center, large multi-use indoor arena, connected to the College Basketball Experience

== Redevelopment projects ==
Downtown Kansas City has been undergoing a massive boom in renovations and new construction. Since 2000, the estimated cost of these projects has totaled over $5.5 billion.

=== Power & Light District ===
The Power & Light District, also known as the Entertainment District, is a nine-block area to the immediate south of the Central Business District. Originally to be named Kansas City Live, Cordish, Inc. of Baltimore, Maryland – which developed the area – decided to name the district after the historic art deco Power & Light Building. The present headquarters of the Kansas City Power & Light Company, a subsidiary of Great Plains Energy, is also on the district's northern side. Instead, a one-block area near the new H&R Block headquarters tower – devoted to live music venues – was named Kansas City Live!.

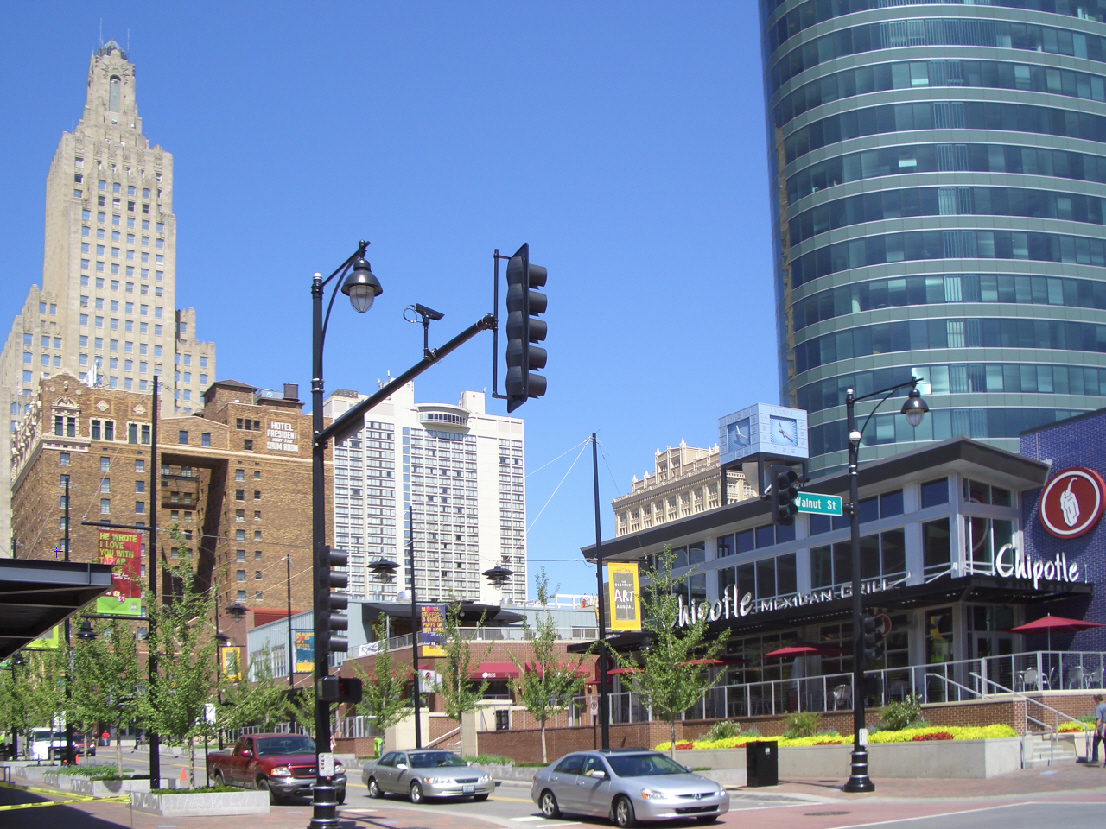
Kansas City Power and Light District

The H&R Block building, which opened in mid-2006, has a prominent oval shape, mixed with blue-green reflective glass. This is among newer, glass-walled buildings, also including the Sprint Center and the Kansas City Star printing press across I-670.

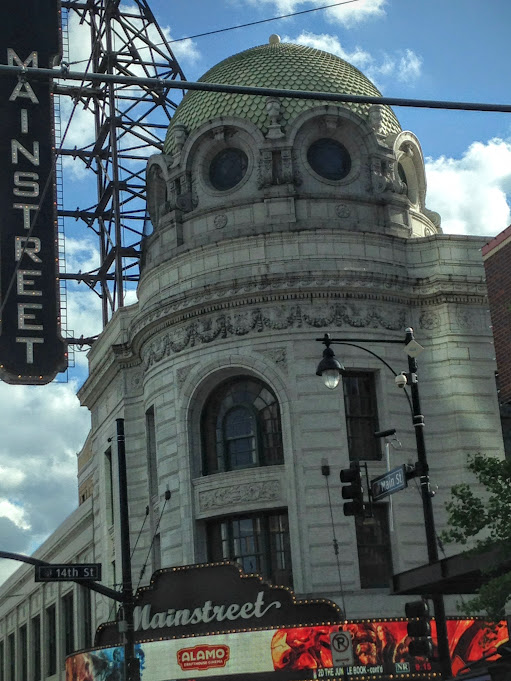
The redeveloped Mainstreet Theater is the Alamo Drafthouse.

Cordish planned four residential towers as part of the project, which include a 25-floor residential tower (One Light), to the immediate north of the H&R Block headquarters on a lot once occupied by the flagship store of the Jones Store Company. Groundbreaking on the complex began in March 2006. As of 2023, One and Two Lights are complete, and Three Light is under construction. The Entertainment District practically shares a border with I-670. Enclosed between the residential towers and H&R Block's new building will be many shops and restaurants new to the Kansas City area. The new district has become a major attraction for residents and visitors, and has had a civic impact on downtown similar to that experienced by other municipalities, such as Baltimore and San Antonio.

=== T-Mobile Center ===
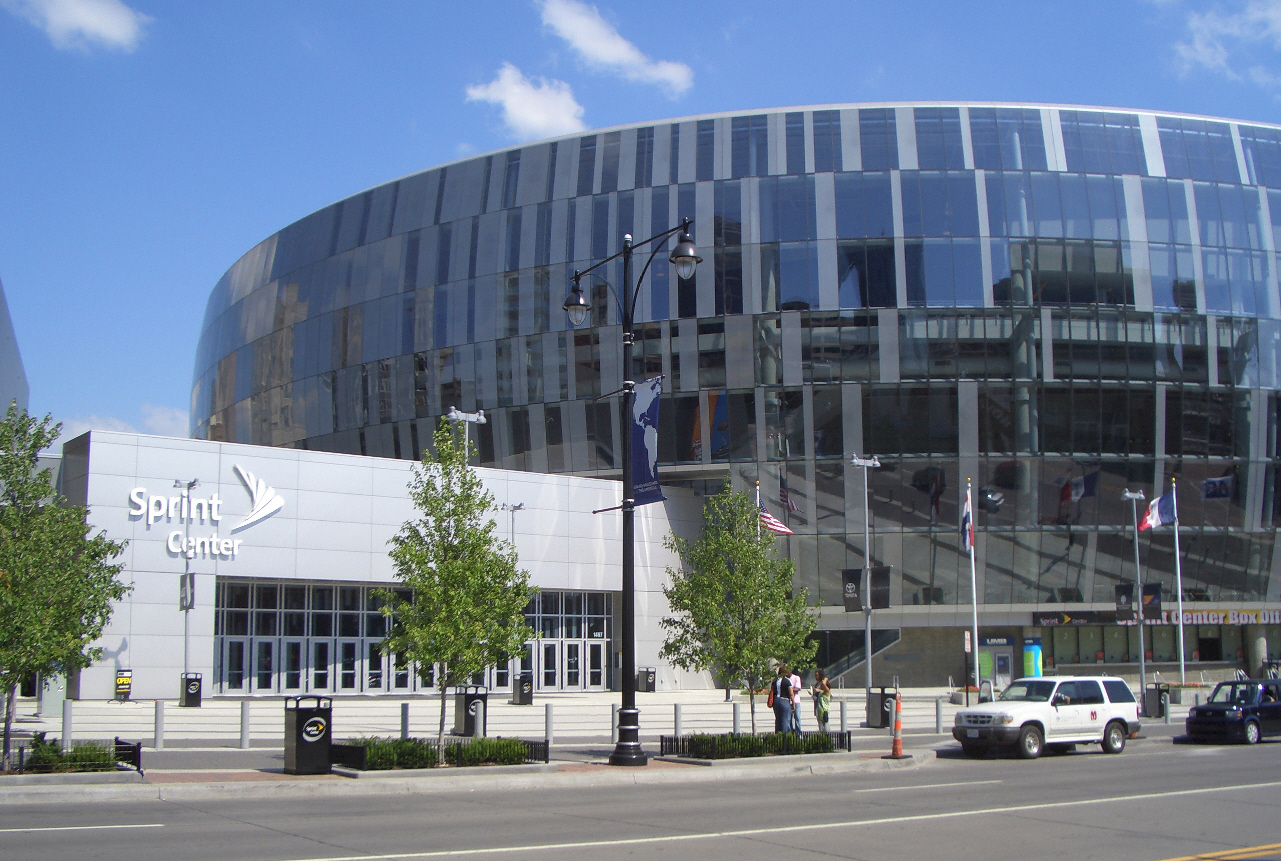
The T-Mobile Center lies within the Power and Light District.

The T-Mobile Center (formerly Sprint Center), an 18,500-seat arena, was announced shortly after the launch of the Power & Light District. In 2004, a ballot initiative to fund the proposed arena through a tax on car rentals and hotels was effectively passed by area voters. The project raised some controversy as Enterprise Rent-A-Car, whose owner is known for supporting a possible NBA franchise in the company's headquarters of St. Louis, lobbied against the tax and tried to sway public opinion against the arena. Some city officials, and citizens against the increased tax, also fought the project. One of the most prominent was Sandra McFadden-Weaver of the City Council. The arena vote passed decidedly.

Construction began on the T-Mobile Center in late 2004. Before this, however, and even before the vote, the city sent out requests to local and national architectural firms – including HOK Sports, Ellerbe Beckett, 360 Architecture, Rafael Architects Inc. and the world-renowned Frank Gehry – to bid on the project. The first four of the aforementioned firms, however, collaborated to form the "Downtown Arena Design Team," and won the contract over Gehry's bid, with the city citing the companies had completed a variety of sports-related projects and were based locally as the reason for their selection. Since construction began, many local minority leaders have protested the construction company and contractors for not putting enough minorities in the construction and contracting teams. The contractors, however, assert they have complied with state and federal requirements and continue to meet the requests of local citizens.

The T-Mobile Center opened in 2007; as of June 2011, the arena does not have an NBA or NHL tenant. However, the arena has served as the venue for events such as concerts and since March 2008, the Big 12 Basketball Tournament.

=== Kansas City Convention Center ===
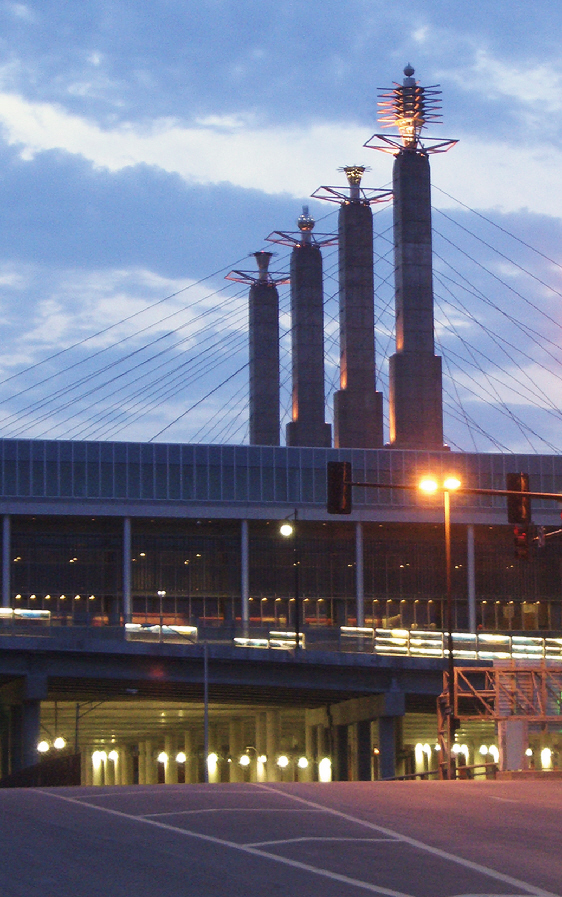
Kansas City Convention Center at dusk

The Kansas City Convention Center consists of several buildings, either connected to or adjacent to each other: Bartle Hall, the Grand Ballroom, the Conference Center, Meeting Rooms, and Barney Allis Plaza. This totals more than 800,000 square feet (74,000 m^{2}).

Bartle Hall was opened in 1976, in time for the Republican National Convention. As time passed, the need for more room grew. In 1994, Kansas City-based HNTB and BNIM designed an expansion that spanned over I-670 through downtown. After the project's completion, 388,800 square feet were available for the exhibition hall. The expansion also included a grand ballroom, conference center, and meeting rooms.

The facilities include Municipal Auditorium, an Art Deco venue built in 1934. It features an arena that seats 10,700; a music hall that seats 2,400; and a little theater suited for more private events. The auditorium connects via parking garage and skywalk to the rest of the convention center.

=== Kauffman Center for the Performing Arts ===
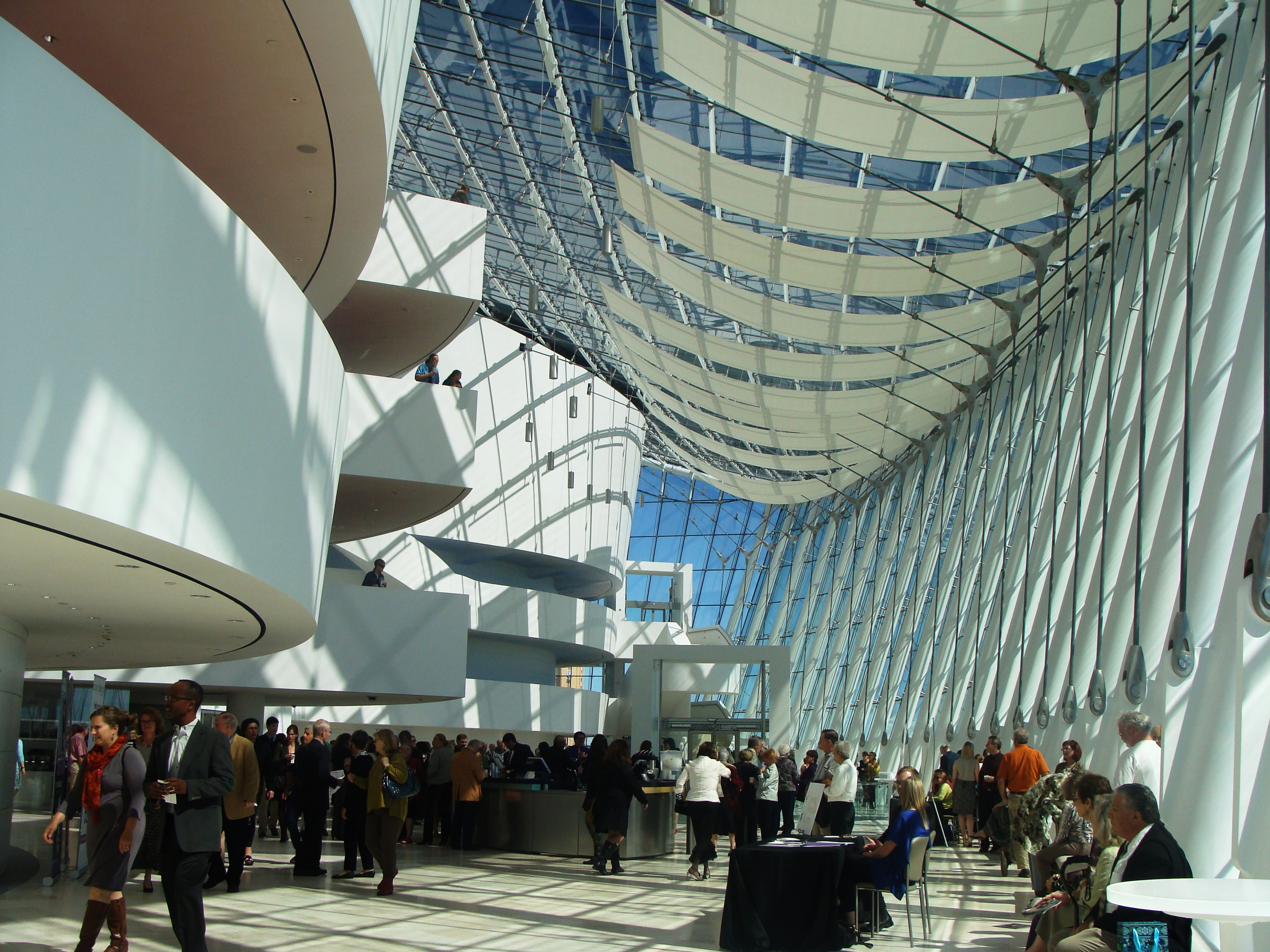
The Brandmeyer Great Hall is at the Kauffman Center for the Performing Arts.

The Kauffman Center for the Performing Arts is on the northern edge of the Crossroads Arts District, just south of the Bartle Hall ballroom. Construction began on October 6, 2006, and the facility opened to the public in September 2011. It was designed by architect Moshe Safdie.

The 316,000 square foot performing arts center consists of the Muriel McBrien Kauffman Theater, Helzberg Hall, and the Brandmeyer Great Hall. Its three resident companies are the Kansas City Symphony, Kansas City Ballet, and Kansas City Lyric Opera. By May 2015, more than 1.5 million people had attended the center.

=== Federal Reserve Bank of Kansas City ===
The Federal Reserve Bank of Kansas City is a 16-story office tower with a two-story operations center designed by Henry N. Cobb of Pei Cobb Freed & Partners. It is at Penn Valley Park on the southern edge of downtown, to the immediate west of Crown Center on a site formerly occupied by Trinity Lutheran and St. Mary's Hospitals. The bank was based out of a 21-story tower in the Downtown Loop until the Penn Valley Park facility opened in 2008.

=== IRS offices ===
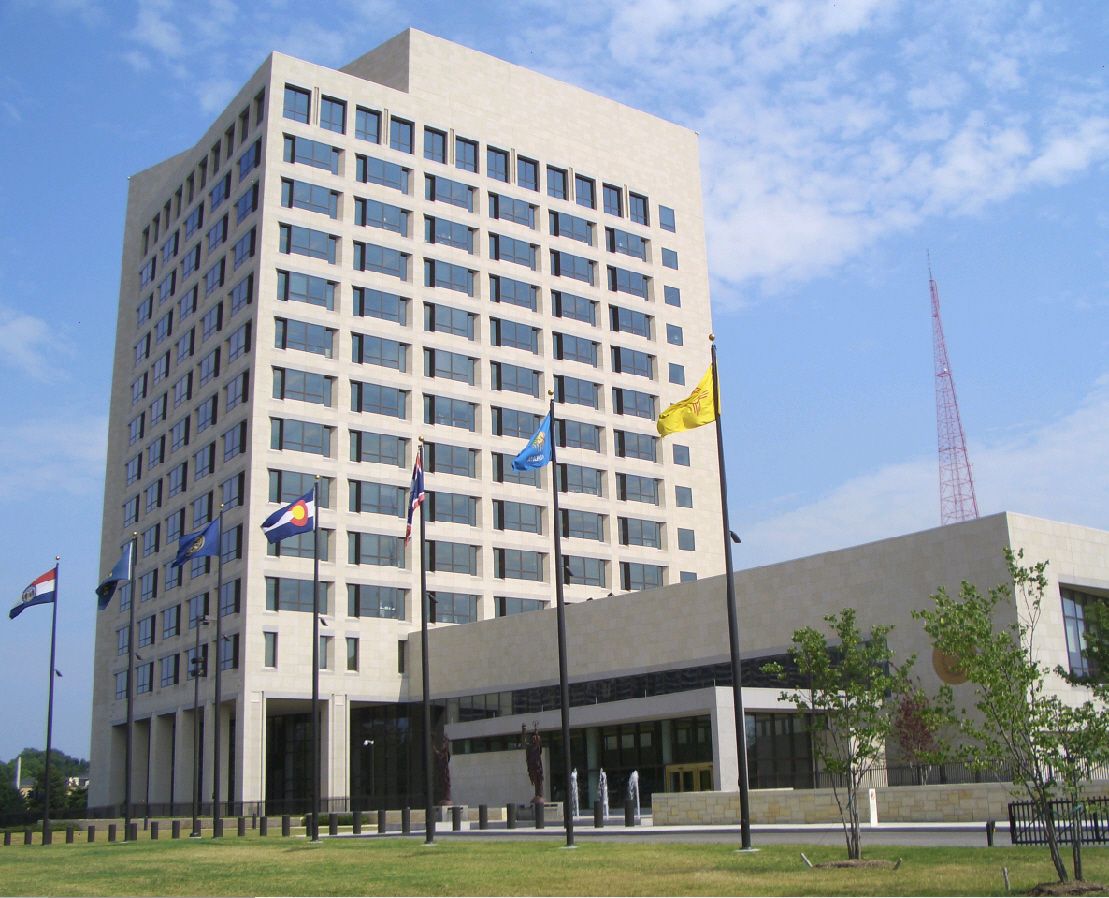
The Kansas City Federal Reserve building is along Main Street next to Liberty Memorial.

The Internal Revenue Service (IRS) has its Kansas City offices just west of Crown Center, which houses up to 6,000 employees. Construction began in 2004 and the building was completed in mid-2006. The IRS was also to occupy the nearby Kansas City Main Post Office building (the Post Office having moved across the street to a building next to Union Station).

=== Freight House ===
The historic Freight House building in the Crossroads Arts District was built in the 1880s; it was renovated in the late 1990s, and it is now home to Grunauer, Lidia's Kansas City, and Fiorella's Jack Stack Barbecue. The original plan for the redevelopment included a 21-story hotel and garage; however, the hotel portion of the plan did not materialize because of uncertainty about the future redevelopment of downtown.

In August 2007, developer Dan Clothier announced he wanted to complete his original plan by adding an 18-story hotel tower atop a three-level garage. The $38 million project calls for the structure to house 200 hotel rooms or a combination of 160 rooms along with some residential units.

=== Barkley, Inc. ===
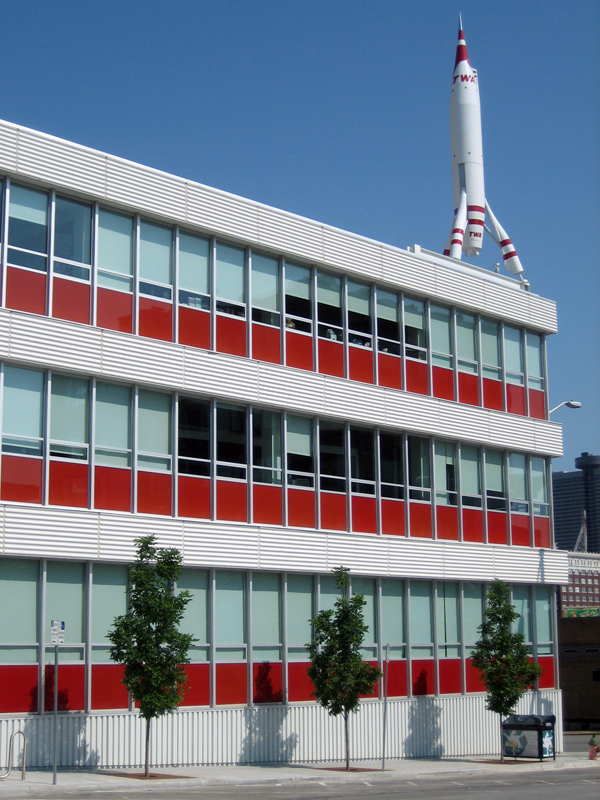
The TWA Moonliner atop the former TWA building is a landmark in the Crossroads Art District and the headquarters for Barkley.

In November 2006, Barkley Inc., an advertising and public relations firm formerly known as Barkley Evergreen & Partners, moved its 350+ employees to the former TWA world headquarters at the district's southern edge. The building had been empty for two decades and cost over $30 million to renovate. Barkley also reconstructed the famous Walt Disney-designed three-story rocket ship that stood atop the building during TWA's tenure. The Moonliner signified one-time TWA majority shareholder Howard Hughes' desire to guide the airline into space travel. Other renovations included a theater, grass-lined rooftop observation deck, open floor plan, and gallery space featuring art from local and national artists. Barkley adopted the rocket ship as its new logo shortly before moving into the renovated TWA space. BNIM Architects moved to the building's third floor in 2014.

== Economy ==
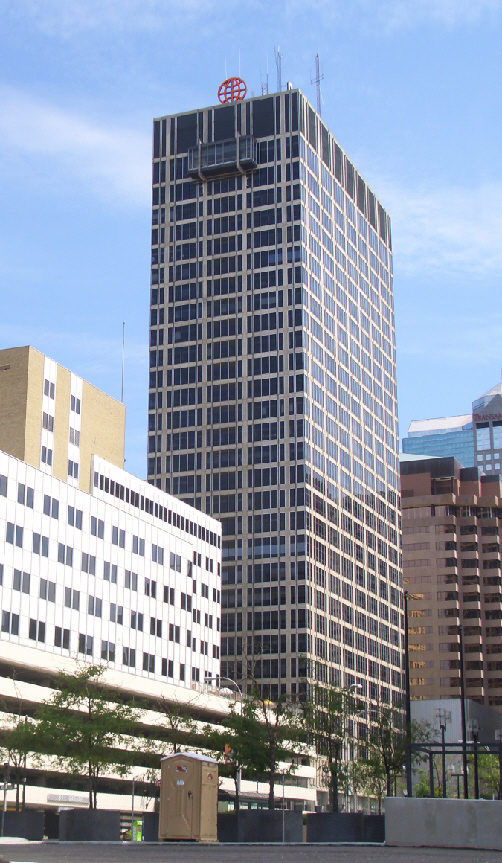
Commerce Bank Tower

The Commerce Bank Tower at 9th and Main Streets housed Kansas City's largest bank until it was renovated into a multi-use property of apartments, child care center, and Park University school. H&R Block, Commerce Bancshares, UMB Bank, Kansas City Southern, BNIM, Great Plains Energy, Aquila, DST Systems, J.E. Dunn Construction Group and HNTB are also among the companies headquartered in downtown Kansas City.

== Points of interest ==
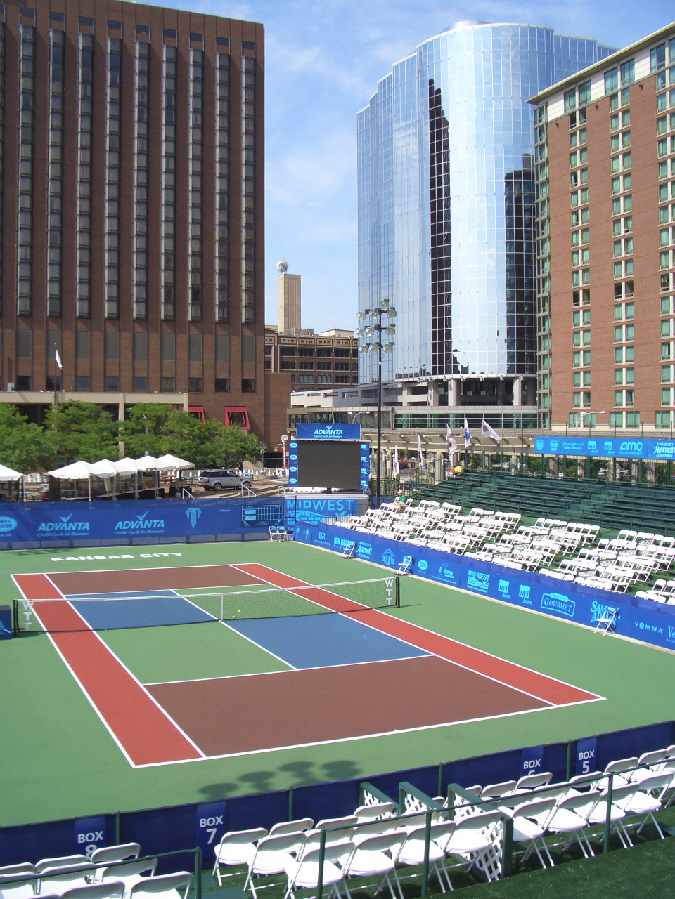
The Kansas City Explorers has a Tennis Court in Barney Allis Plaza.

- T-Mobile Center
- The Midland Theatre
- Power & Light District
- Kauffman Center for the Performing Arts
- The Crossroads Arts District
- Folly Theater
- The River Market
- Municipal Auditorium
- Crown Center
- Union Station
- Liberty Memorial

The Barney Allis Plaza is a park at the intersection of 12th Street and Wyandotte. It is named after the prominent Kansas City hotelier, and owner of the Standard Theater, Barney Allis. From April 11, 2006, until 2011, it hosted the Kansas City Explorers, the World TeamTennis team. The Kansas City Sports Walk of Stars was constructed at the edge of this park in 1991, and the first three polished granite slabs bore the names of inductees George Brett, Len Dawson, and Tom Watson. The Walk is officially recognized by the city, and has used its common-law trademark since 1993.

== Neighborhoods ==
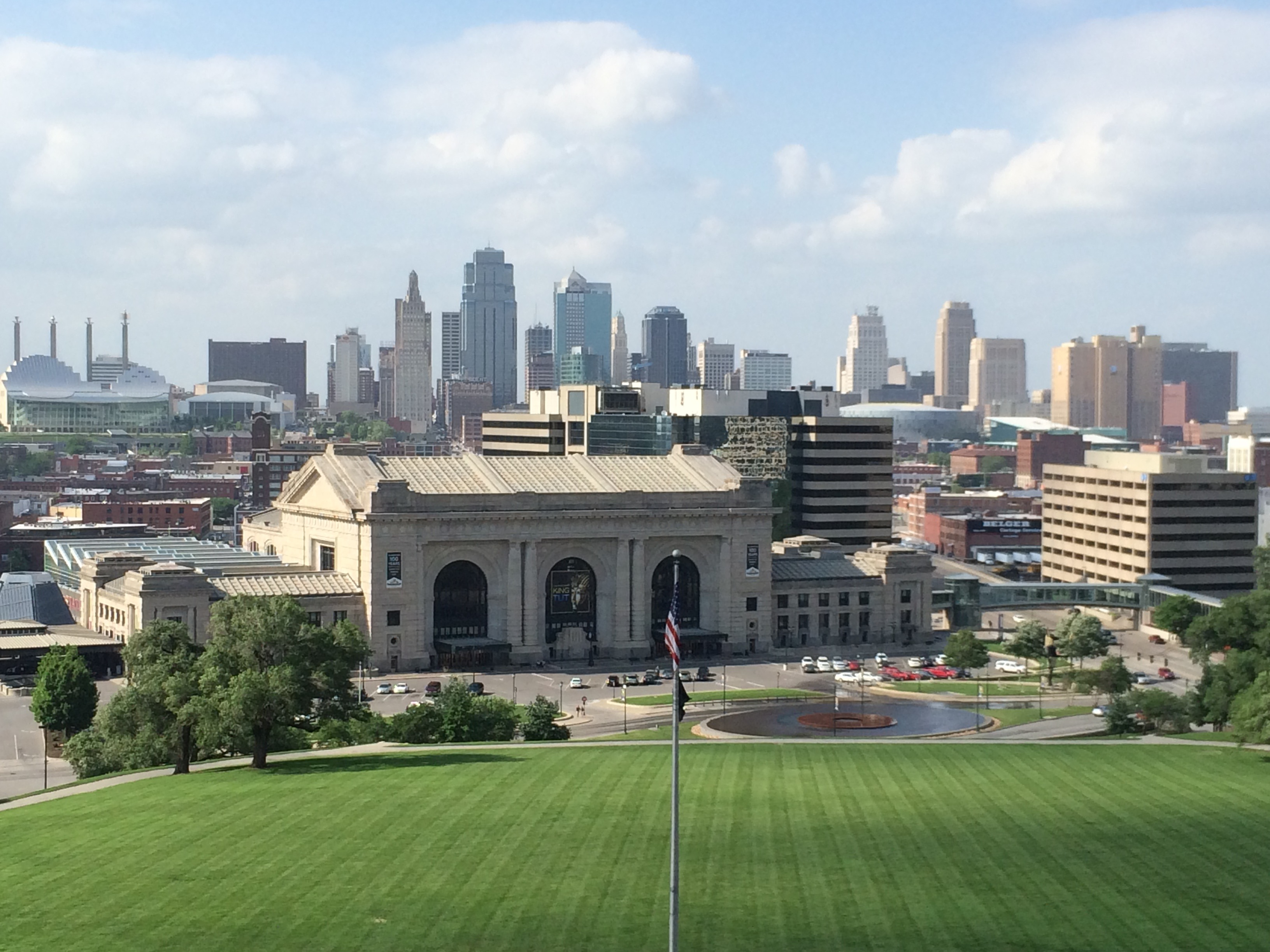
The downtown loop from the Liberty Memorial

=== The Loop ===
The Loop is the north central section of downtown Kansas City; it is the most dense section of the city, and is surrounded on all four sides by the downtown freeway loop. Altogether, the Loop has an area of nearly one square mile. In 2006, the Downtown Loop had nearly 8,000 residents. The Downtown Loop encompasses Quality Hill, the Central Business District, the Entertainment District, and the Government District.

Districts in The Loop are:

- The Library District is an officially designated area roughly bounded by 9th and 11th Streets on the north and south, and Main Street and Broadway on the east and west in downtown Kansas City. The Library District name was adopted in 2003 in connection with the move of the Kansas City Public Library's Central Branch to a building formerly the headquarters of the First National Bank of Kansas City. This area includes the Kansas City Club, the Community Bookshelf (which is the exterior of the library's parking garage), and the 10th and Main Transit Plaza, one of the regional bus terminals. This area was developed as a commercial and entertainment area in the 1880s, but it now has many loft buildings. Several surface parking lots that remain may be redeveloped into more intensive developments.
- The Garment District is to the east of Quality Hill, across Broadway Boulevard. In the 1930s, several large clothing manufacturers clustered here, making Kansas City's garment district second only to New York City's in size. This heritage is commemorated by an oversized needle and thread monument. Its old industrial buildings have been redeveloped into loft apartments, office space and restaurants. Henry Perry, originator of Kansas City-style barbecue, started in 1908 at an alley stand in the neighborhood.
- The Government District – on the east side of the downtown loop – consists of Kansas City's City Hall (the tallest city hall in the United States at 30 stories), the Jackson County Courthouse, Police Headquarters, the Bolling Federal Building, the Charles Evans Whittaker U.S. Courthouse, which serves as the seat of the United States District Court for the Western District of Missouri. The government buildings are in walking distance of each other and are centered around Ilus Davis Park.
- The Financial District, includes Kansas City's main skyscrapers, such as One Kansas City Place (the tallest habitable structure in Missouri), the Town Pavilion, and City Center Square. The district also includes the headquarters of the Kansas City, Missouri School District and, until the spring of 2008, the Federal Reserve Bank of Kansas City. The financial buildings are in walking distance of each other.
- The Power & Light District is a nine-block entertainment district developed by the Cordish Company of Baltimore, Maryland, which has been under construction since 2004 and is nearing completion. It is situated along the southern edge of the downtown loop, bordered by Truman Road and Interstate 670 to the south and Bartle Hall Convention Center to the west. It includes the Municipal Auditorium, H&R Block's new corporate headquarters and the 18,000-seat Sprint Center, which opened on October 10, 2007.
- The Convention District consists of the Kansas City Convention Center, Municipal Auditorium, the Power & Light District, and the T-Mobile Center, each in walking distance.

=== Crossroads Arts District ===
The Crossroads District, formerly a warehouse district from I-670 in the north up to Union Station in the south, is going through a period of revitalization, like much of the city. Buildings are being redeveloped for office and residential uses. Several restaurants and art galleries are now within the district, and the area has a monthly event known as First Fridays. They feature pop-up art galleries, food trucks, live music, and shopping deals.

=== Crown Center ===
Crown Center is a district developed by Hallmark. Within Crown Center, families can enjoy an aquarium, Legoland, and Kaleidoscope. There are several mid to upscale stores, and hotels include the Sheraton and the Westin. The district is a short walk from the National World War I Museum and Memorial. Union Station and the rest of Crown Center connect via a skywalk called the Link.

=== The River Market ===
The River Market is Kansas City's original neighborhood on the Missouri River. The district contains one of the country's largest and longest lasting public farmers' markets, and several unique shops and restaurants. The Arabia Steamboat Museum is next to the City Market. The Town of Kansas Bridge reaches the Riverfront Heritage Trail which leads to Berkley Riverfront Park, which is operated by Port KC.

== Transportation ==
=== KCATA- RideKC ===
==== RideKC Bus & MAX ====
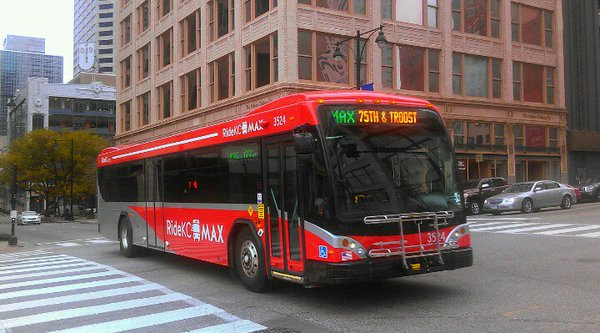
Newly branded RideKC MAX

Launched by the Kansas City Area Transportation Authority (KCATA) in July 2005, "MAX" (Metro Area Express) is a bus rapid transit line extending from downtown through the Country Club Plaza to Waldo. The MAX buses include GPS to transmit real-time data on the next pickup time to each station where the line stops; all buses have dedicated lanes during rush hour and stoplights can automatically change in their favor, if needed, if buses are behind schedule.

A second MAX route opened on January 1, 2011 (Troost Avenue MAX, or "Green Line"), which shares some downtown stops with what is now called Main Street MAX (or "Orange Line"). Most other KCATA routes have stops throughout downtown, centered on the Transit Plaza at 10th & Main Streets and Grand Avenue between 11th and 12th Streets.

==== RideKC Streetcar ====
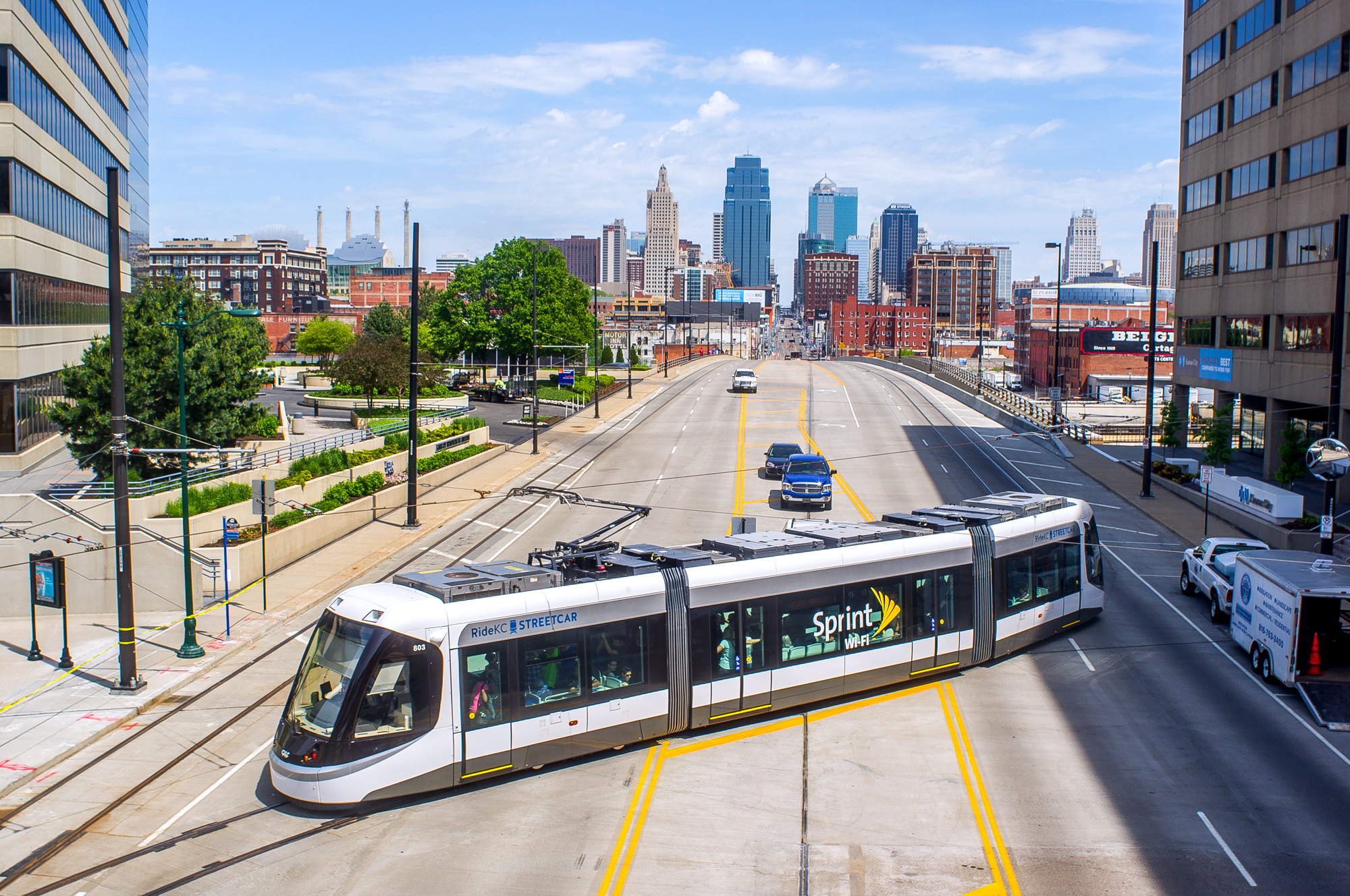
A RideKC Streetcar departing Union Station, heading north

On December 12, 2012, a ballot initiative to construct a $102 million, two-mile streetcar, to stretch from River Market to Crown Center, was approved by local voters. Construction on the line began in 2013, and the line became operational in May 2016. A new non-profit corporation made up of private sector stakeholders and city appointees – the Kansas City Streetcar Authority – operates and maintains the system. Unlike many similar systems around the U.S., there will be no fare charged. The city is planning to add multiple extensions to the starter line.

==== RideKC Bridj ====
In 2015, the KCATA, Unified Government Transit, Johnson County Transit, and IndeBus (all separate metro services) began merging into one coordinated transit service for the Kansas City region, called RideKC. The buses and other transit options will be branded as: RideKC Bus, RideKC MAX, RideKC Streetcar, and RideKC Bridj. RideKC Bridj is a micro transit service partnership between Ford Bridj and KCATA that began on March 7, 2016. Users download the Bridj app and use the service much like a taxi service. The merger and full coordination is expected to be complete by 2019.

=== Regional ===
- Amtrak
  - Union Station
- Bus Lines
  - Greyhound Lines
  - Jefferson Lines
  - El Conejo

== Education ==
=== Universities ===
- Park University (satellite location)
- Kansas City University of Medicine and Biosciences

=== Libraries ===
- Kansas City Public Library's Central Branch

== See also ==
- National Register of Historic Places listings in Jackson County, Missouri: Downtown Kansas City
- Architecture of Kansas City
- List of tallest buildings in Kansas City
- Central business district
