= City Center Square =

Skyscraper in Downtown Kansas City, Missouri

Lightwell Building (formerly City Center Square)
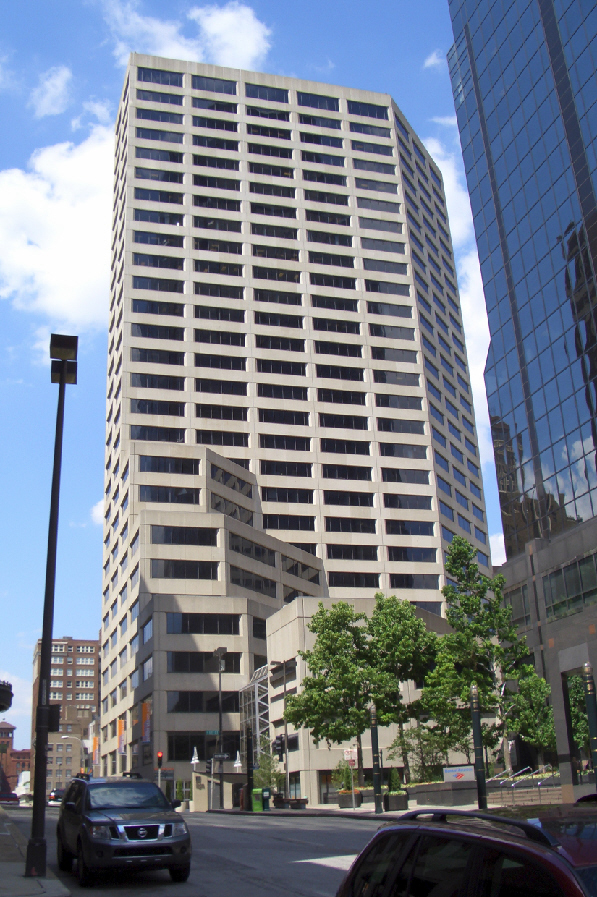
- Interactive map of the Lightwell Building (formerly City Center Square) area

General information
- Status: Completed
- Type: Office
- Location: 1100 Main Street, Kansas City, Missouri, U.S.
- Coordinates: 39°06′02″N 94°35′01″W
- Completed: 1978

Height
- Roof: 123 m (404 ft)

Technical details
- Floor count: 30
- Floor area: 60,322 m^{2} (649,300 sq ft)

Design and construction
- Architect: Skidmore, Owings & Merrill

Website
- lightwellkc.com

Lightwell Building (formerly City Center Square) is a skyscraper in Downtown Kansas City, Missouri, built by Skidmore, Owings & Merrill, in the Spring of 1977. It occupies the entire block of 11th Street to 12th Street, and from Main Street to Baltimore Street. Its tower is 30 stories tall, constructed with a reinforced concrete structure evident by the look of the exterior. It is the tenth-tallest habitable structure in the Kansas City Metropolitan Area, and the fifteenth-tallest habitable structure in Missouri at 404 feet (123 m).

In 2003, the property was appraised at $38 million when Citigroup underwrote a $29 million loan. Net operating income was $3.1 million. As the real estate market rose, the property was re-appraised in February 2005 for $60 million and Ally Financial (formerly GMAC) underwrote a $44 million 10-year loan. This loan went delinquent in April 2010. An August 2010 appraisal estimated property value at $38 million, below the $41 million remaining principal.

City Center Square was renamed to the Lightwell Building in 2019.

== Features ==
Lightwell is not only a business office but also a hotspot for food and retail in the Downtown area. The building is tall and stands out; the bottom floors "layer" from small to large , adding to the uniqueness of the building. Food services includes Jason's Deli. The food court is being remodeled into a food hall . Also included for convenience is a fitness center and a conference room. The building is in the lease up mode with having over 99,000 sq ft (9,200 m^{2}) in new, renewed or expanded leases in 2008.
