= Kansas City City Hall =

Office skyscraper in Kansas City, Missouri

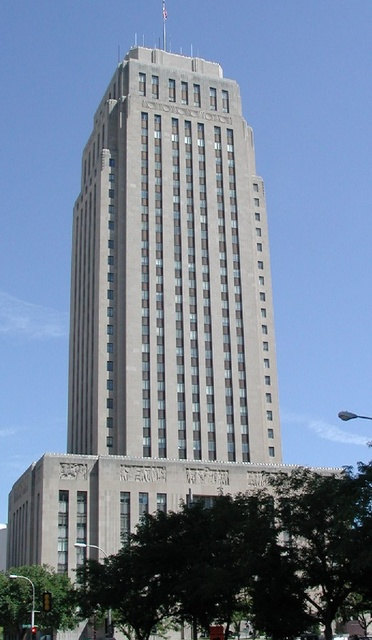
- Kansas City Hall in March 2007
- Interactive map of the Kansas City City Hall area

General information
- Status: Completed
- Type: City hall
- Architectural style: Art Deco; Beaux-Arts
- Location: 414 East 12th Street, Kansas City, Missouri, U.S., United States
- Coordinates: 39.100569°N 94.577997°W
- Construction started: 1935; 91 years ago
- Completed: 1937; 89 years ago
- Owner: City of Kansas City

Height
- Antenna spire: 520 ft (160 m)
- Roof: 443 ft (135 m)

Technical details
- Floor count: 30

Design and construction
- Architect: Wight and Wight
- Main contractor: Swenson Construction Company

Kansas City City Hall is the official seat of government for the city of Kansas City, Missouri, United States. Located in downtown, it is a 29-story skyscraper with an observation deck. Completed in 1937, the building has a Beaux-Arts and Art-Deco style with numerous architectural features and ornamentation throughout. One Kansas City Place was modeled as a 1980s version of City Hall, and is the tallest building in Kansas City.

== History ==
Situated on a city block bounded by E. 11th Street, E. 12th Street, Oak Street, and Locust Street, this 29-story structure was designed by Wight and Wight in the Neo-Classic and Beaux-Arts architectural style and built to replace and expand an earlier city hall. It is the third city hall since the incorporation of the City of Kansas in 1853. Construction of the building lasted for 22 months and the concrete was supplied by then-political boss Tom Pendergast. Its location has served as the center of city government since 1937.

When it was completed, it was the tallest building in the city. It is currently the third-tallest building in the city and one of the tallest city halls in the United States. The exterior features Indiana limestone. An underground parking garage extends under the south lawn. Several types of marble enhance the building’s interior design, including Pyrenees marble from southwestern France, travertine marble from Tivoli, Italy, and Verde antique marble from Vermont. Some of the woods are oak and walnut. The total cost of construction was approximately $6 million, which far exceeds the $4 million bond monies allotted for the project.

== Features ==
=== Interior ===
The building has Art-Deco details and ornamentation. This is particularly evident within the building. The entrance interior has elaborate marble stairways and bronze architectural features honoring the history of Kansas City. Myriad interior details include sculpted brass elevator doors depicting the four major modes of transportation that serve Kansas City, elaborate light fixtures in the lobby and elsewhere, and custom brass doorknob plates.

=== Exterior ===
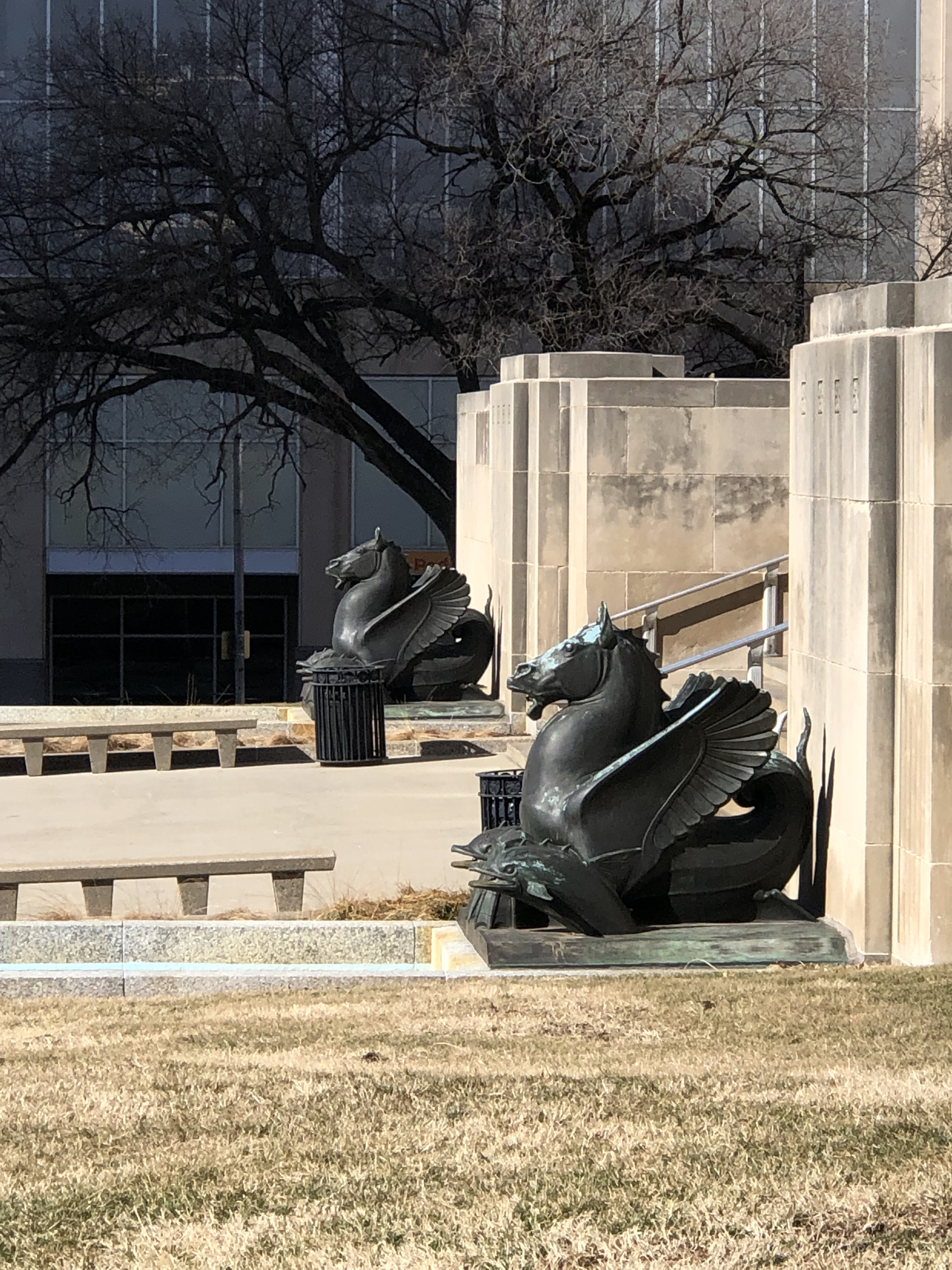
The seahorse fountains on the south side of City Hall.

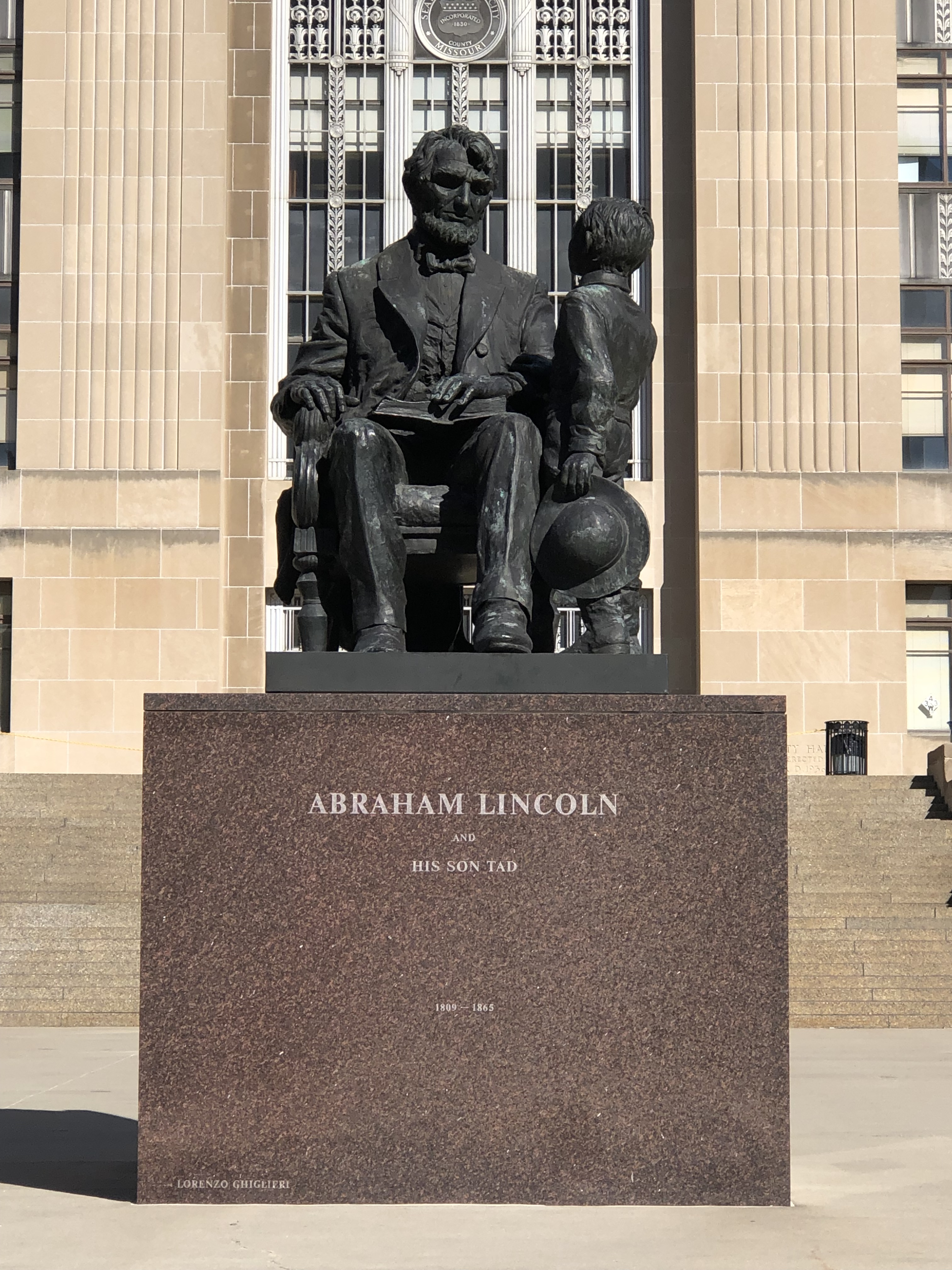
A statue of Abraham Lincoln and his son Tad is on the south side of City Hall.

At the top of the six story base on the exterior of the building, windows are replaced with a frieze of relief sculptures depicting the early settlement and growth of the Kansas City area. Sculptures on the exterior of the building include those by C. Paul Jennewein, Ulric Ellerhusen, and Walker Hancock. Images in the panels of the building include Senator Thomas Hart Benton, Benoist Troost, Lewis and Clark, the Chouteau trading post, the Santa Fe Trail, and others

To the south of the building are fountains with two ornamental sea horses, dolphins, and seashells. City employees named the sea horses on the west side "Lug" and those on the east side "Cut" after the fountain's dedication. They were named for lugs of the political machine and cuts in pay for city workers in the 1930s. A statue of Abraham Lincoln and his son Tad was sculpted by Lorenzo Ghiglieri.

The top floor features an observation deck.

== See also ==
- List of tallest buildings in Kansas City, Missouri
