= One Kansas City Place =

Tallest building in the U.S. state of Missouri

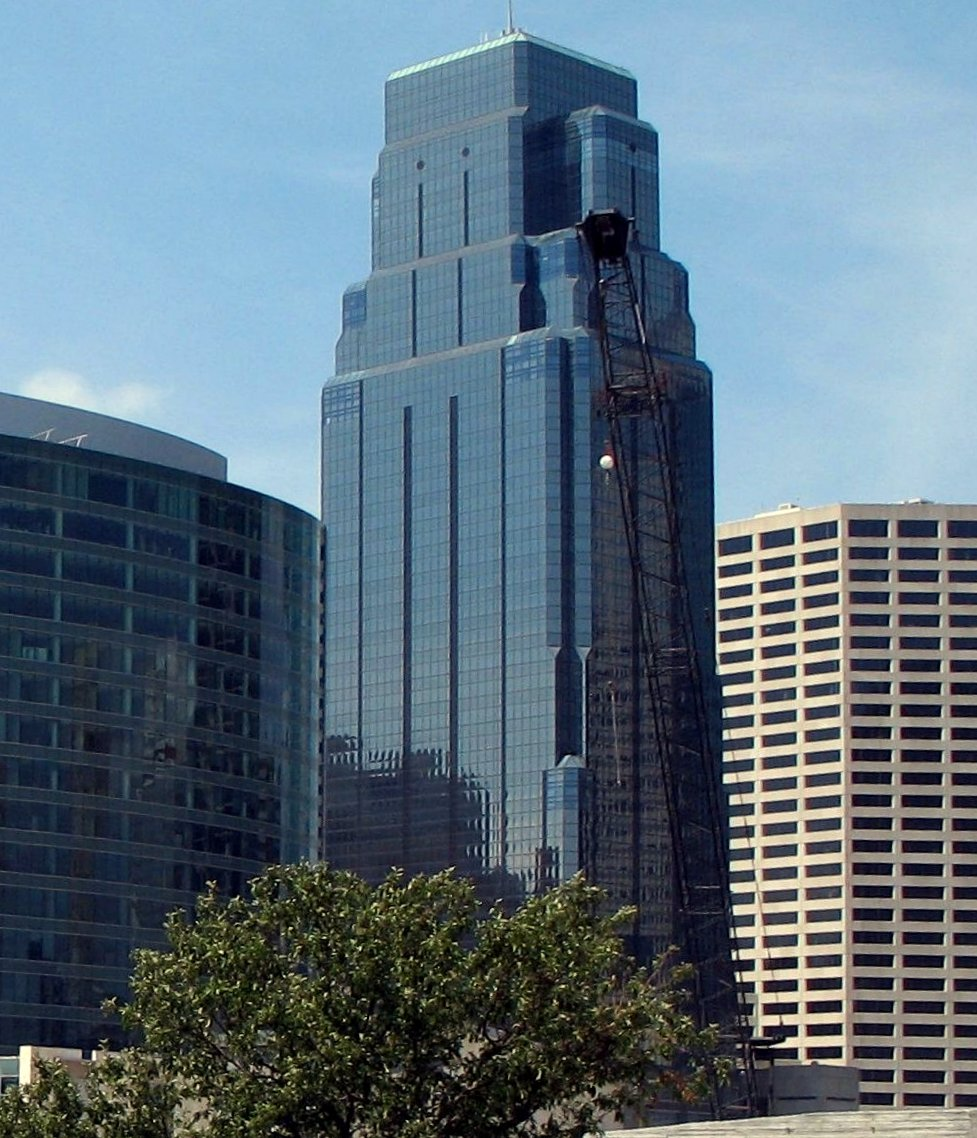
- One Kansas City Place in 2006

General information
- Status: Completed
- Type: Commercial offices
- Location: 1200 Main St; Kansas City, Missouri
- Coordinates: 39.099714°N 94.583729°W
- Construction started: 1985; 41 years ago
- Completed: 1988; 38 years ago
- Cost: US$140 million
- Owner: Executive Hills Management Inc.

Height
- Antenna spire: 654 ft (199.3 m)
- Roof: 623 ft (189.9 m)

Technical details
- Floor count: 42 below ground 5
- Floor area: 80,515 m^{2} (866,660 sq ft)
- Lifts/elevators: 22

Design and construction
- Architect: Patty Berkebile Nelson & Immenschuh
- Structural engineer: Seiden & Page/Page McNaghten Associates
- Main contractor: Tom Martin Construction

Other information
- Public transit: RideKC; KC Streetcar

One Kansas City Place is the tallest building in the U.S. state of Missouri. It is located in Downtown Kansas City, Missouri, bounded by 12th Street to the north, Baltimore Avenue to the west, and Main Street to the east. Built in 1988, the 623-foot (189.9 m) skyscraper was designed by Patty Berkebile Nelson & Immenschuh. It succeeded the Town Pavilion as the city's tallest building.

One Kansas City Place was designed to be a modern version of Kansas City's famed 30-story Art Deco building Kansas City City Hall, which is located five blocks east of Main on 12th Street.

== History ==
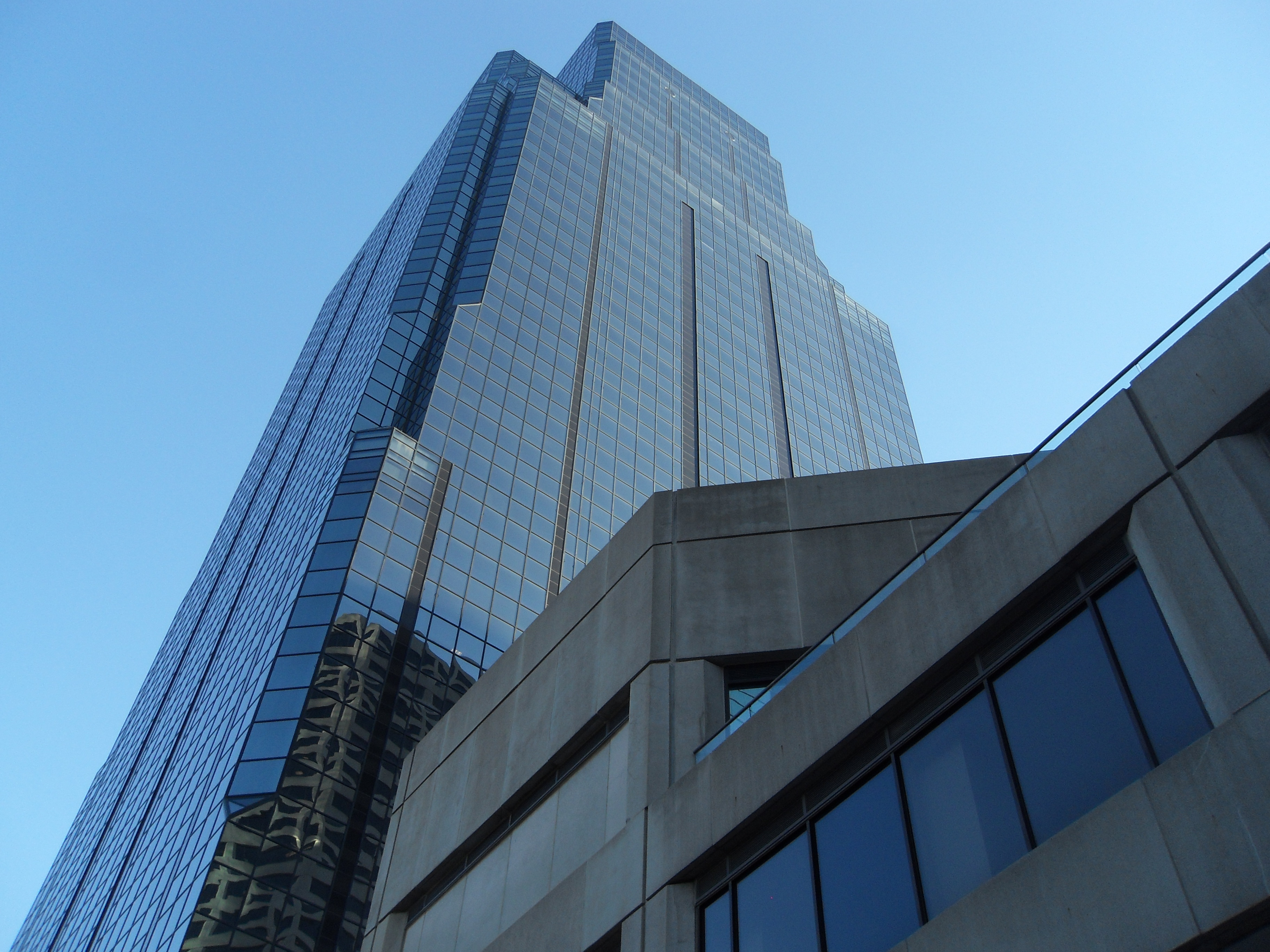
Looking up at One Kansas City Place from Main Street

One Kansas City Place was constructed as the first part of a much larger project named Kansas City Place, which never was completed. The project was to include townhomes, office towers, and residential/hotel towers. The Kansas City Place project was originally proposed during the real estate boom of the 1980s. The plan was developed by Frank Morgan and his uncle Sherman Dreiseszun who had earlier built Town Pavilion that was completed in 1986.

The tower was proposed for the South Loop (So-Lo) area south of downtown's central business district. The project included a plethora of skyscrapers with uses ranging from offices to hotels and residential buildings. Unsubstantiated claims hold that a major cause of the project's failure to come to its full stature was the complaints of residents, claiming it would ruin Kansas City's skyline, which had remained largely unchanged for 30 years.

One Kansas City Place was to be the third-tallest of several towers constructed, though it is the tallest that was actually constructed. Today, it is one of the most recognizable buildings in Kansas City's skyline.

Morgan and Dreiseszun (operating as MD Management) would see some of their banks fail in the wake of the project in the Savings and loan crisis. They would be indicted on federal charges of bid rigging to get government contracts. Morgan would die in 1993 and Dreiseszun would plead guilty to a misdemeanor charge and pay a fine of US$375,000.

== Lighting ==
At the four sides of its top, the building glows at night with red, white, and blue lights. Throughout the year, the colors change to red and yellow for important Kansas City Chiefs games, blue and white for important Kansas City Royals games, red for Valentine's Day, green for St. Patrick's Day, pink for Breast Cancer Awareness Month (October), and red and green for Christmas.

=== Project proposed building ===
Name	Floors	Status	Use
Two Kansas City Place	65	Cancelled	Office
Three Kansas City Place	55	Cancelled	Office
One Kansas City Place	43	Built	Office
Four Kansas City Place	24	Cancelled	Office
Kansas City Place Apartments	20	Cancelled	Residential
1200 Wyandotte	18	Built	Office
Kansas City Place Apartments	16	Cancelled	Residential
Kansas City Place Apartments	14	Cancelled	Residential

== Tenants ==
As of 2012, Bank of America maintains a large branch in the building's lower lobby. The building's largest tenant is Bryan Cave, a law firm based in St. Louis. Karbank Real Estate Company, an industrial development and brokerage company, occupies the 39th floor. Great Plains Energy and subsidiary Kansas City Power & Light Co. have taken space in the building in 2009. Tenants are provided security by EHI through Securitas AB.

== See also ==
- Architecture in Kansas City
- List of tallest buildings by U.S. state and territory
