= Rainey =

Rainey is a name of British-Irish origin.

== People with the surname ==
- Anson Rainey (1930–2011), Israeli professor of Ancient Near Eastern cultures
- Bobby Rainey (born 1987), American National Football League player
- Chuck Rainey (born 1940), American bassist
- David "Puck" Rainey (born 1968), American reality TV personality
- Darren Rainey (1962–2012), American prison inmate who died of burns from a scalding shower
- Edward Rainey (born 1961), Scottish painter
- Ford Rainey (1908–2005), American actor
- Grace Rainey Rogers (1867–1943), American art collector, philanthropist
- Henry Thomas Rainey (1860–1934), American politician
- Jocelynne Rainey (born ? ), American nonprofit leader
- John W. Rainey (1880–1923), U.S. Representative from Illinois
- John Rainey (baseball) (1864–1912), American Major League Baseball player
- John David Rainey (born 1945), U.S. federal judge
- Jon Douglas Rainey (born 1970), American professional thief on the reality TV show It Takes a Thief
- Joseph Rainey (1832–1887), American politician, first African-American United States Representative and second biracial Congressman
- Lawrence A. Rainey (1923–2002), American sheriff
- Ma Rainey (1882–1939), American blues singer
- Matt Rainey (born 1966), winner of the 2001 Pulitzer Prize for Feature Photography
- Paul J. Rainey (1877–1923), American businessman, philanthropist, hunter and photographer
- Philip Rainey (born 1959), Irish former rugby union player
- Robert E. L. Rainey (1914–2002), American artist
- Tanner Rainey (born 1992), American Major League Baseball pitcher
- Thomas Rainey (1824–1910), American entrepreneur
- Wayne Rainey (born 1960), American motorcycle racer
- William Rainey Harper (1856–1906), American academic administrator

== People with the given name ==
- Rainey Bennett (1907–1998), American artist and illustrator
- Rainey Bethea (c. 1909–1936), last person to be publicly executed in the United States
- Rainey R. Brandt (born 1966), American judge
- Rainey Cawthon (1907–1991), American football player and coach
- Rainey Haynes (born 1964), American singer-songwriter also known simply as "Rainey"
- Rainey Qualley (born 1989), American actress and singer

== See also ==
- Meredith Rainey-Valmon (born 1968), American runner
- East African cheetah, also known as Rainey's cheetah in honor of Paul J. Rainey
- Raney, a surname
- Ranney (disambiguation)
