= Robert James Raney =

American architect

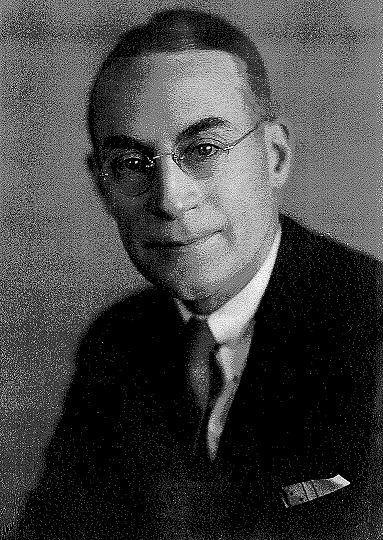
- Robert James Raney, circa 1925
- Born: November 2, 1883; Whistler, Alabama
- Died: April 10, 1963 (aged 79); Kansas City, Missouri
- Other name: RJ Raney
- Education: University of Alabama, Tuscaloosa
- Occupation: Architect
- Spouses: Corinne Hendrix (m. 1908; died 1930) Edna Adele Schmid (m. 1932)
- Children: Adele Ann Raney Harmeling; Roberta Ruth Raney O'Laughlin
- Parent(s): John Newton Raney; Annie Maher Johnson
- Practice: Raney & Dumas; Raney & Botkin; Fred Harvey Company
- Buildings: Auto Coach Building; Hesse Carriage Company Building; Guadalupe Center; Phantom Ranch Phase II; Auto Camp Lodge; La Posada Hotel; Desert View Watchtower; Bright Angel Lodge
- Projects: Westport Room, Kansas City Union Station; Fred Harvey facilities at Chicago Union Station; La Fonda Hotel with John Gaw Meem

Robert James Raney (November 2, 1883 – April 10, 1963) was an American architect who worked for 20 years as the chief architect of the Fred Harvey Company system. He is notable for the work he did for Fred Harvey during those years, as well as numerous other projects before and afterward.

== Family and education ==
Raney was born on November 2, 1883, into the working class, railroad community of Whistler, Alabama, son of John Newton Raney and Annie Maher Raney. His father was a blacksmith who worked for the Mobile, Jackson & Kansas City (M.J. & K.C.) and the Mobile & Ohio Railroads. He had three siblings, Edna Frances Raney Kohl (1885–1962), Annie Teresa Raney Gradel (1887–1969), and William Roy Raney (1891–1963).

After graduating from high school in the fall of 1899, Raney enrolled at the University of Alabama. Since the university required freshmen to be at least 16 years of age at the start of the fall term, October 4 that year, Raney used his mother's birthdate of September 19 so he would not have to wait another year. He used that as his birthdate for the rest of his life. Raney received his Bachelor of Science in engineering in 1903. He was also awarded a fellowship and received his master's degree in civil engineering the following year.

== Early career ==
Raney apprenticed for several years under Chattanooga architect David Vincent Stroop (1864–1943). Notable buildings by Stroop during Raney's apprenticeship include the still extant Christ Church Episcopal in Chattanooga (1908), a hotel on Lookout Mountain, and many residences for the affluent of Chattanooga. In 1908, Raney quietly married Miss Corinne Hendrix, who worked in Chattanooga as a bookkeeper to Ellsworth L. Mudge, a prominent photographer and client of Stroop. She was originally from Milledgeville, Georgia.

In 1910, the Raneys left Chattanooga for Kansas City, Missouri. Raney had accepted a draftsman position with the Missouri & Kansas Telephone Company. A little over a year later he left to work for eclectic architect Louis Curtiss. The chance to work for Curtiss, who has been called "the Frank Lloyd Wright of Kansas City," was an opportunity he was wise not to pass up. Buildings designed by Curtiss during the time Raney worked for him include six stone homes for William Rockhill Nelson in Kansas City, Missouri; the innovative Bernard Corrigan residence in Kansas City, Missouri; the Casa Ricardo Hotel for the St. Louis, Brownsville and Mexico Railway with Fred Harvey Company management in Kingsville, Texas; the St. Louis, Brownsville and Mexico Railway headquarters in Kingsville, Texas; the Santa Fe Depot in Snyder, Texas; and Union Station in Joplin, Missouri. In 1912, Curtiss also redesigned the home of J. Fred and Minnie Harvey Huckel in Kansas City. Minnie was the daughter of entrepreneur Fred Harvey and Huckel had been an executive with the Fred Harvey Company since the late 1890s and had founded and managed its Indian Department. This may have been Raney's first direct encounter with the Harvey family.

Raney left Curtiss in September 1913 to start his own architectural practice, perhaps precipitated by a decline in Curtiss' volume of work. Due to several factors, not the least of which was a nationwide recession and perhaps a shift in architectural preferences to more conservative styles, Curtiss trimmed down his local projects and concentrated more on his work for the railroad. Raney worked on his own for about a year, then went on to form a partnership with Pierre E. Dumas in October 1914.

Dumas' name on the business leaves the impression that he was also an architect, but his background indicates otherwise. In 1910, he was searching for a "situation" as a bookkeeper/timekeeper in Denver, Colorado. Again, in 1912, he was searching for a position as a Spanish or French correspondent. In 1913, he is listed as a clerk for Richardson & Boynton, a furnace company. Though in 1914, prior to his partnership with Raney, he was listed as an engineer with Lynn E. Bowman, a plumber, throughout the rest of his career, including his 1918 World War I draft registration which lists his occupation as "General Advertising Business" for the Clyde Glenn Company in Tampa, Florida, Dumas worked in advertising. An article about him in the Tampa Tribune indicates that his specialty was general advertising. During his time with Raney, he was likely responsible for marketing and acquiring new business.

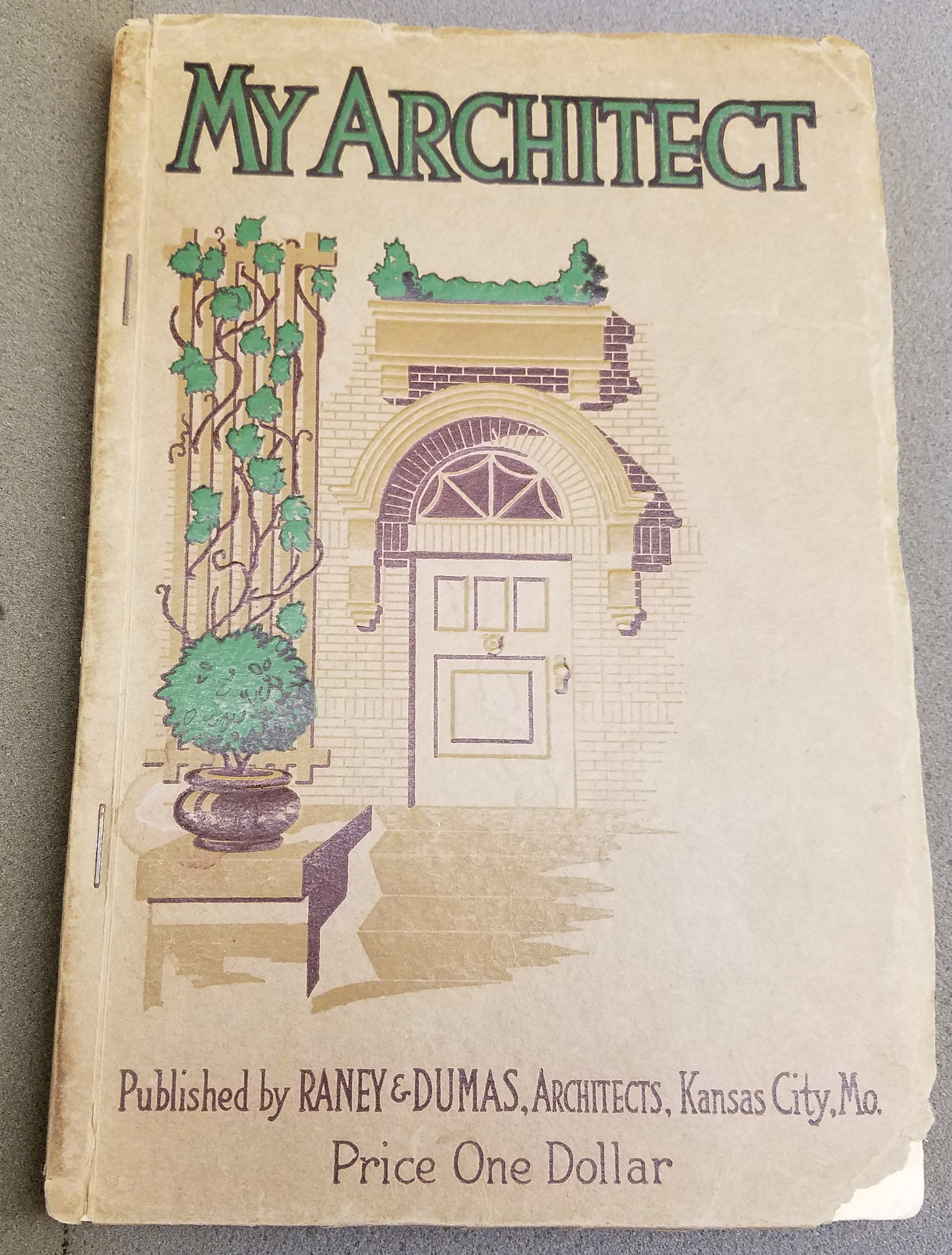
My Architect, A Compendium of Suggestions for the Prospective Builder, by Raney & Dumas

In 1915, Raney & Dumas published My Architect, A Compendium of Suggestions for the Prospective Builder. Well reviewed by the industry, the 128-page book contained illustrations, floor plans, and building advice for everything from small bungalows to larger "mansion types," apartments, garages, movie theaters, churches, banks, libraries, stores, landscape gardening, and farm buildings. While the plans for each building were available for purchase at a nominal charge as-is, the idea behind the book was to give the builder or property owner a starting point for their own architectural tastes.

Between 1913, when Raney was on his own, and the beginning of 1917, when his partnership with Dumas ended, Raney designed commercial buildings and residences in Kansas City and nearby towns. One of his first commissions was a new house for Fred Harvey executive Roland H. Ford in the Swope Park area of Kansas City. The home was based on Raney's Parkview design from My Architect. Several of the trade buildings are now part of the McGee Street Automotive Historic District in Kansas City, including 1701-1705, 1817, and 1827 McGee Street. The district itself was added to the National Register of Historic Places on May 20, 2018. Raney also designed the eastern addition of the Hesse Carriage Company Building at 1700 Oak Street, also on the National Register of Historic Places, which was commissioned in 1915 by Otto Hesse, son of William G. Hesse, the company's founder who had died in 1907. This second unit was to be a four-story building with its main facade facing Oak Street. Two stories were built in 1915, with the other two added in 1929. The Hesse Carriage Company, incorporated in 1903, specialized in carriages that were used as delivery vehicles for industries such as dairy, produce, bread, and ice. Otto Hesse and his partner Joseph Falk were able to segue their company into the automotive age by adapting their wagon bodies to fit automobile frames. The company became a leader in manufacturing custom bodies for automobiles and trucks.

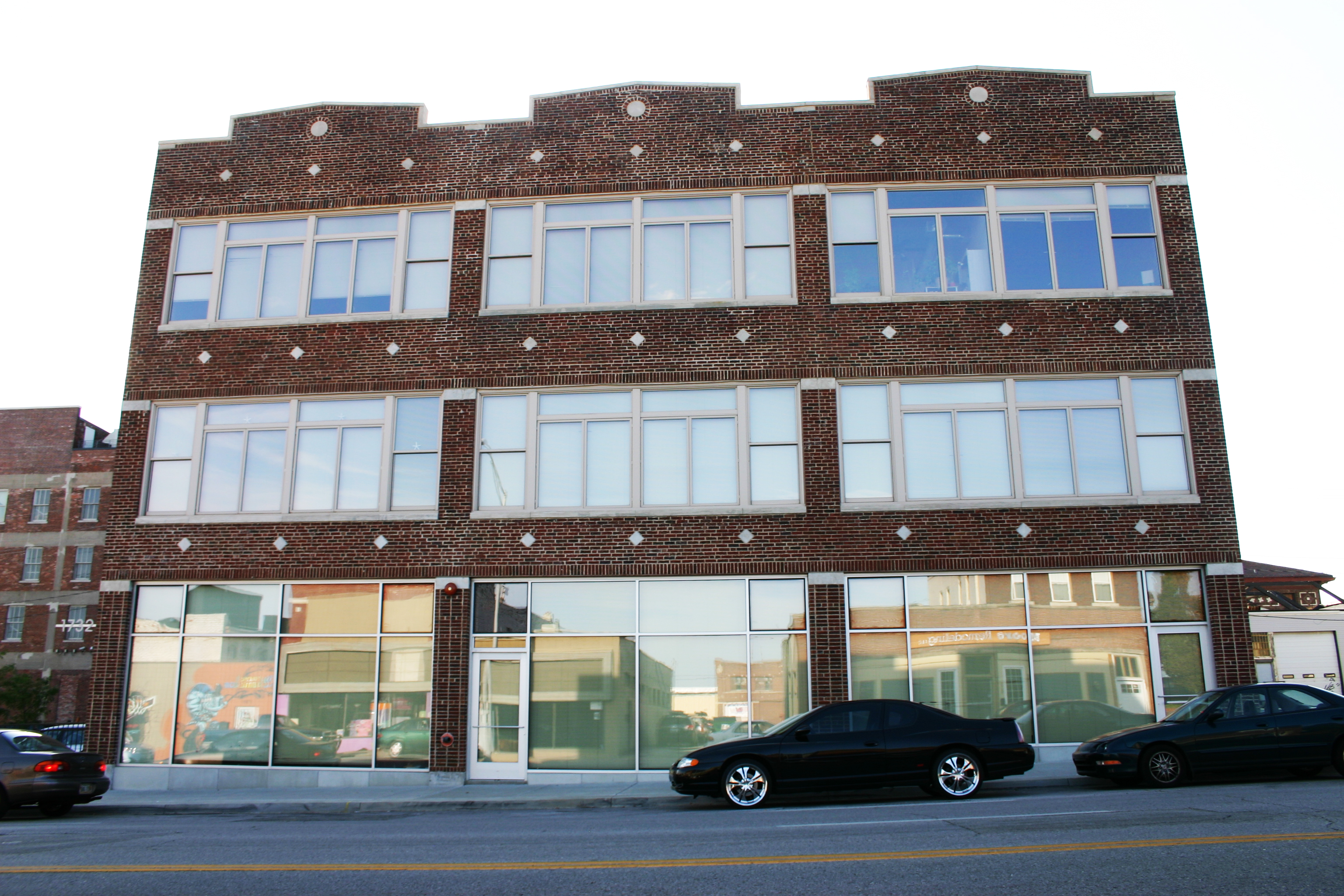
Auto Coach building

In February 1917, Raney's partnership with Dumas dissolved and he formed a new partnership with Millard Filmore Botkin. Like Dumas, Botkin was not an architect; he listed his role with Raney as "Service Director." The partnership was short-lived and ended mid-1917, possibly due to Botkin being drafted in the first wave of the Selective Service Act of 1917. During their association, Raney designed numerous residences and commercial buildings, including two more that have been included in the McGee Street Automotive Historic District (1725 and 1909 McGee Street) and the Auto Coach Building, also owned by Otto Hesse, at 1730-34 Oak Street.

== Fred Harvey years ==
Raney continued to work on his own through July 1918, designing at least four more commercial buildings in Kansas City, three on McGee Street and one on Oak Street. Only the building on Oak Street is extant. Raney's World War I draft registration reports him as architect for employer Fred Harvey, so sometime between July 1918, when he was designing 1601 Oak Street, and September 1918, Raney was hired by Fred Harvey as their first staff architect. Prior to this time, the Harvey system and Santa Fe Railway had exclusively used outside architects such as Charles Whittlesey and Louis Curtiss for their building projects. In addition to his talent and experience, his prior contacts with Curtiss, Minnie and J.F. Huckel, and Roland Ford likely helped him get his foot in the door.

Raney's Harvey career was temporarily interrupted, however, with the third round of registration for World War I on September 12, 1918, which required men ages 18 to 45 to register for the draft. Raney fell into this category and was selected to serve. In 1919, he was listed in Houston, Texas, as a draftsman for the U.S. Shipping Board Emergency Fleet Corporation.

In 1922, Raney was back with Fred Harvey, working with a young draftsman, William Raymond Ferris, who had been hired while Raney was in Texas. Ferris left the company in 1923 when he was invited to study at the Les Ecoles d'Art Américaines de Fontainebleau in Paris. In addition to Ferris, Raney was assisted over the course of his employment by a series of able, younger architects that included Charles O. Coverley, Emmett J. Corman, and Robert Lee Nusbaum.

Following Fred Harvey's death in early 1901, Fred Harvey (the company) had been run by Ford Harvey, Fred's eldest son, from the Kansas City office located at Union Station in Kansas City. Ford's younger brother Byron went to Chicago, and managed the Santa Fe dining car division. The Kansas City office handled the hotels, restaurants, railroad station concessions, and Park Service buildings. During his employment, which lasted until 1942, Raney designed the following:

1. 1925 Chicago Union Station Shops and Concession Stands
2. 1926 Auto Camp Lodge, Grand Canyon South Rim
3. 1927 - 1928 Phantom Ranch Phase 2, Grand Canyon
4. 1927 St. Elizabeth Parish School, Kansas City (side project) (St. Elizabeth School on Google Maps, "Streetview")
5. 1926 - 1929 La Fonda Addition, Santa Fe, New Mexico (assist to John Gaw Meem, Santa Fe)
6. 1930 La Posada Hotel, Winslow, Arizona
7. 1933 Desert View Watchtower, Grand Canyon South Rim
8. 1935 Bright Angel Lodge, Grand Canyon South Rim
9. 1935 Guadalupe Center (side project)
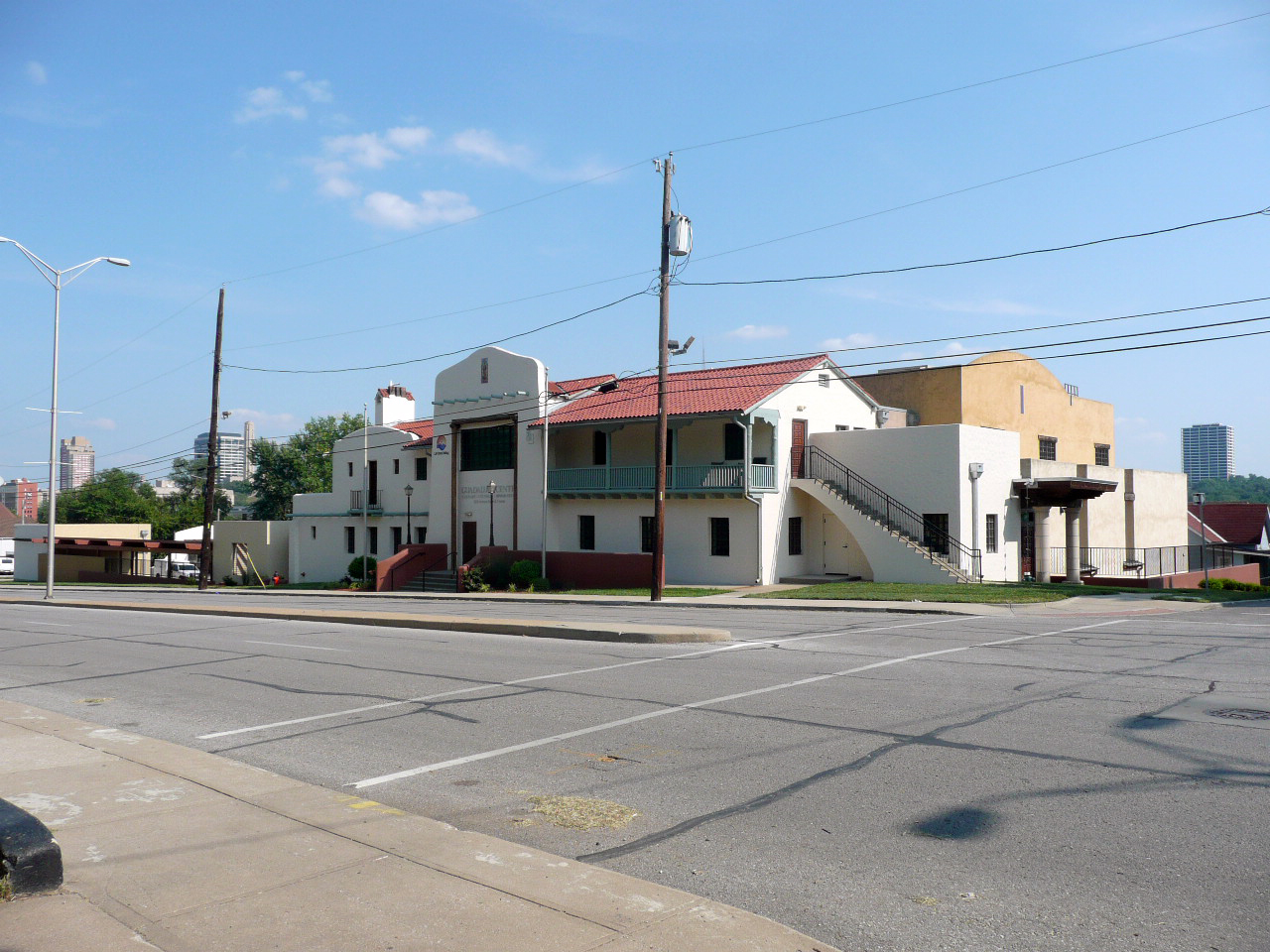
  Guadalupe Center
10. 1937 Westport Room, Kansas City Union Station (with Holabird & Root, Chicago)

== Closing of Fred Harvey Kansas City offices ==
Ford Harvey died in December 1928. Following his death, Byron was named president, but control of the company remained in Kansas City with Ford's son Freddy, and executives David Benjamin and J.F. Huckel. A chain of events over the next several years, however, changed things dramatically. David Benjamin died suddenly in 1933. Then in 1936, J.F. Huckel and Freddy Harvey died within weeks of each other, the latter in a horrible plane crash with his wife and dog on board. Katherine Harvey, who then had controlling shares of the company, was eventually forced to sell her shares to her uncle, Byron, who brought the main office to Chicago, something he had wanted to do for some time. Raney remained in Kansas City; his 1942 World War II draft registration, which lists his occupation as "Architect with Fred Harvey," with a work address of "293 Union Station" indicates that the architectural division had not yet been relocated. Projects had dwindled however; so in 1943, Raney accepted a position as architect for the Santa Fe Railway's Gulf Coast subsidiary (Gulf, Colorado & Santa Fe Railway) in Galveston, Texas, and moved his family there.

== Post Fred Harvey years ==
Raney remained in Galveston only a year or so. In 1944 he moved his family away from the coast to Temple, Texas, due in part to the weather (the 1943 "Surprise Hurricane" had hit the area on July 27, 1943) but also to the possibility of German U-boat activity in the Gulf Coast area. In 1946, following the war, Raney and his family moved back to Kansas City.

In early May 1948, Byron Harvey, Jr. phoned Raney with regard to returning to Fred Harvey. Harvey's follow-up letter on May 6, 1948, confirmed the company was "going back to our former method of handling our architectural and designing problems; in other words, we will probably employ an interior decorator and architect-draftsman." Byron wondered whether Raney would like to be considered for the position, which required a move to Chicago. Raney replied on May 10 that he was indeed interested, but hoped they would be able to come to an agreement that would allow him to stay in Kansas City. That agreement did not come to fruition; Raney remained in Kansas City, working alone through the 1950s, though he did partner with Donald F. Tuel briefly in the early part of the decade.

== Personal life ==
Raney's first wife, Corinne, died from stomach cancer in 1930. In 1932, he married Edna Adele Schmid, who also worked at Fred Harvey as an executive secretary. She had been hired in 1927 by Ford Harvey in response to a recommendation from Horace Albright, whom she had worked for in Yellowstone National Park for about 18 months. They had two daughters, Adele Ann (1933–2010) and Roberta Ruth (1936–1981).

Between December 1962 and January 1963, Robert Raney was diagnosed with cancer of the esophagus. He died April 10, 1963.

== Mary Colter's claims ==
Mary Colter claimed in her 1952 "Autobiographical Summary," submitted to Alice V. Donahue, Director of Public Relations at Fred Harvey in Chicago, that she was hired as architect and decorator in 1902, and that she was the architect of many of the same structures that are listed here as having been designed by Robert Raney. Her story became legend when subsequent biographers cited her summary as fact. In 2015, Fred L. Shaw began doing in-depth research into her life using independent, contemporaneous, primary sources, unlike prior biographers who had relied only upon her Autobiographical Summary, documents whose source could only be traced to Colter herself, and interviews with people who had been associated with her either later in life, or from outside her work environment. Shaw's research revealed that she falsely claimed the work of three architects, Robert James Raney, Louis Curtiss, and Charles Whittlesey.
