= Raney =

Raney is a surname, and may refer to:

- Albert Raney Sr. (fl. 1949–1959), developer of Mystic Caverns in Arkansas, United States
- Catherine Raney (born 1980), American Olympic speed skater
- Della H. Raney (1912–1987), African-American pioneering Army nurse
- Doug Raney (1956–2016), American jazz guitarist; son of Jimmy Raney
- George P. Raney (1845–1911), American politician and attorney, Chief Justice of the Florida Supreme Court
- Jimmy Raney (1927–1995), American jazz guitarist
- John H. Raney (1849–1928), American politician
- John N. Raney (born 1947), American politician and businessman
- Michele E. Raney (born 1951), American physician and first woman to over winter at an Antarctica inland station
- Murray Raney (1885–1966), American mechanical engineer; inventor of Raney nickel
- Paul Hartley Raney (1892–1917), Canadian fighter pilot killed in World War I
- Reisha Raney, American business executive and engineer
- Ribs Raney (1923–2003), American baseball pitcher
- Robert James Raney (1883–1963), American architect
- Sue Raney, stage name of American jazz singer Raelene Claire Claussen (born 1940)
- Tom Raney, comic-book artist
- Wayne Raney (1921–1993), American country singer and harmonica player
- William Raney (1859–1933), Canadian lawyer, politician and judge

== See also ==
- Raney nickel
- Rainey, a list of people with the surname or given name
- Ranney (disambiguation)
