= Hallidie Building =

- U.S. National Register of Historic Places
- San Francisco Designated Landmark
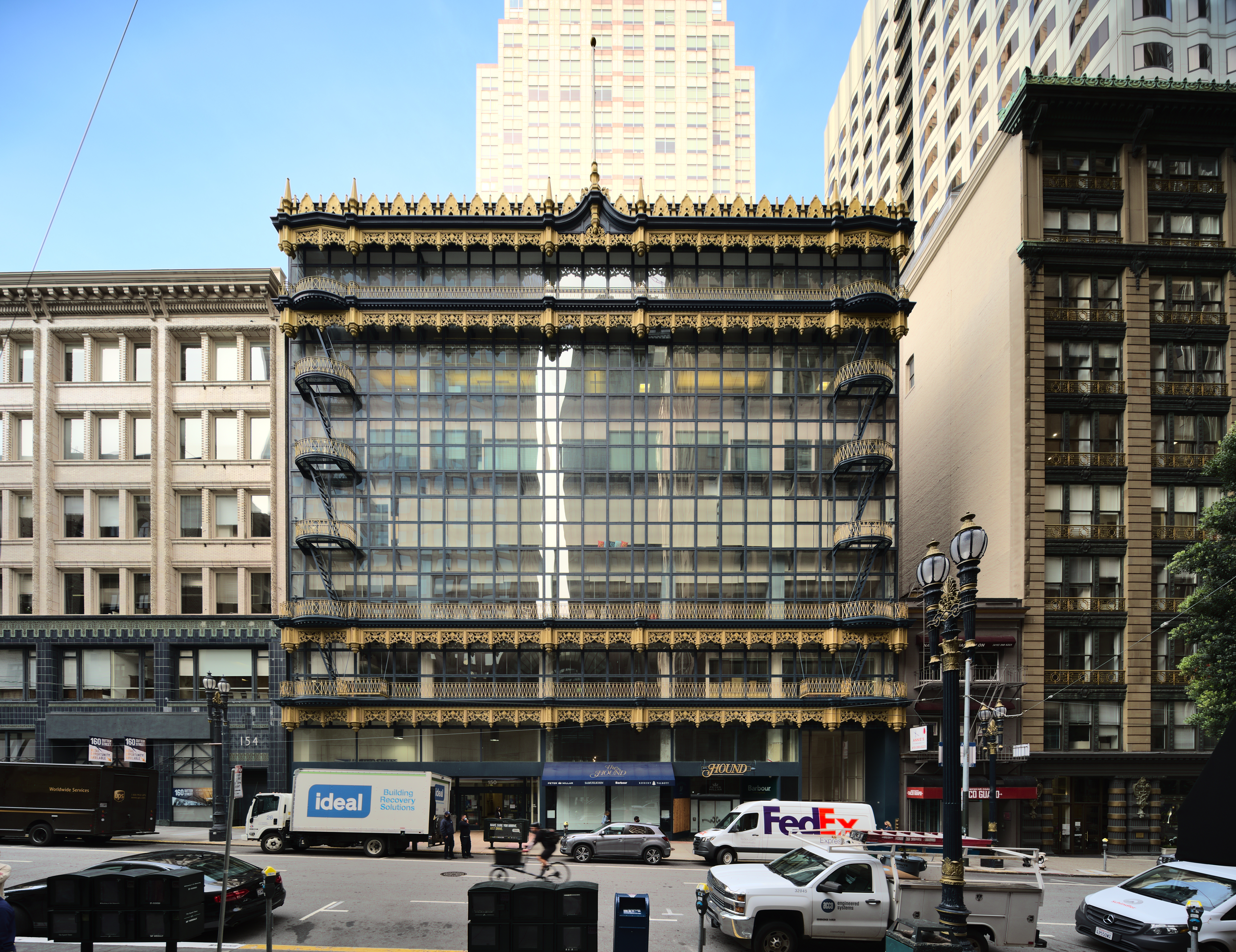
- The Hallidie Building in 2021
- Location: San Francisco, CA
- Coordinates: 37°47′24.07″N 122°24′12.67″W
- Built: 1918
- Architect: Willis Polk
- NRHP reference No.: 71000185
- SFDL No.: 37

Significant dates
- Added to NRHP: November 19, 1971
- Designated SFDL: 1971

The Hallidie Building is an office building in the Financial District of San Francisco, California, at 130 Sutter Street, between Montgomery Street and Kearny Street. Designed by architect Willis Polk and named in honor of San Francisco cable car pioneer Andrew Smith Hallidie, it opened in 1918.

The building is noted especially for its glass facade, symmetrical fire escapes and ornate iron work. The building is one of the country’s first glass curtain walls. While the seven-story building was predated by Louis Curtiss’s 1909 Boley Clothing Company building in Kansas City, Missouri, it is unclear which buildings, if any, served as inspiration for Polk other than The Crystal Palace.

In 1971, the San Francisco Board of Supervisors made the building a historic monument after a bank was considering replacing it with a much taller building.

The building underwent a two-year restoration, which was completed in April 2013, after its sheet metal friezes, cornices, balconies, and fire escapes were deemed unsafe by the City of San Francisco's Department of Building Inspection.

The San Francisco chapter of the American Institute of Architects opened the Center for Architecture + Design in the street-level retail space, which predates the rest of the building, adding a gallery, lecture hall, and cafe in 2023.

== See also ==
- List of San Francisco Designated Landmarks
