= Robert Rainey =

Robert Rainey may refer to:

- Robert M. Rainey (1882–1971), judge in Oklahoma
- Robert E. L. Rainey (1914–2002), American artist, art educator and advertising executive

== See also ==
- Robert Rainie (1860–1945), Scottish rugby union player
- Robert Rainy (1826–1906), Scottish Presbyterian divine
