= Rainey Memorial Gates =

Entrance gate in the Bronx, New York

- U.S. National Register of Historic Places
- New York City Landmark
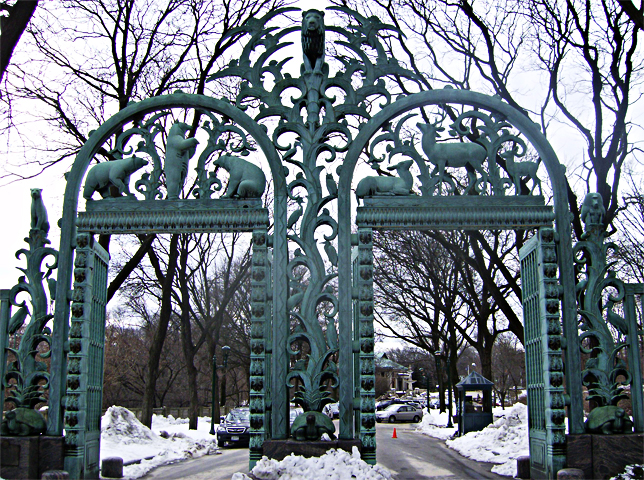

- Location within New York City Location within New York Location within the United States
- Location: Bronx Zoo, Bronx, New York
- Coordinates: 40°51′18″N 73°52′40″W
- Area: less than one acre
- Built: 1934
- Architect: Manship, Paul
- Architectural style: Art Deco
- NRHP reference No.: 72000823
- NYCL No.: 0108

Significant dates
- Added to NRHP: March 16, 1972
- Designated NYCL: January 11, 1967

Rainey Memorial Gates is a historic entrance gate located at the north side of the Bronx Zoo, within Bronx Park in the Bronx, New York City.

It is a New York City designated landmark and was listed on the National Register of Historic Places in 1972.

== History ==
It was built in 1934 and constructed of sculpted bronze in the Art Deco style. It was designed by noted sculptor Paul Manship (1885–1966), who worked on them starting in 1926. It was commissioned by Grace Rainey Rogers, as a memorial to her brother, noted big game hunter Paul James Rainey (1877–1923). The gates feature stylized animal and plant life including the figure of a seated lion. Low bronze screens flank the gate and connect it to the granite gatekeepers lodges.

Photographs of the gates from 2018 by Carol M. Highsmith are part of the files at the Library of Congress.

== See also ==
- List of New York City Designated Landmarks in The Bronx
- National Register of Historic Places in Bronx County, New York
