= Glick–Orr House =

Historic house in Kansas, United States

- U.S. National Register of Historic Places
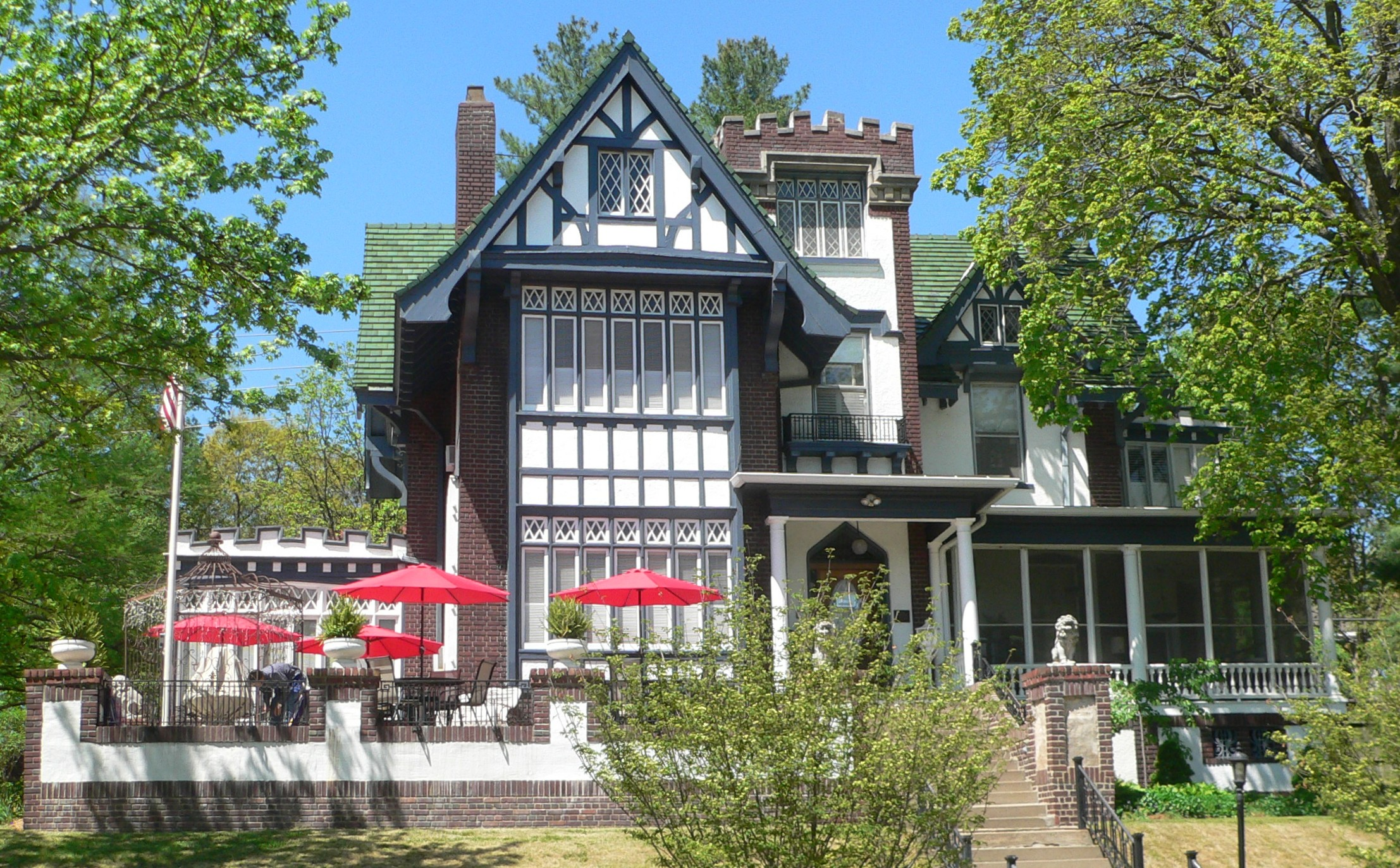

- Location within Kansas Location within the United States
- Location: 503 N. Second St., Atchison, Kansas
- Coordinates: 39.566428°N 95.115516°W
- Architect: Curtiss, Louis
- Architectural style: Tudor Revival
- NRHP reference No.: 92000060
- Added to NRHP: February 26, 1992

The Glick–Orr House in Atchison, Kansas was built in 1913. It was designed by architect Louis Curtiss. It was listed on the National Register of Historic Places in 1992.

As of 2015, the house was operated as a bed and breakfast, under the name "Glick Mansion". The Glick–Orr House was operated as the TUCK U INN at Glick Mansion Bed & Breakfast, by innkeepers Chris and Loman Wildy. It had been a B & B for 22 years, until Aaron Gassaway had bought it in June 2022. It has now been rented out to college students in Atchison, still known as the Glick Mansion.
