= Ranney =

Ranney may refer to:

== People ==
- Ambrose Ranney (1821–1899), Massachusetts politician
- Art Ranney, co-founder (1920) of the American Professional Football Association (now the National Football League)
- Helen Ranney (1920–2010), American physician who researched sickle-cell anemia
- J. Austin Ranney (1920–2006), American political scientist
- Justin W. Ranney (1821–1898), Wisconsin state senator
- Karen Ranney, American author of historical romance novels
- Rufus P. Ranney (1813–1891), Ohio politician
- Waitstill R. Ranney (1791–1853), Vermont physician and politician
- William Ranney (1813–1857), American painter

== Other ==
- Neighborhood of Pleasant Prairie, Wisconsin
- Ranney Bridge, bridge in Essex County, New York
- Ranney collector, type of radial well
- Ranney Index, United States political measurement
- Ranney Nunatak, Antarctic nunatak
- Ranney School, private New Jersey school

== See also ==
- Rainey
- Raney
