= Boley Building =

- U.S. National Register of Historic Places
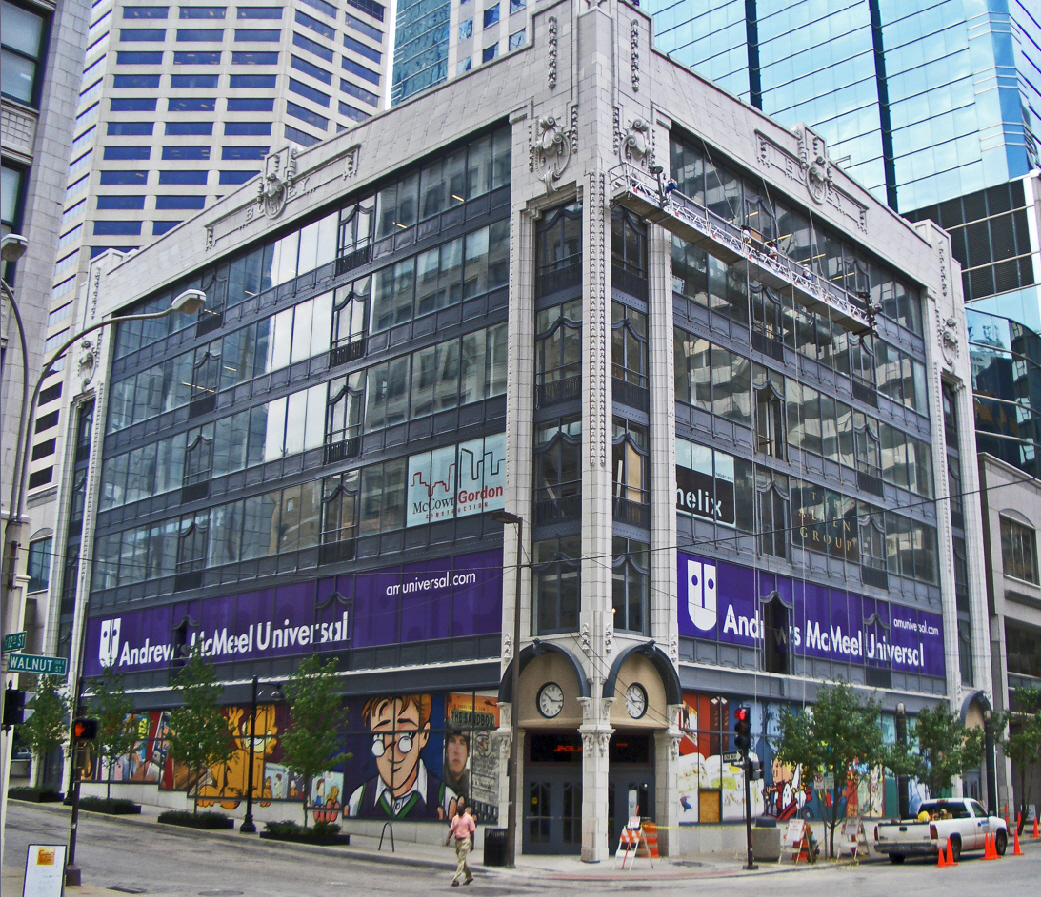
- Boley Clothing Company Building, Kansas City, Missouri.

- Location within Missouri Location within the United States
- Location: 1130 Walnut St., Kansas City, Missouri
- Coordinates: 39°6′0″N 94°34′56″W
- Area: 9.9 acres (4.0 ha)
- Built: 1909
- Architect: Louis Curtiss
- Architectural style: Metal & Glass Curtain-Wall
- NRHP reference No.: 71000467
- Added to NRHP: March 9, 1971

The Boley Building in Kansas City, Missouri was designed by Canadian-born American architect Louis Curtiss and built in 1909. It was listed on the National Register of Historic Places in 1971. It is the world headquarters for Andrews McMeel Universal, parent company to Andrews McMeel Syndication, Andrews McMeel Publishing and GoComics.

== Architecture ==
The six-story steel frame building was constructed in 1909 and was designed in the Art-Nouveau style by architect Louis Curtiss. The building is one of the world's first metal-and-glass curtain-wall buildings and the first to use rolled-steel columns. It was listed on the National Register of Historic Places in 1971.

The six-story building also features cantilever floor slabs, cast iron structural detailing, and terra cotta decorative elements. The interior of the building features many of the comic strips and other publications from Andrews McMeel Publishing including Calvin and Hobbes and Doonesbury.

== See also ==
- Hallidie Building
