= Louis Curtiss Studio Building =

- Curtiss, Louis, Studio Building
- U.S. National Register of Historic Places
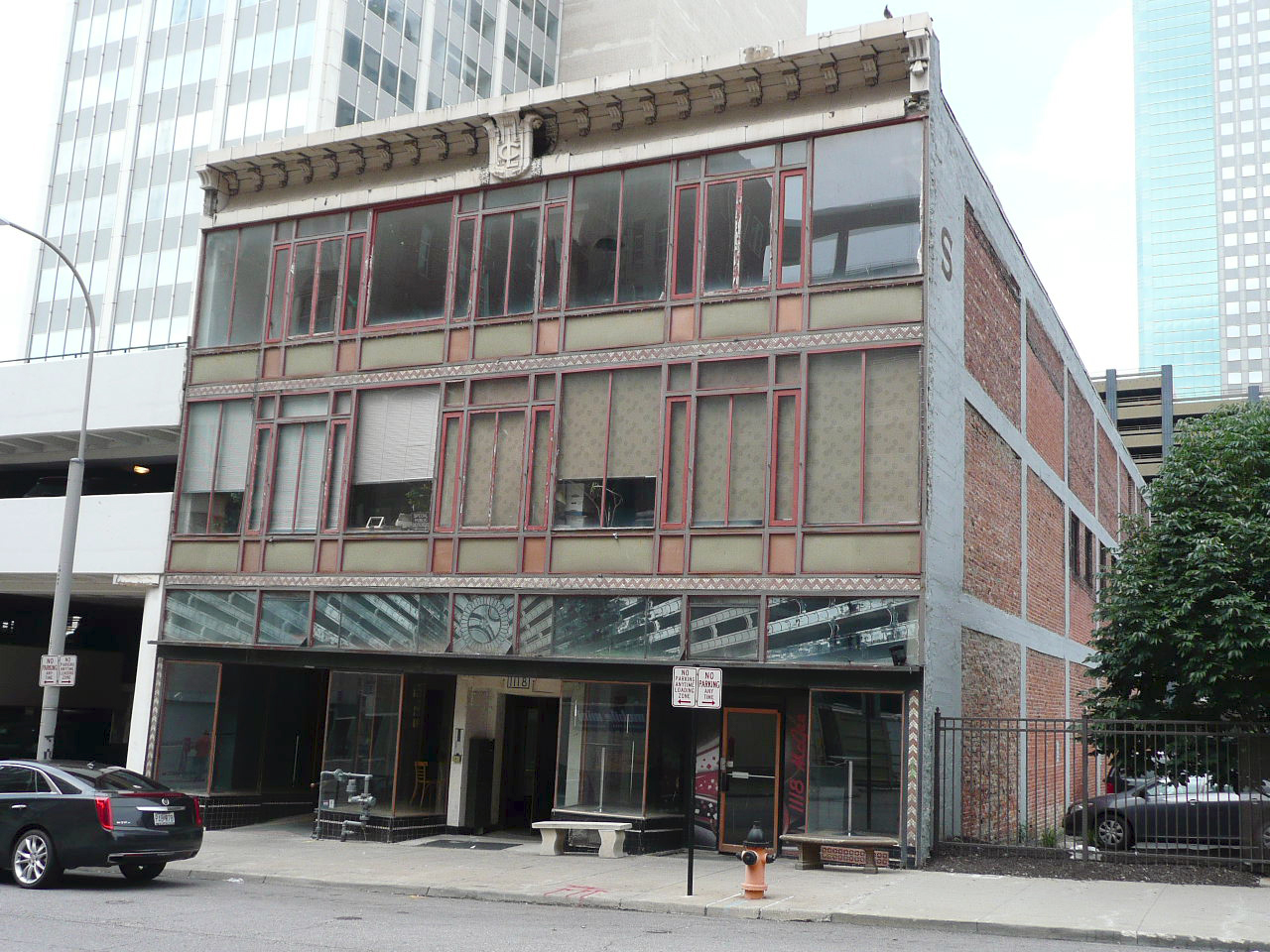

- Location within Missouri Location within the United States
- Location: 1116–1120 McGee St., Kansas City, Missouri
- Coordinates: 39°5′48″N 94°34′45″W
- Area: less than one acre
- Built: 1909
- Architect: Louis Curtiss
- Architectural style: Glass Curtain Wall
- NRHP reference No.: 72000716
- Added to NRHP: June 19, 1972

The Louis Curtiss Studio Building is a three-story building in Kansas City, Missouri listed on the National Register of Historic Places.

The studio was built in 1909. It was designed by architect Louis Curtiss and served as his studio. It was listed on the U.S. National Register of Historic Places in 1972.

Curtiss died in 1924 at his studio residence in downtown Kansas City, Missouri.
