= Joplin Union Depot =

- U.S. National Register of Historic Places
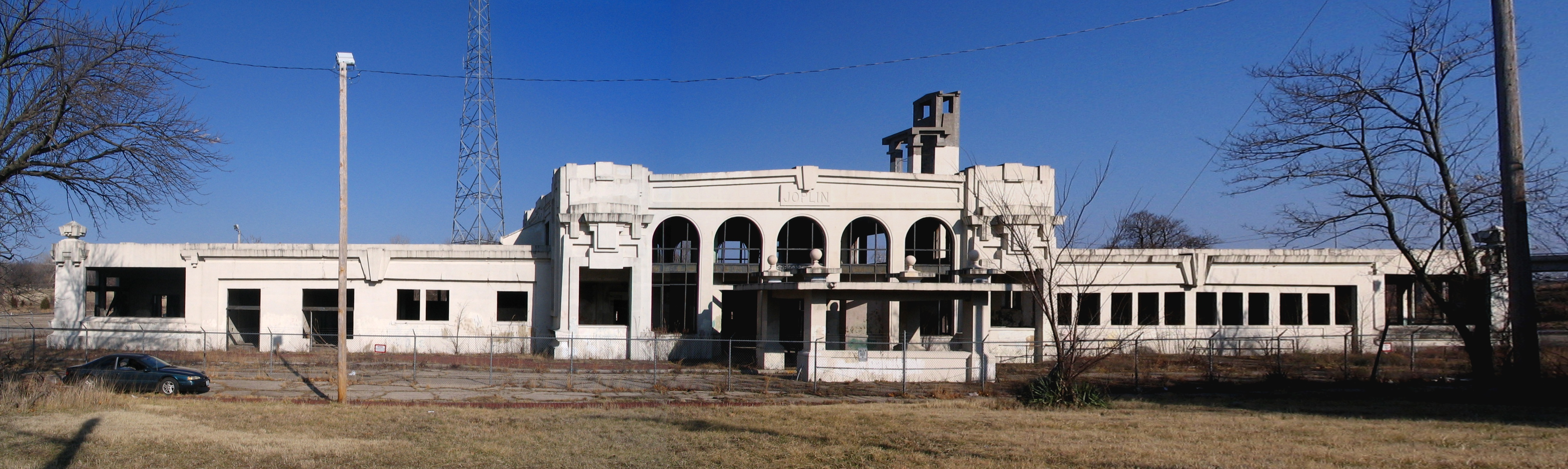
- Building in 2010

- Location within Missouri Location within the United States
- Location: Broadway and Main St., Joplin, Missouri 37°5′30″N 94°30′42″W
- Coordinates: 37°5′30″N 94°30′42″W
- Area: 5 acres (2.0 ha)
- Built: 1911
- Architect: Curtiss, Louis
- NRHP reference No.: 73001043
- Added to NRHP: March 14, 1973

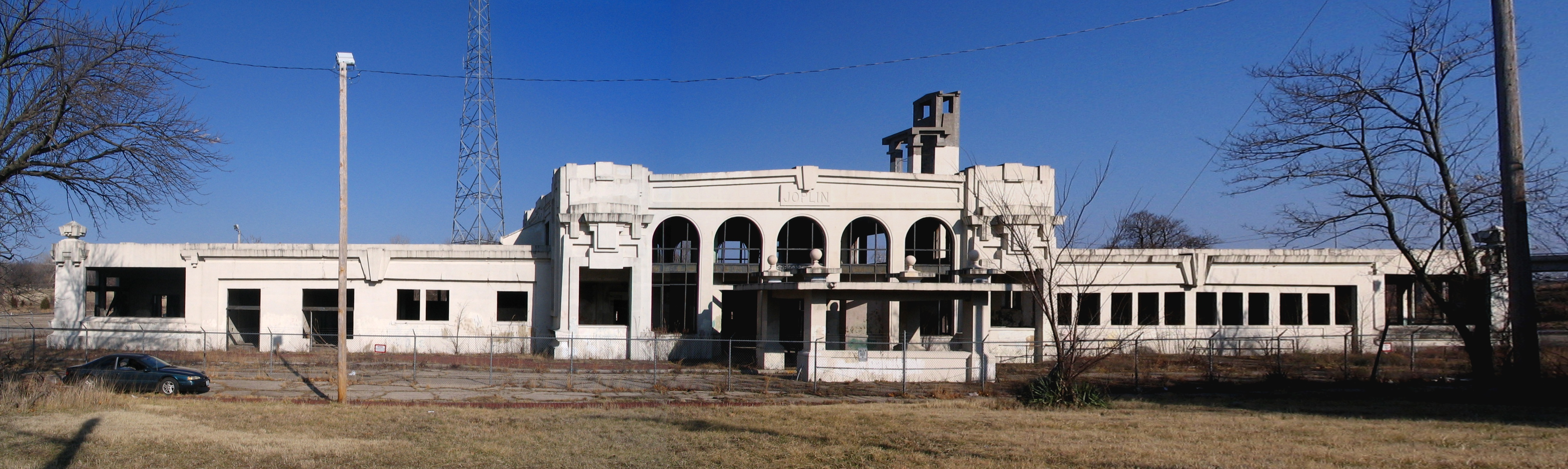
Joplin-Union-Station

The Joplin Union Depot is a historic railroad station located at Joplin, Jasper County, Missouri. The station was served by a number of railroads, two of which were the Kansas City Southern Railway and the Missouri-Kansas-Texas Railroad. The station was completed in July 1911. On November 4, 1969, the last train, the Southern Belle visited the station, ending 58 years of constant service. After train service ended, the station slowly deteriorated. Designed by the Canadian-born architect Louis Curtiss, the station was featured in the January 1912 edition of Popular Mechanics for its use of mining waste in the concrete.

On March 14, 1973, the station was entered into the National Register of Historic Places. It is currently unoccupied. There are currently plans to restore the depot. There have been many ideas for its use, but none have been made certain. This would tie in with the revitalization of downtown.

On October 20, 2021, the station was listed as a Place In Peril by Missouri Preservation, a statewide organization advocating for the preservation of architectural and historic landmarks.

Joplin Union Depot supporters announced on May 4, 2022, plans for a national marketing effort to find an interested party to restore and use the 110-year-old station.

Preceding station	Kansas City Southern Railway	Following station
Gulfton toward Kansas City	Main Line	Saginaw toward Port Arthur
Preceding station	Missouri–Kansas–Texas Railroad	Following station
Dalena toward Junction City	Junction City – Joplin	Terminus
