= Auto Coach Building =

- U.S. National Register of Historic Places
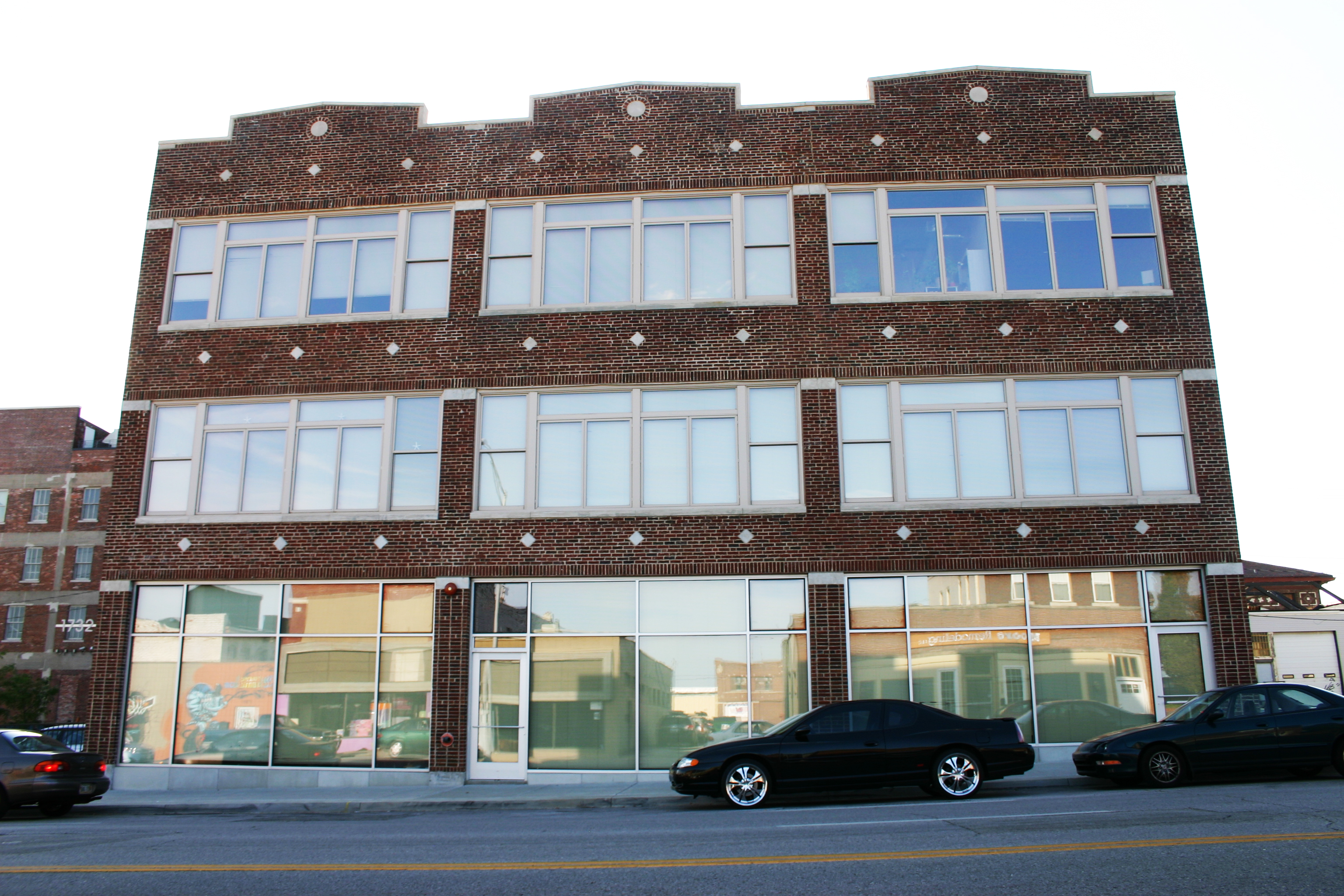

- Location within Missouri Location within the United States
- Location: 1730-34 Oak St., Kansas City, Missouri
- Coordinates: 39°5′32″N 94°34′45″W
- Area: less than one acre
- Built: 1917, 1926
- Architect: Raney & Botkin; Bryant, E.L.
- Architectural style: Late 19th And Early 20th Century American Movements
- NRHP reference No.: 07000328
- Added to NRHP: April 18, 2007

The Auto Coach Building, at 1730-34 Oak St. in Kansas City, Missouri, was built in two phases in 1917 and 1926. It was listed on the National Register of Historic Places in 2007.

It is a three-story, brick and stone, two part commercial block, 75 by 125 feet (23 m × 38 m) in plan.

It was part of Kansas City's "Automobile Row" which, in the early 1900s, included auto dealerships, parts suppliers, rubber tire manufacturers, and other automotive related firms.
