= Bernard Corrigan House =

Historic house in Missouri, United States

- U.S. National Register of Historic Places
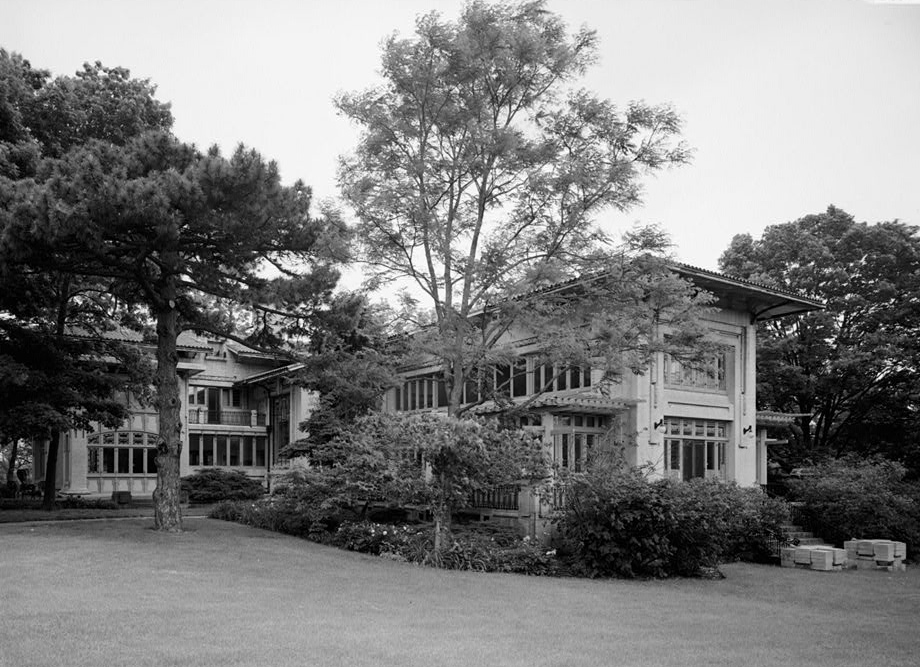
- Bernard Corrigan House viewed from the southeast

- Location within Missouri Location within the United States
- Location: 1200 W. 55th St., Kansas City, Missouri
- Coordinates: 39°1′42″N 94°36′13″W
- Built: 1912
- Built by: Corrigan, Bernard, Co.
- Architect: Louis Curtiss
- Architectural style: Prairie School
- NRHP reference No.: 78001653
- Added to NRHP: January 18, 1978

The Bernard Corrigan House is a historic residence at 1200 West 55th Street in the Country Club District, Kansas City, Missouri. The building is an important regional example of the Prairie Style, and it was one of the earliest residential structures in Kansas City to make extensive use of reinforced concrete. It was added to the National Register of Historic Places in 1978.

== History ==
Bernard Corrigan was born in Quebec in 1847, and he moved to Kansas City in 1858. Corrigan built his fortune as a contractor, street railway magnate, and real estate speculator. He hired architect Louis S. Curtiss to design his grand estate at the corner of 55th Street and Ward Parkway. Corrigan's own firm served as the contractor for the project, and construction began on the home in 1912. The house was completed the following year, but Corrigan died suddenly in January 1913, only two months before he was scheduled to move into his new house. Corrigan's widow sold the property to Patrick J. White in 1914 for $101,370.86. White owned the property until 1917, when he sold it to Joseph J. Heim.

Joseph J. Heim was originally from St. Louis, Missouri, where he learned the techniques of brewing. Heim came to Kansas City in 1884 where he began building his brewery empire. By 1901, the Heim Brewery in the East Bottoms had become the largest brewery in Kansas City, producing in excess of 140,000 barrels annually. Heim and his brothers also opened an amusement park near the brewery in 1899. The amusement park featured Heim beer piped in directly from the nearby brewery. Heim was also involved with numerous other business ventures including real estate, banking, street railways, and telephone companies. Heim lived in the Corrigan for only six and a half years. He sold the house when his wife died.

Robert Sutherland acquired the home from Heim in 1923 for $90,000. Sutherland was a native of the state of Kansas, who moved to Kansas City at age sixteen and began working in a lumber yard. Sutherland began to acquire numerous lumber yards in the early 1900s, which brought him considerable fortune. Sutherland died in 1941, but his widow continued to own and reside in the Corrigan House.

== Architecture ==
=== Exterior ===
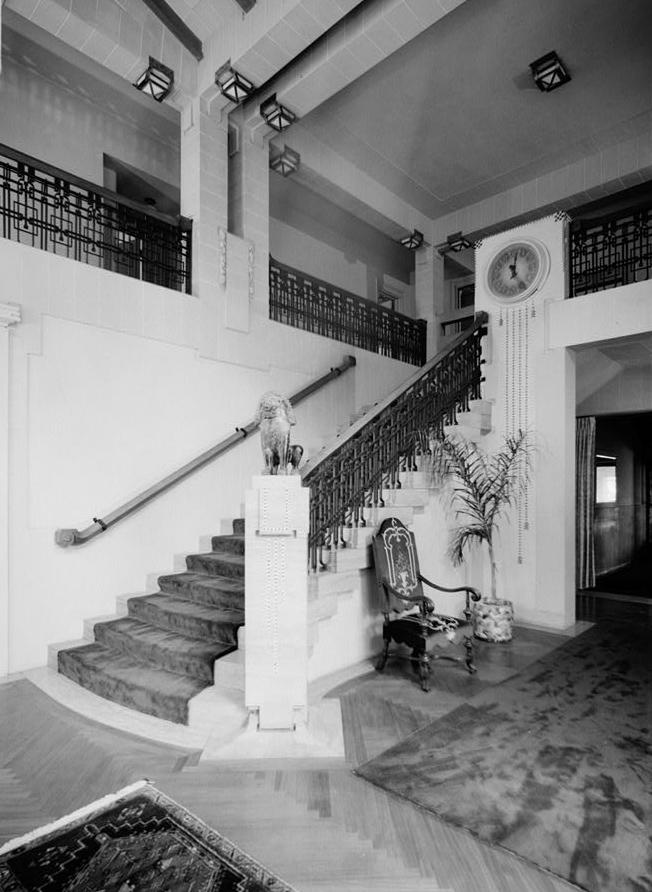
Stairway in the first-floor main hall

While the house incorporates elements from several architectural styles, the most obvious elements are in the Prairie Style architecture, particularly in the emphasis on horizontal lines in the composition. The house is a three-story structure built over a full basement, and it is about one hundred feet (30 m) long from north to south. The foundation is reinforced concrete, and the exterior walls are faced with gray shot-sawn limestone from Carthage, Missouri. The actual maker of the art glass used in numerous windows and doors is unknown, but the glass itself was most likely supplied by the Kokomo Opalescent Glass Works of Kokomo, Indiana.

=== Interior ===
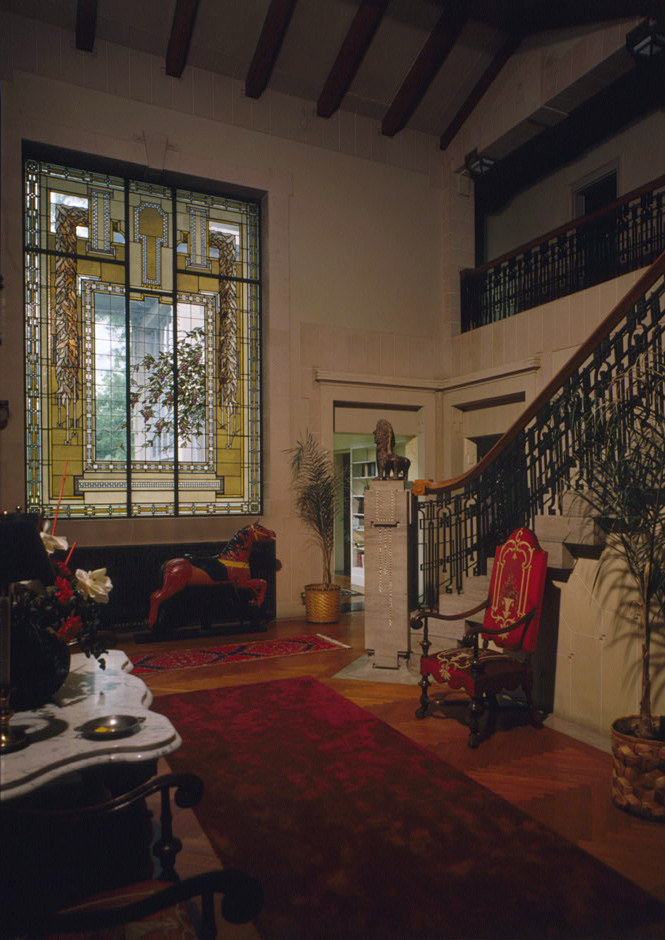
Stained glass and stairway in the first-floor main hall

The full basement contains laundry, heating, and cooling facilities.

The first floor entrance hall features two expanses of stained glass. The ceiling of the hall is two stories, with oak beams lining the ceiling. The main staircase is located in the main entrance hall. The east wing of the first floor contains the living room with large marble fireplace and the conservatory. The west wing contains the kitchen, dining room, butler's pantry, parlor, and a secondary staircase.

The second floor contains at least five bedrooms and two bathrooms.

The third floor originally contained a game room, additional servants quarters, and storage space.
