= Paul J. Rainey =

American businessman, philanthropist, hunter, and photographer

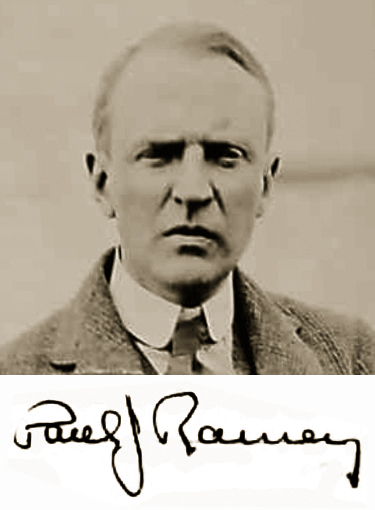
Photograph and signature of Paul J Rainey

Paul James Rainey (September 18, 1877 – September 18, 1923) was an American businessman, philanthropist, filmmaker, hunter, and photographer. He made films about his hunts in Africa. Gates at the Bronx Zoological park were commissioned in his memory and a preserve established in Louisiana.

== Early life ==
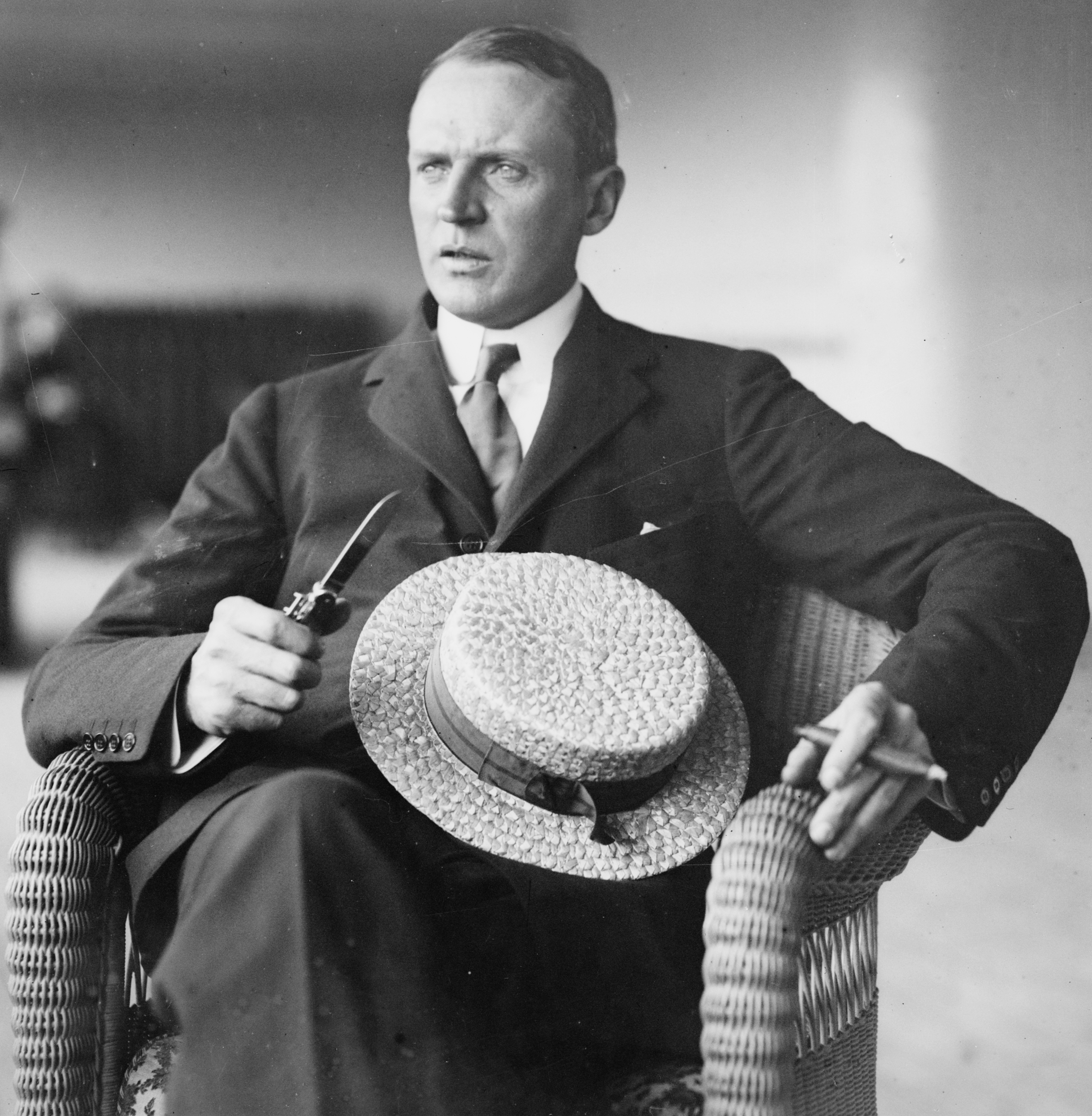
Rainey between 1910 and 1915

Paul James Rainey was born September 18, 1877, in Cleveland, Ohio, the fifth of Eleanor Beatty (née Mitchell) and William Joab Rainey's five children. His sister was Grace Rainey Rogers.

== Life ==
Scion of a wealthy family whose fortune came from coal and coke production, Rainey earned a reputation as a playboy. He invested in numerous personal projects, including his Tippah Lodge in Mississippi, a hotel, prize horses, and private railroad cars.

Although he owned other residences, he favored Tippah Lodge, his sprawling estate in rural Mississippi.

Rainey was active with the American Geographical Society, American Museum of Natural History, the New York Zoological Society, and the Smithsonian Institution, among other organizations.

Rejected by the military for health reasons, Rainey purchased an ambulance and drove it on the Western Front during World War I.

== African expedition films ==
=== Paul J. Rainey's African Hunt ===
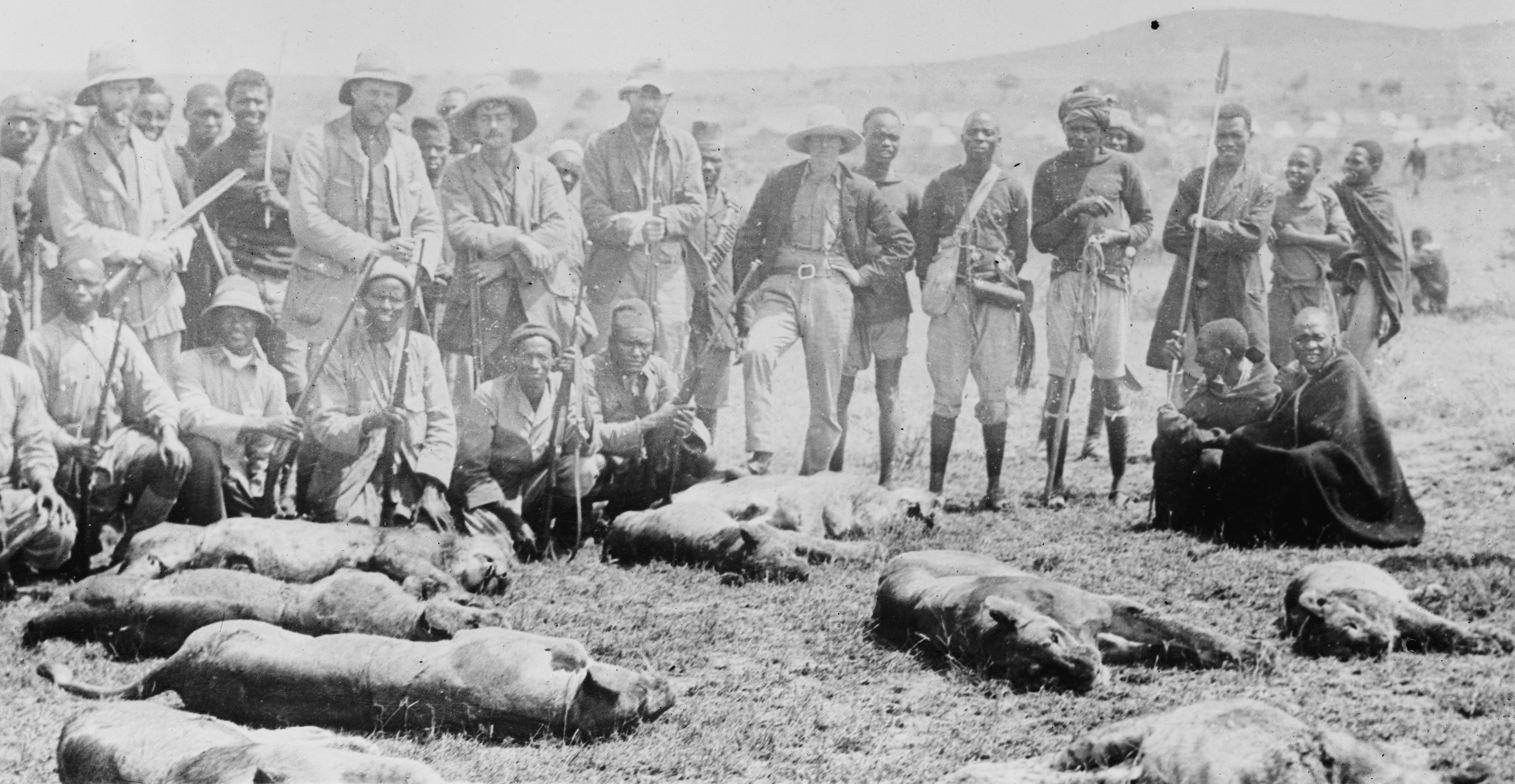
Lion slaughter, all killed in 15 minutes, on Paul Rainey's African hunt between 1910 and 1915

After the war, Rainey hunted big game in Africa. He and his team filmed some of the earliest film footage of African animals in the wild. In 1912, they released the six-reel documentary film Paul J. Rainey's African Hunt.

Rainey's silent film grossed over a half-million dollars (equivalent to $16,681,034 in 2025), an extraordinary sum for an early motion picture. It was one of the most successful non-fiction films of the decade. Rainey's safari team included a photographer and a taxidermist from the Smithsonian Institution. The success of Rainey's films led to a boom in expedition and nature films. These were silent films, so many of these films were at first presented by a lecturer in a lyceum-like context.

The Library of Congress has a copy of the film in its paper print collection. Producer Joseph P. Bickerton, Jr. organized the Jungle Film Corporation to buy and commercialize Rainey's African hunt footage. These films were the first motion pictures to be produced at regular theater prices and were successful in the US and abroad.

=== Heart of the Jungle ===
Rainey's five-reel African expedition film Heart of the Jungle was playing in US theaters during 1919. Edward Bernays's pioneering public relations firm publicized it. A promotional newspaper article said that Heart of the Jungle included footage of lions, buffalo, and rhinoceroses. The article also described an introduction with footage of the Arctic, the Forbidden City, and "Czecho-Slovaks crossing Siberia" (Rainey served as the official photographer for the Czech army in Sibera).

== Death and burial ==
He died on his forty-sixth birthday in 1923 of a cerebral hemorrhage. The death occurred while Rainey was en route from England to South Africa, where he had planned to hunt. He was buried at sea.

== Legacy ==
After his death, Rainey's family set aside 26,000 acres (110 km^{2}) of his marshland as a wildfowl refuge in coastal south Louisiana. The refuge, known as the Paul J. Rainey Wildlife Sanctuary, is owned by the National Audubon Society. His sister, Grace Rainey Rogers commissioned the Rainey Memorial Gates at the Bronx Zoo in Bronx Park, New York City, as a memorial.

== See also ==
- List of famous big game hunters
