= Grace Rainey Rogers =

American art collector, philanthropist (1867–1943)

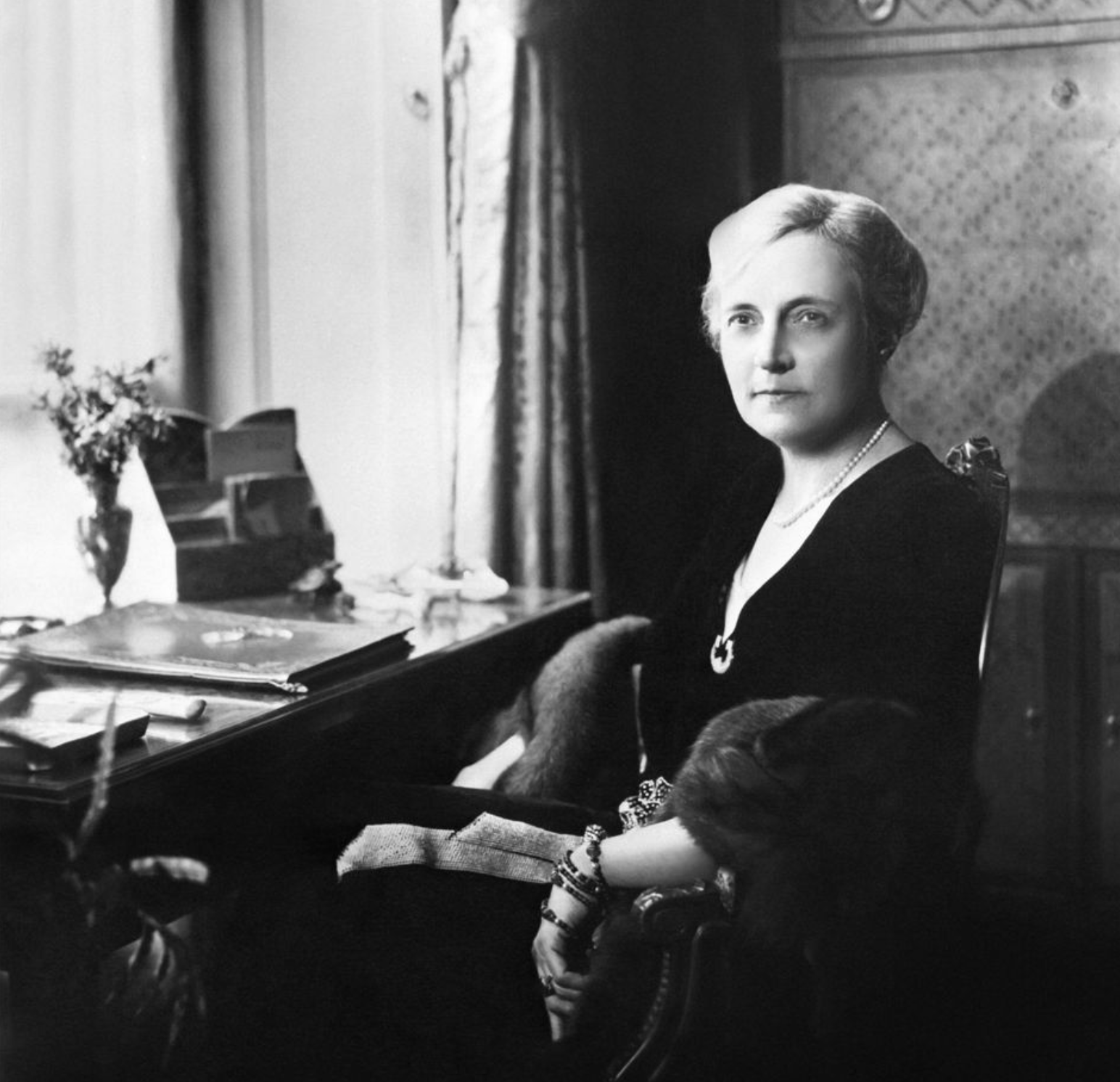
- Grace Rainey Rogers in the 1920s
- Born: Grace Rainey; June 28, 1867; Cleveland, Ohio, U.S.
- Died: May 9, 1943; Greenwich, Connecticut, U.S.
- Burial place: Lake View Cemetery, Cleveland, Ohio, U.S.
- Occupations: Art collector, arts philanthropist
- Spouse: Henry Welsh Rogers (1907–1918; divorced)
- Relatives: Paul James Rainey (brother)

Grace Rainey Rogers (June 28, 1867 – May 9, 1943) was an American art patron, art collector, and arts philanthropist. She donated money to the Cleveland Museum of Art, the Metropolitan Museum of Art, and the Museum of Modern Art; and is the namesake of many buildings in the United States. Rogers was the daughter of industrialist businessman, William J. Rainey (1836–1900), and Eleanor B. (née Mitchell) Rainey (1842–1905). Paul James Rainey was her brother.
