= Louis Curtiss =

American architect (1865–1924)

- Born: July 1, 1865; Belleville, Ontario
- Died: June 24, 1924 (aged 58); Kansas City, Missouri
- Occupation: Architect
- Parent(s): Frances Elvira Deaver Crowell Curtis; Don Carlos Curtis
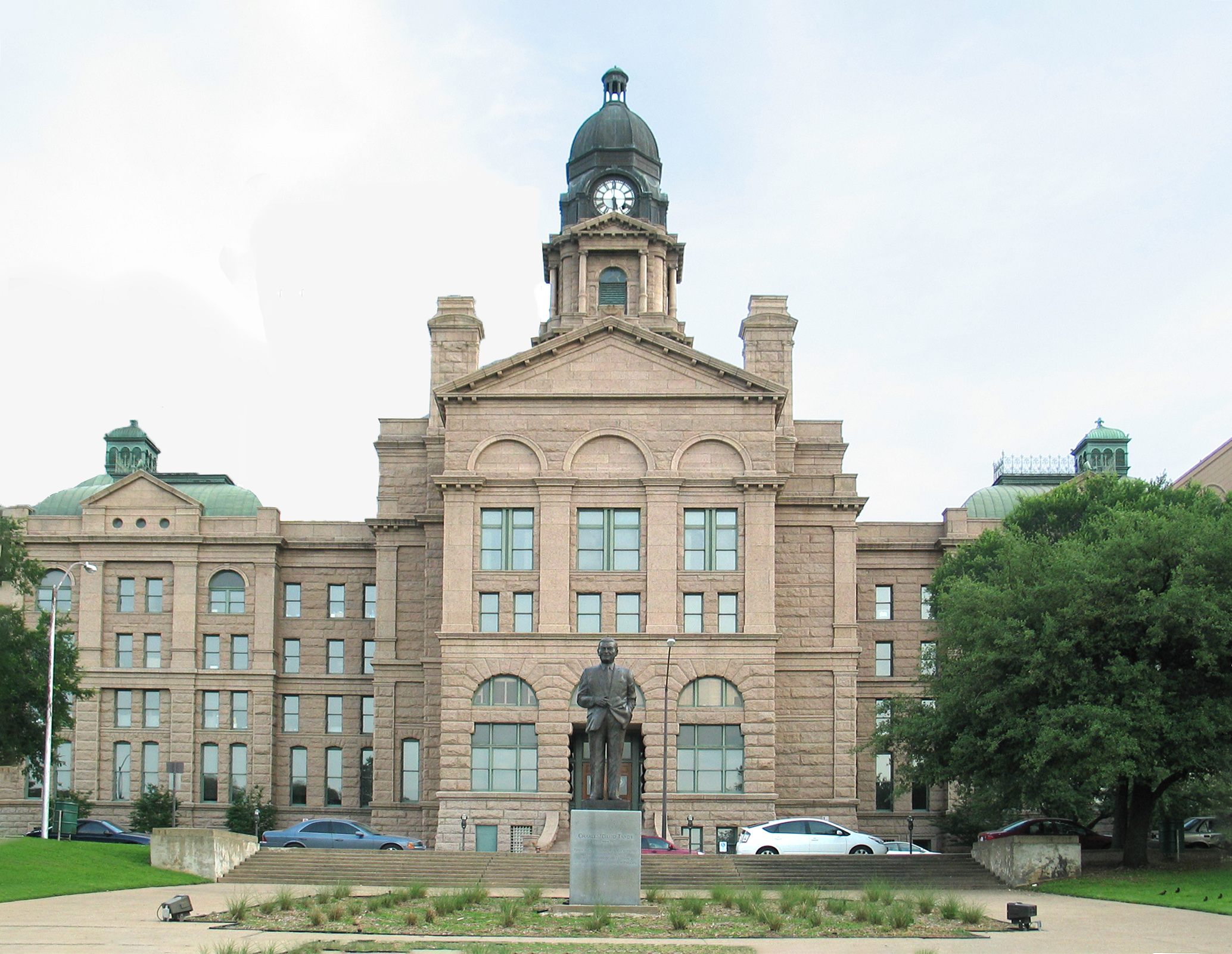
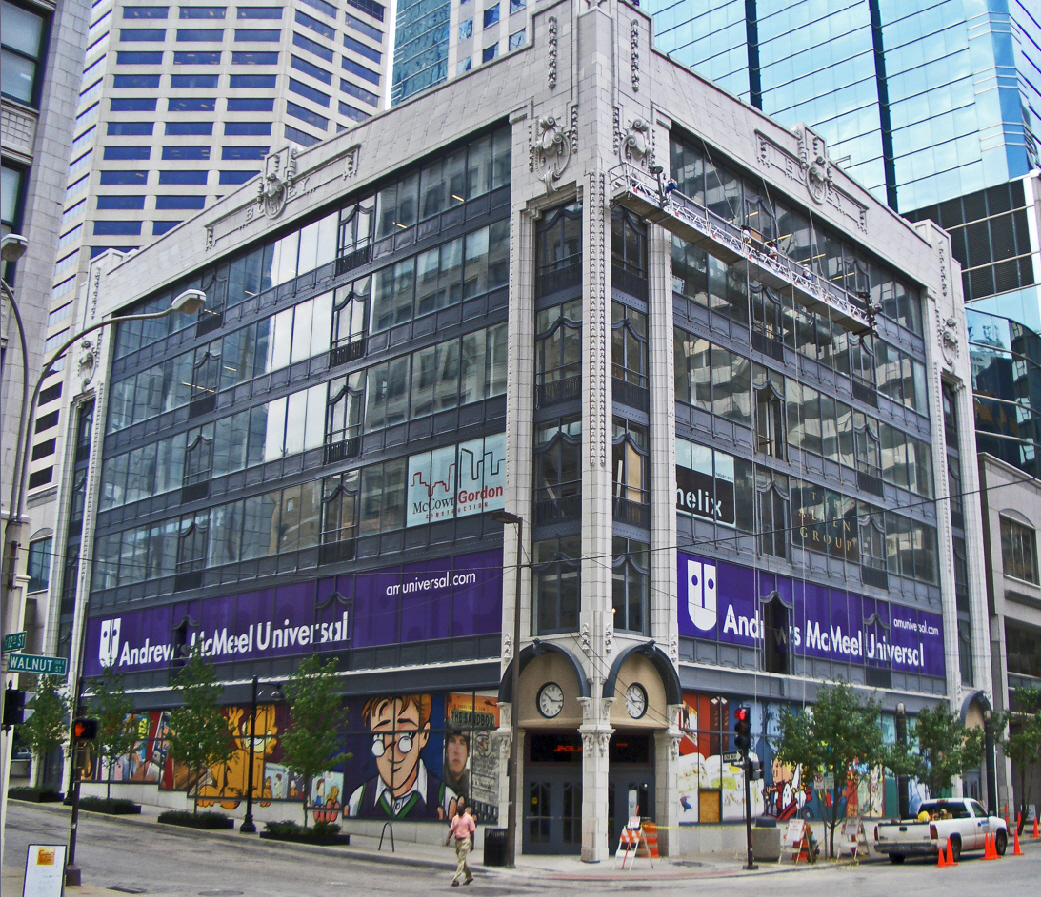
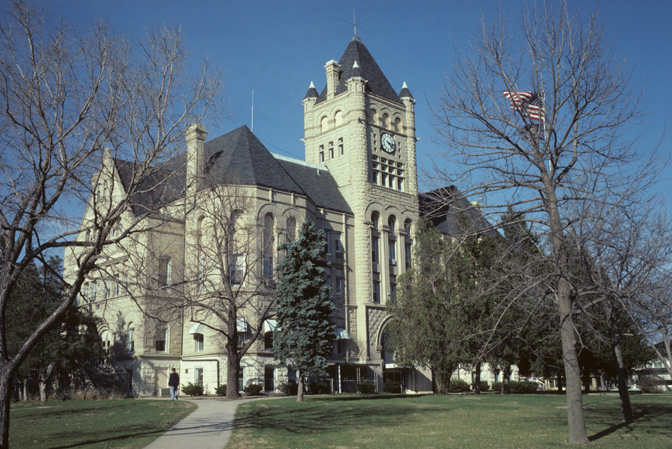
- Buildings: Tarrant County Courthouse Tarrant County Courthouse; Fort Worth, Texas; added to the National Register of Historic Places October 15, 1970 Boley Clothing Company Building Boley Clothing Company Building (1909), Kansas City, Missouri; one of the world's first glass curtain-wall structures. Gage County Courthouse Gage County Courthouse in Beatrice, Nebraska; added to the National Register of Historic Places January 10, 1990 Henry County Courthouse; Missouri State Building, World's Columbian Exposition; William Rockhill Nelson residence

Louis Singleton Curtiss (July 1, 1865 – June 24, 1924) was a Canadian-born American architect. Notable as a pioneer of the curtain wall design, he was once described as "the Frank Lloyd Wright of Kansas City". In his career, he designed more than 200 buildings, though not all were realized. There are approximately 30 examples of his work still extant in Kansas City, Missouri where Curtiss spent his career, including his best known design, the Boley Clothing Company Building. Other notable works can be found throughout the American midwest.

== Life and career ==
Curtiss was born in Belleville, Ontario, Canada. He studied architecture at the University of Toronto and in Paris before coming to Kansas City, Missouri, in 1887. In 1889, he began an architectural partnership with Frederick C. Gunn that produced over a dozen buildings. When the partnership dissolved in 1899, Curtiss, age 34, continued as a solo architect.

Curtiss designed the Boley Clothing Company Building in Kansas City, which is renowned as "one of the first glass curtain wall structures in the world." The six-story building also features cantilever floor slabs, cast iron structural detailing, and terra cotta decorative elements. The Historic American Buildings Survey described Curtiss' residence for Bernard Corrigan as "an important regional example of the Prairie Style" and "among the earliest residential structures in Kansas City to make extensive use of reinforced concrete."

Curtiss designed several buildings for the Fred Harvey Company including the 1906 El Bisonte Hotel in Hutchinson, Kansas, the 1907 Harvey House and hotel in Emporia, Kansas, the 1907 Harvey House and hotel in Wellington, Kansas, the 1908 Sequoyah Harvey House Hotel in Syracuse, Kansas, and the 1909 El Ortiz Hotel in Lamy, New Mexico.

Other Curtiss railroad architecture included the 1910–1912 Union Terminal in Wichita, Kansas, the 1909–1911 Santa Fe Railroad depot in Sweetwater, Texas, the 1909–1911 Santa Fe Railroad depot in Lubbock, Texas, the 1909–1911 Santa Fe Railroad depot in Snyder, Texas, the 1909–1911 Santa Fe Railroad depot in Post, Texas, and the 1910–1911 Joplin Union Depot in Joplin, Missouri. A number of his works are listed on the United States National Register of Historic Places.

Curtiss died in 1924 at his studio residence in downtown Kansas City, Missouri. He never married.

== Works ==
- Boley Clothing Company Building, Kansas City, MO, NRHP-listed
- Bernard Corrigan House, 1200 W. 55th St. Kansas City, MO (Curtis, Louis), NRHP-listed
- Glick-Orr House, 503 N. Second St. Atchison, KS (Curtiss, Louis), NRHP-listed
- Harvey House and hotel in Emporia, Kansas,
- El Bisonte Hotel, Hutchinson, Kansas,
- Sequoyah House Harvey House hotel, Syracuse, Kansas, 1908.
- Norman Tromanhauser House, 3603 W. Roanoke Dr. Kansas City, MO (Curtiss, Louis S.), NRHP-listed
- Western Branch, National Home for Disabled Volunteer Soldiers, US 73 Leavenworth, KS (Curtiss, Louis, et al.), NRHP-listed
- Santa Fe depot and Harvey House and hotel in Wellington, Kansas,
- Union Terminal in Wichita, Kansas, which is the 1910-1912 Union Terminal in Wichita, Kansas
- Santa Fe Railroad depot in Sweetwater, Texas 1909–1911
- Santa Fe Railroad depot in Lubbock, Texas, 1909–1911
- Santa Fe Railroad depot in Snyder, Texas, 1909–1911
- Santa Fe Railroad depot in Post, Texas, 1909–1911
- Joplin Union Depot on South Main Street at West A Street in Joplin, Missouri, from 1910–1911 (Curtiss, Louis), NRHP-listed
- Argyle Building, 306 E. 12th St. Kansas City, MO (Curtiss, Louis; Arthur S. Keene), NRHP-listed
- Mineral Hall, 4340 Oak St. Kansas City, MO (Curtiss, Louis S.), NRHP-listed
- Standard Theatre, 300 W. 12th St. Kansas City, MO (Curtiss, Louis S.), NRHP-listed
- Louis Curtiss Studio Building, 1116–1120 McGee St. Kansas City, MO (Curtiss, Louis), NRHP-listed
- El Ortiz Hotel in Lamy, New Mexico
- St. Louis, Brownsville and Mexico Railway office building, Kingsville, Texas, 1912
- St. Louis–San Francisco Railway depot, 300 West Main Street, Ada, Oklahoma, 1913.
- One or more buildings in East Douglas Avenue Historic District, roughly bounded by Topeka, Rock Island, 1st, and English Sts. Wichita, KS (Curtiss, Louis S.), NRHP-listed
- One or more buildings in Excelsior Springs Hall of Waters Commercial East Historic District, roughly along portions of East and West Broadway and Main St. Excelsior Springs, MO (Curtiss, Louis S.), NRHP-listed
- One or more buildings in Muskogee Depot and Freight District, roughly bounded by Columbus Ave., S. Main St., Elgin Ave., and S 5th St. Muskogee, OK (Curtiss, Louis), NRHP-listed
- One or more buildings in Quality Hill historic district, roughly bounded by Broadway, 10th, 14th, and Jefferson Sts. Kansas City, MO (Curtiss, Louis S.), NRHP-listed
- One or more buildings in Westheight Manor District, bounded roughly by 18th and 24th Sts., Oakland and State Aves. Kansas City, KS (Curtiss, Louis), NRHP-listed
- One or more buildings in Westheight Manor Historic District (Boundary Increase), roughly bounded by State and Wood Aves., 18th and 25th Sts. Kansas City, KS (Curtis, Louis), NRHP-listed

== Gallery ==
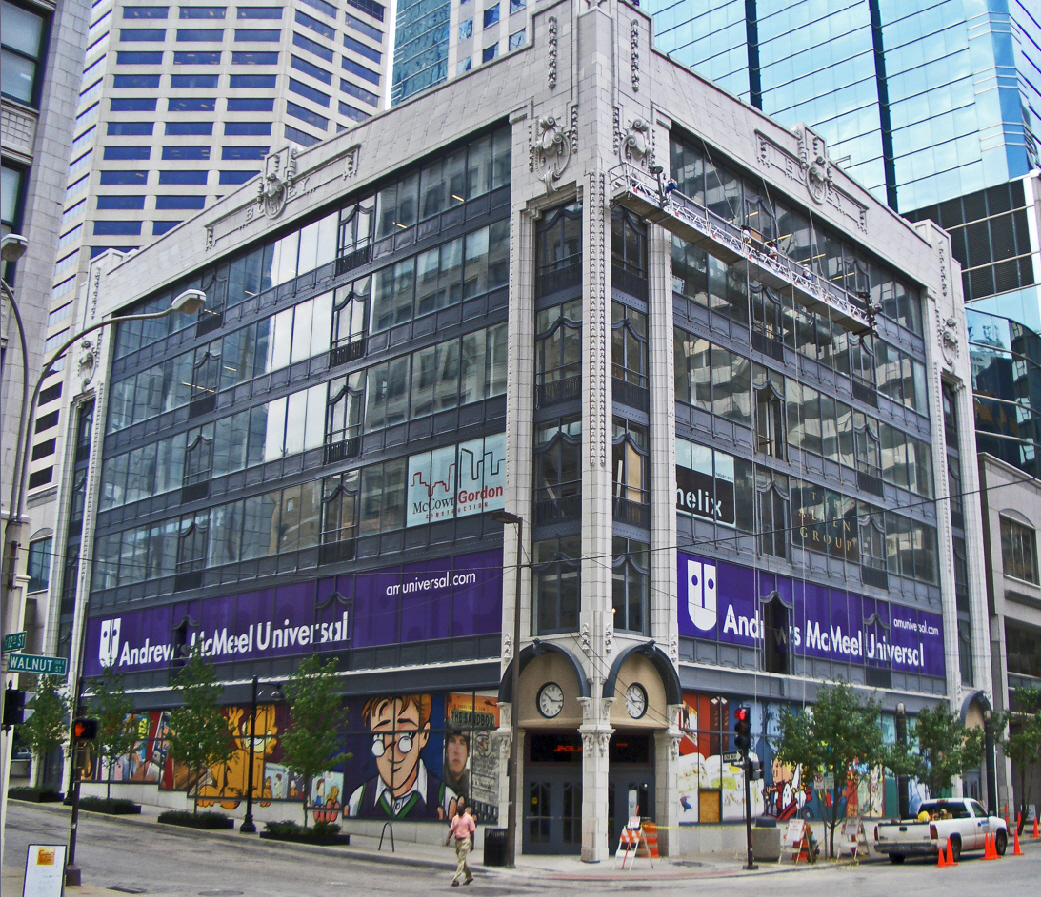
Boley Clothing Company Building, Kansas City, Missouri

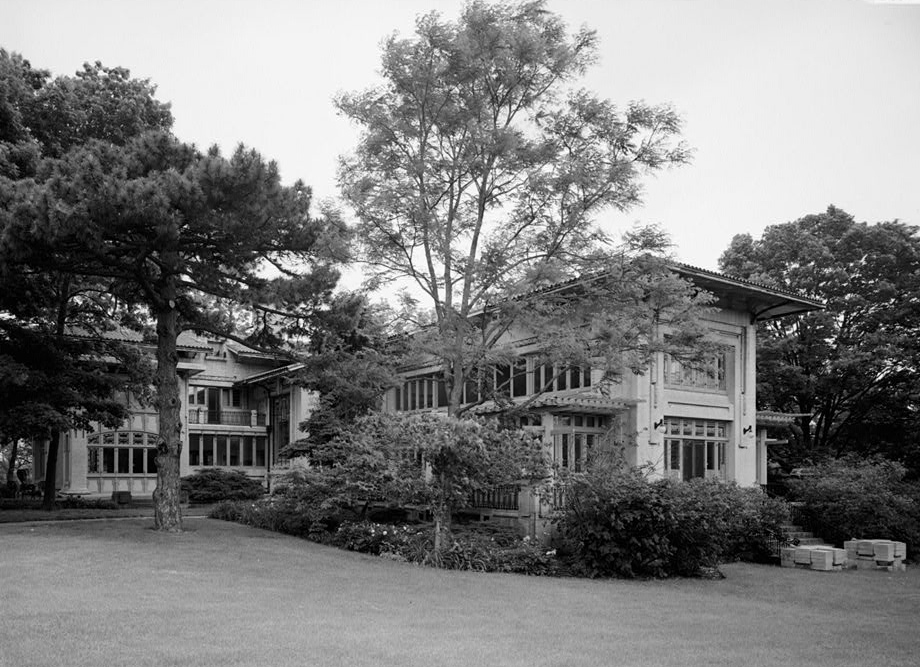
Bernard Corrigan House, Kansas City, Missouri

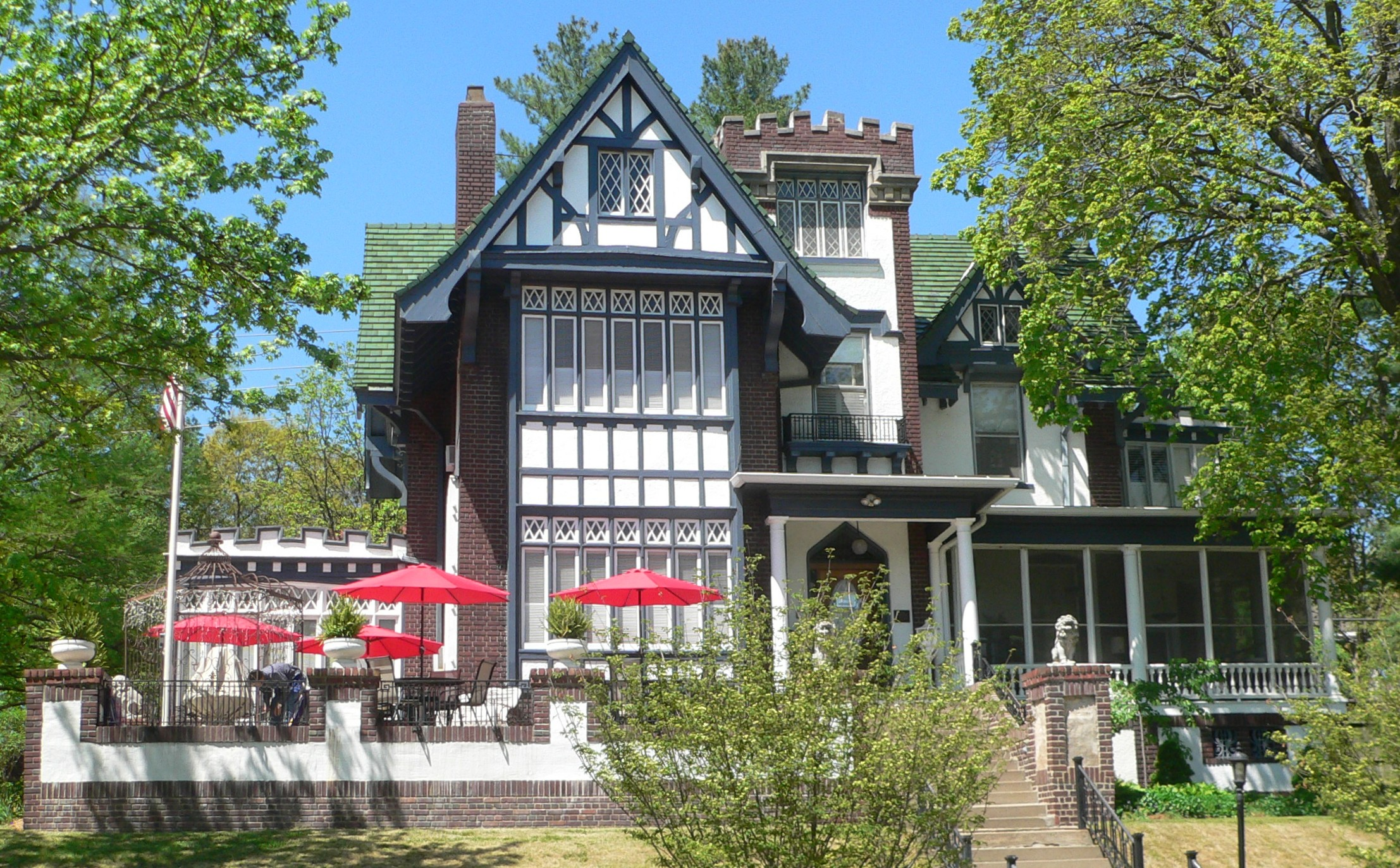
Glick-Orr House, Atchison, Kansas

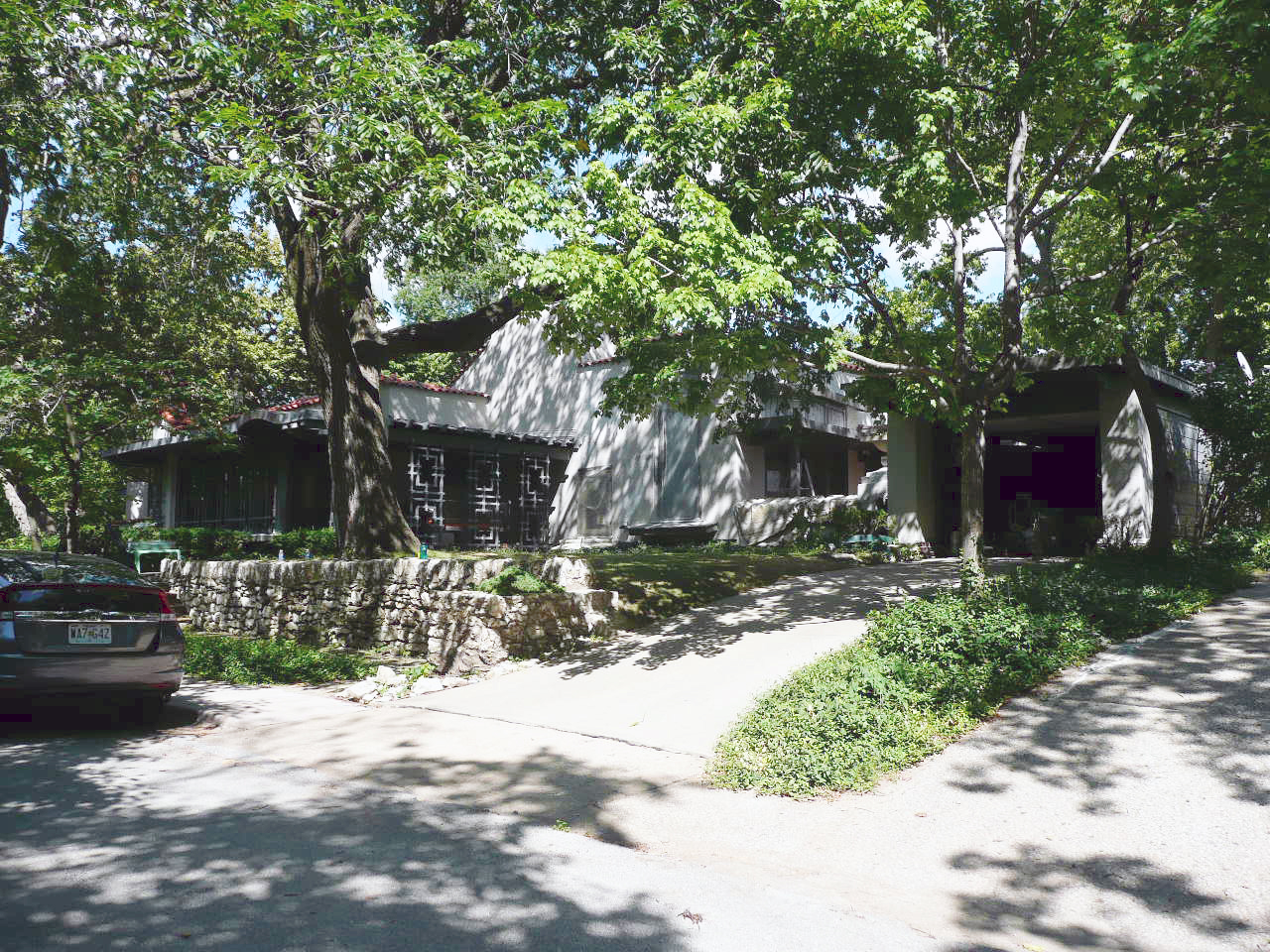
Norman Tromhauser House, Kansas City, Missouri

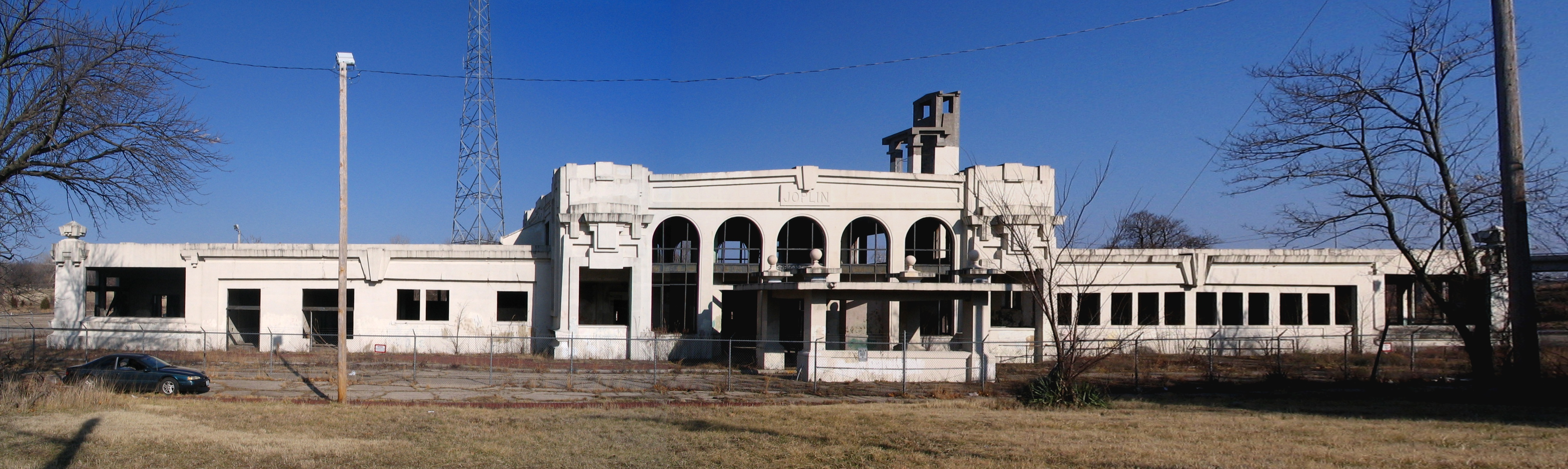
Union Depot, Joplin, Missouri

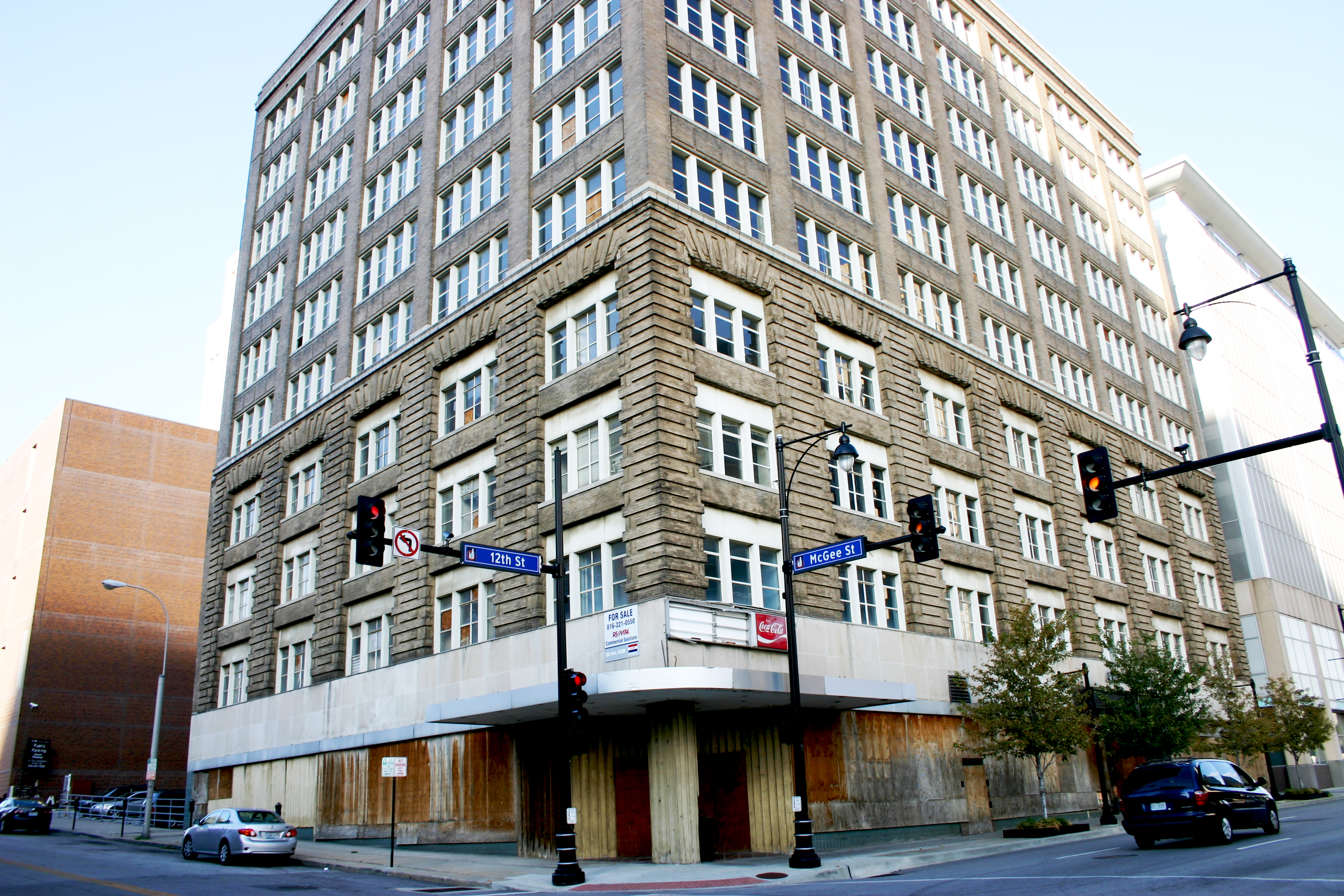
Argyle Building, Kansas City, Missouri

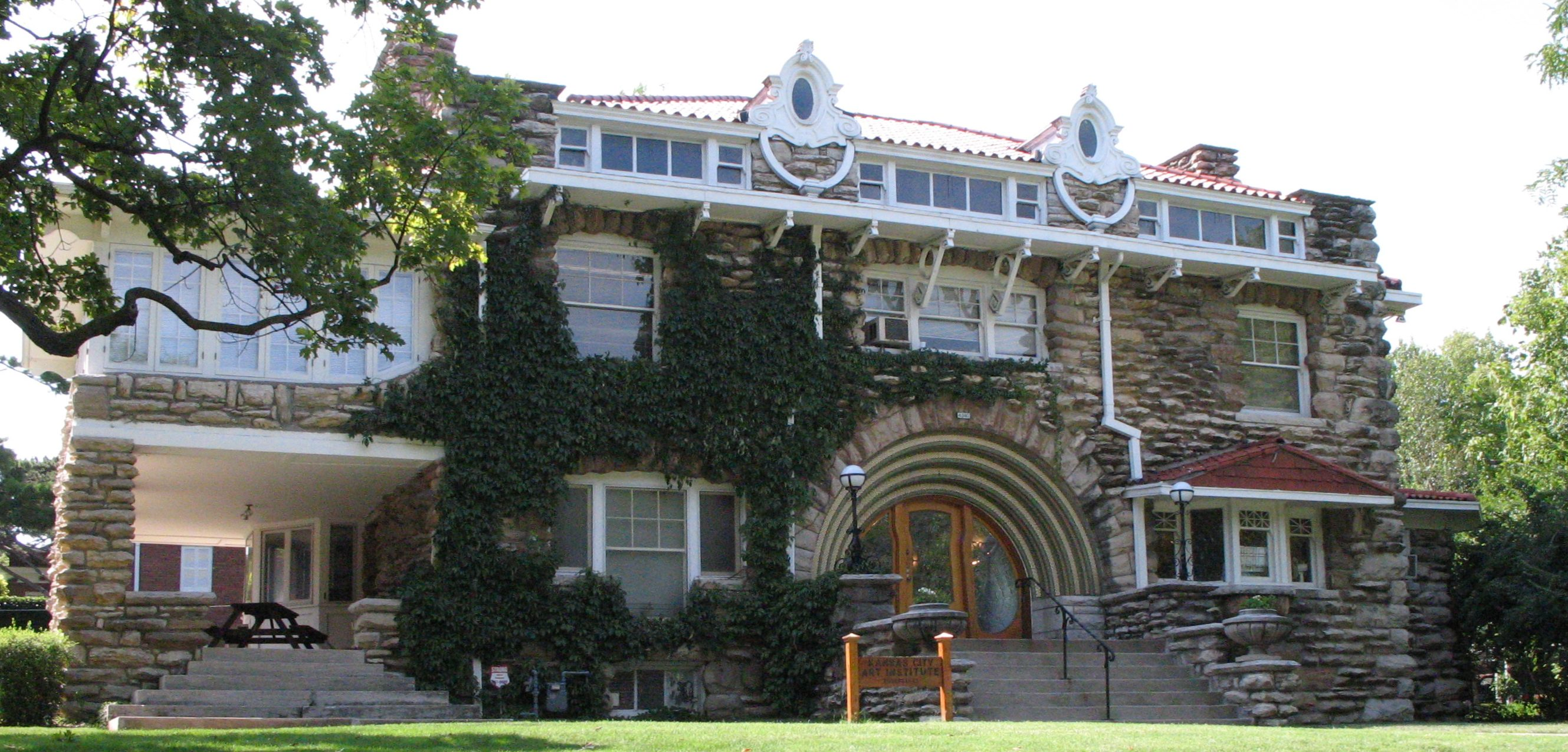
Mineral Hall, Kansas City Art Institute, Kansas City, Missouri

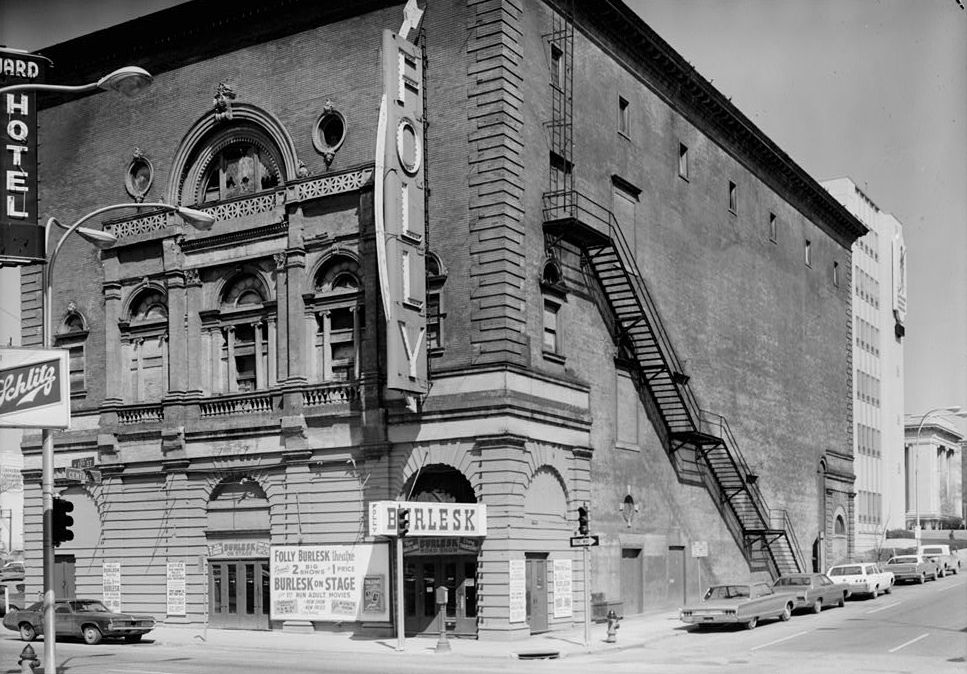
Standard Theater, Kansas City, Missouri

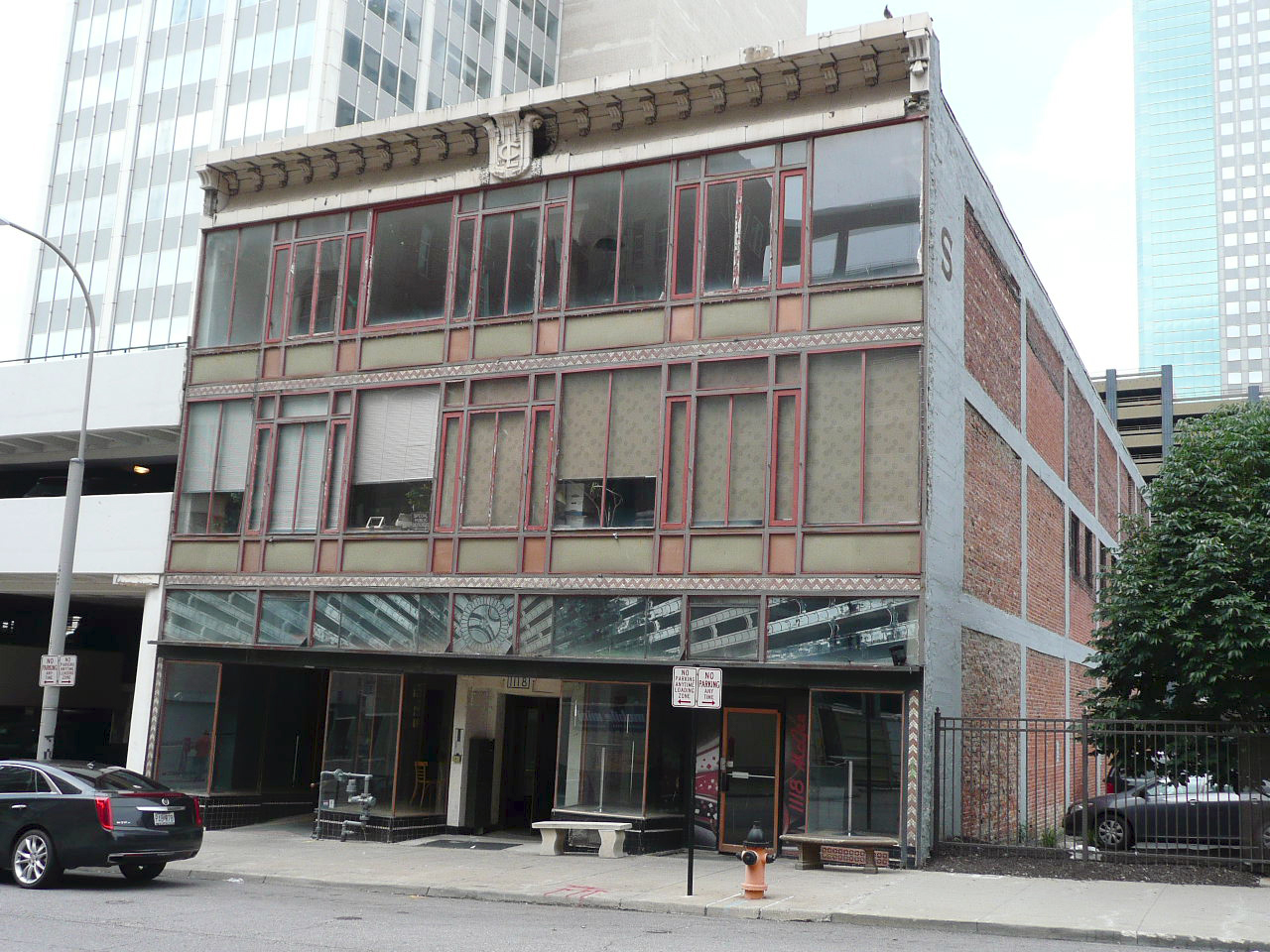
Louis Curtiss Studio Building, Kansas City, Missouri

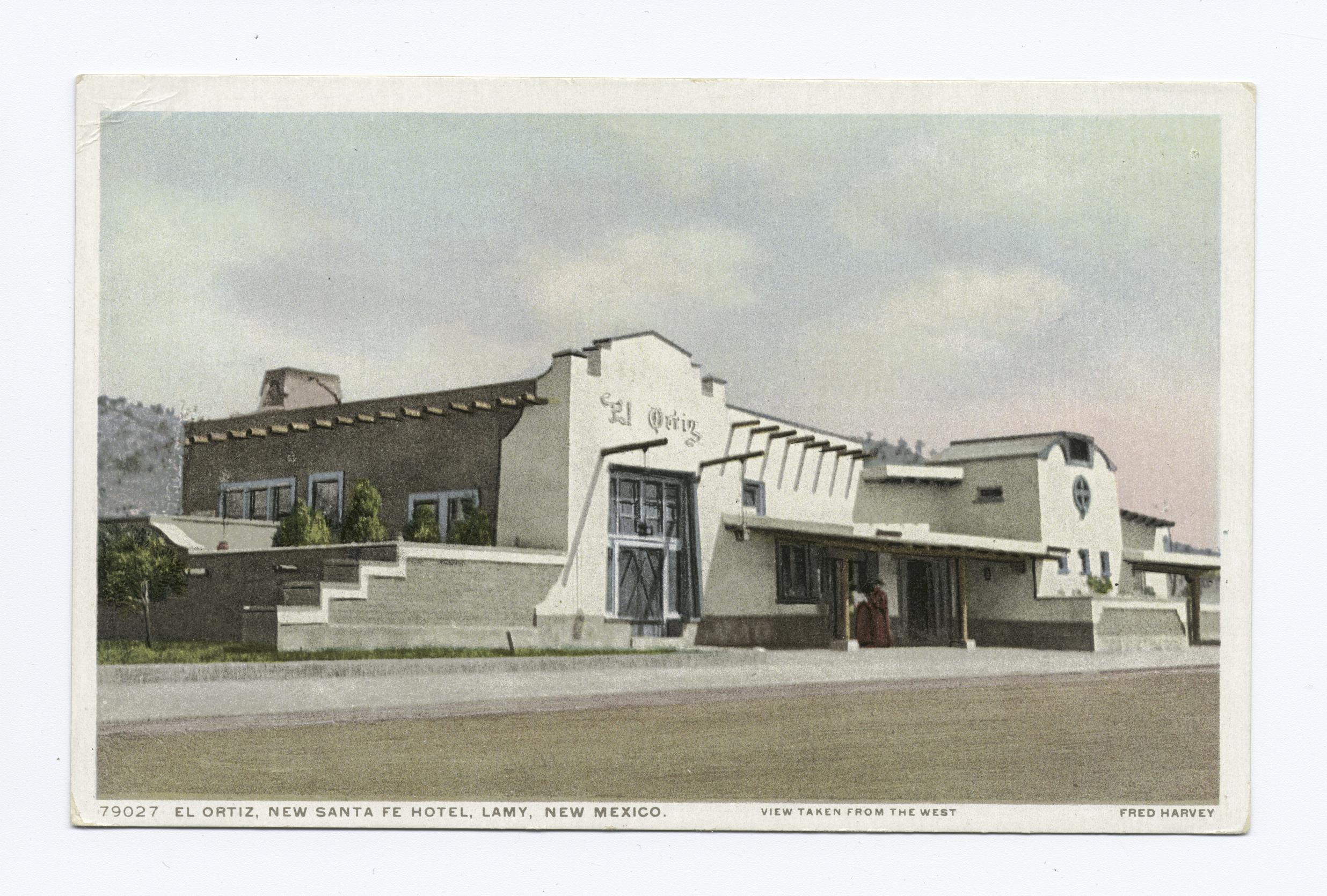
El Ortiz Hotel, Lamy, New Mexico

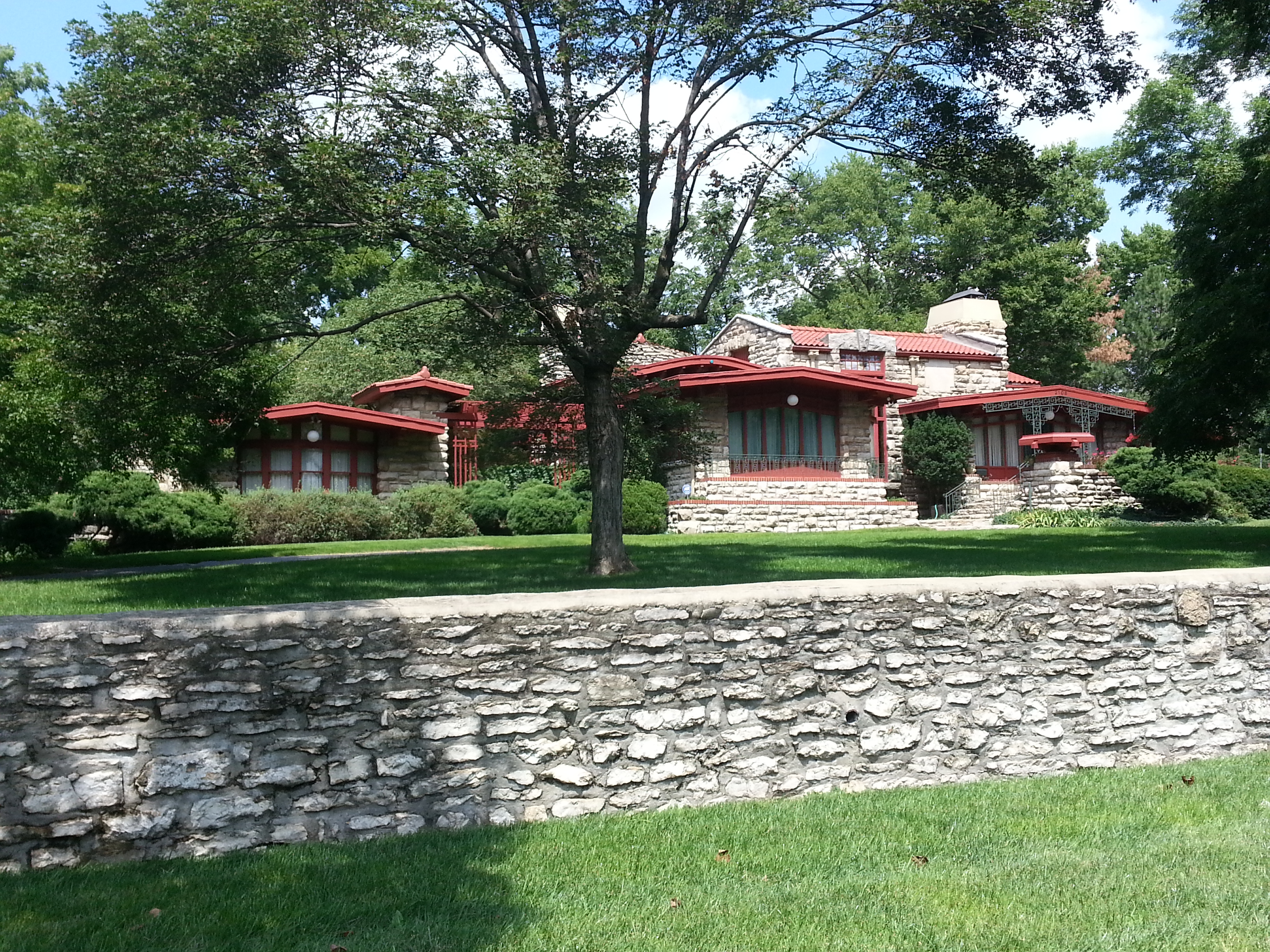
Jesse A. Hoel Residence, Kansas City, Kansas

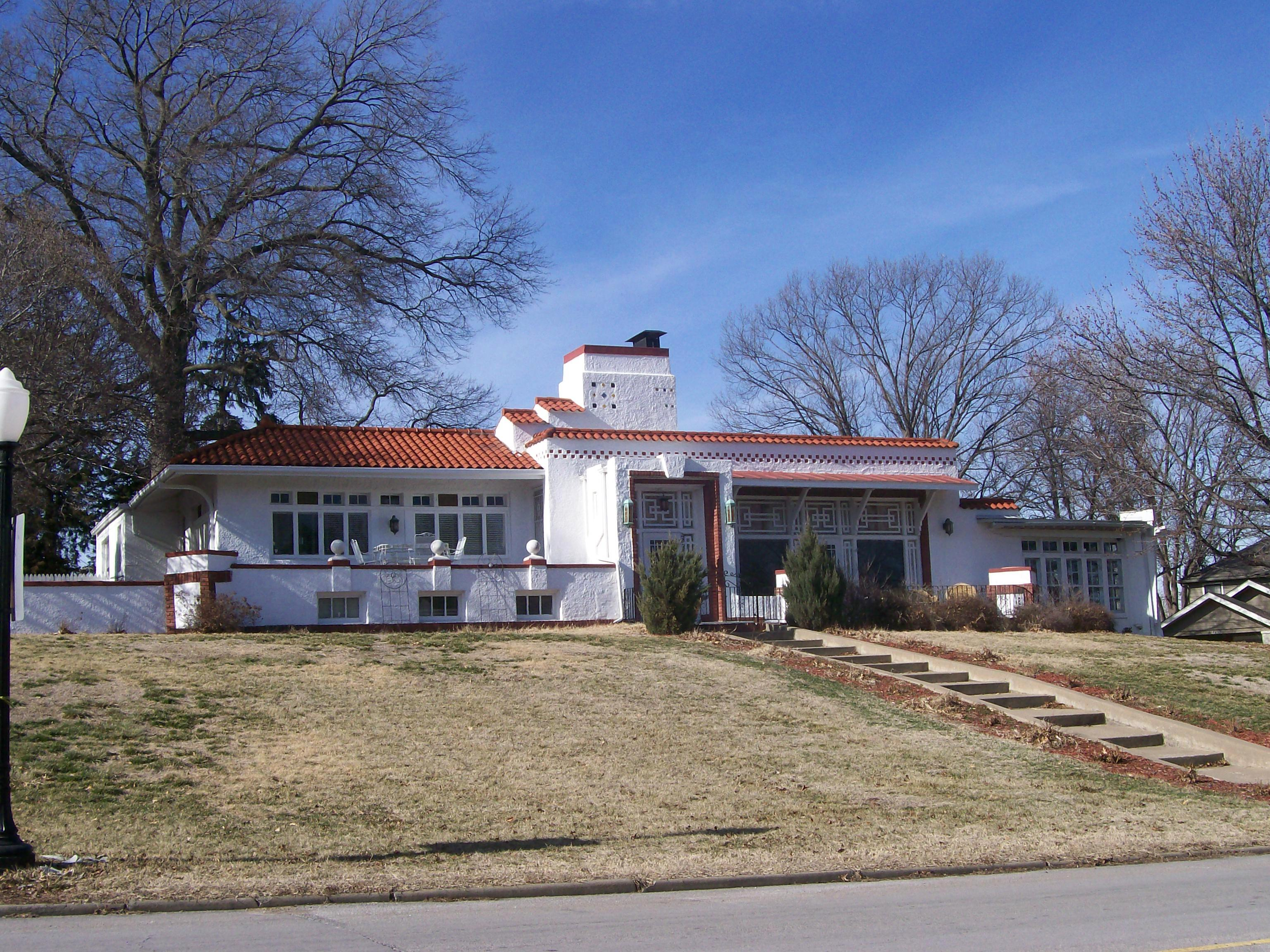
Harry G. Miller Residence, Kansas City, Kansas
