= Robert E. L. Rainey =

American painter

Robert E. L. Rainey (1914–2002) was an American artist, art educator and advertising executive. Born in Jackson, Mississippi, he grew up in Chicago, and attended the Chicago Art Institute, studying under Francis Chapin and Boris Anisfeld and receiving B.F.A. and M.F.A. degrees.

Initially a watercolorist, Rainey specialized in rural and urban scenes in the Midwest characterized by very strong color. His early work also included lithography. Later he originated a medium he called "petronexus"—bas-relief paintings of wood, stone, jesso, and color. Rainey signed his works "Reni", a play on the name of Italian Baroque painter Guido Reni.

Among Rainey's many exhibits and prizes were Northwest Print Makers 1945 (prize); Canton Art Institute 1946 (prize); Art Institute of Chicago 1938, 1940, 1942, 1944, 1946; Providence Art Club 1945; Massillon Museum 1945; Canton Art Institute 1946 (one-man show). Institutions holding his work in their permanent collections include the Seattle Art Museum, Seattle, WA, the Butler Institute of American Art, Youngstown, OH, the Canton Museum of Art, Canton, OH and the North Canton Little Art Gallery, North Canton, OH.

Rainey lived in North Canton, Ohio after 1944, where he served as director of the North Canton Little Art Gallery from 1947 to 1968. From 1950 to 1984, he owned the Ad Scribe advertising agency. His wife, Herta M. L. Kracher Rainey (1917–2006) was a printmaker, potter, and art educator. She was also a graduate of the Chicago Art Institute and had previously studied under Franz Cižek.
