= National Register of Historic Places listings in Jackson County, Missouri: Downtown Kansas City =

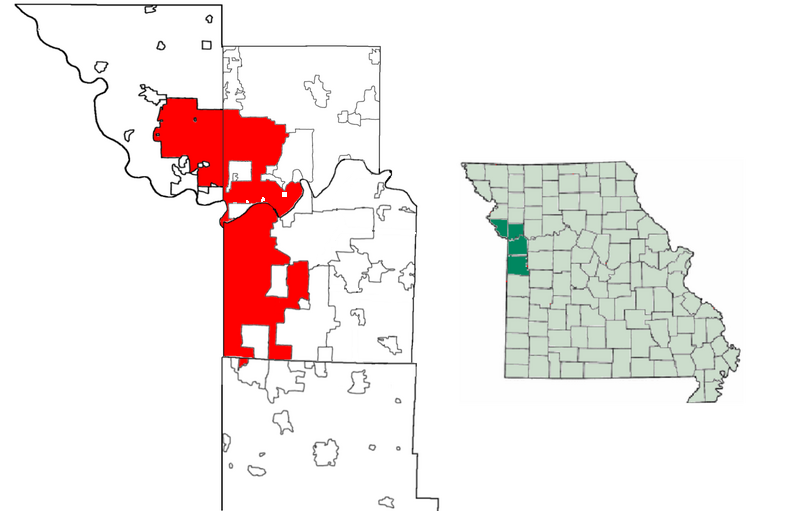
Map of Kansas City, Missouri

The National Register of Historic Places listings in downtown Kansas City, Missouri is intended to be a complete list of the properties and districts on the National Register of Historic Places in downtown Kansas City, Missouri, United States. Downtown Kansas City is defined as being roughly bounded by the Missouri River to the north, 31st Street to the south, Troost Avenue to the east, and State Line Road to the west. The locations of National Register properties and districts are in an online map.

There are 341 properties and districts listed on the National Register in Kansas City. Downtown Kansas City includes 151 of these properties and districts; the city's remaining properties and districts are the National Register of Historic Places listings in Kansas City, Missouri. One historic district overlaps the downtown and non-downtown areas of Jackson County.

This National Park Service list is complete through NPS recent listings posted October 16, 2026.

== Current listings ==
	Name on the Register	Image	Date listed	Location	Neighborhood	Description
1	1524 Grand Avenue Building	1524 Grand Avenue Building	April 15, 2004 (#04000389)	1524 Grand Boulevard; 39°05′42″N 94°34′53″W	Crossroads	
2	1901 McGee Street Automotive Service Building	1901 McGee Street Automotive Service Building	January 22, 2009 (#08001359)	1901-1907 McGee St. 39°05′25″N 94°34′48″W	Crossroads	
3	Acme Brass and Machine Works Building	Acme Brass and Machine Works Building	July 14, 2004 (#04000694)	609-611 E. 17th St. 39°05′35″N 94°34′34″W	Hospital Hill	
4	Charles Francis Adams Jr. Building		February 24, 2020 (#100004985)	1311-1315 West 13th St. 39°05′59″N 94°36′03″W		
5	Argyle Building	Argyle Building	August 17, 2005 (#05000891)	306 E. 12th St. 39°05′59″N 94°34′45″W	Downtown	
6	Auto Coach Building	Auto Coach Building	April 18, 2007 (#07000328)	1730-34 Oak St. 39°05′32″N 94°34′45″W	Crossroads	
7	Baker-Vawter Building	Baker-Vawter Building	May 5, 2000 (#00000432)	915-917 Wyandotte; 39°06′11″N 94°35′07″W	Downtown	
8	BMA Tower	BMA Tower	August 21, 2002 (#02000886)	700 West Karnes (Should be 700 West 31st Street.); 39°04′20″N 94°35′37″W	West Side	
9	Boley Building	Boley Building	March 9, 1971 (#71000467)	1130 Walnut St. 39°06′00″N 94°34′56″W	Downtown	
10	Bonfils Building	Bonfils Building	March 22, 1984 (#84002568)	1200 Grand Ave. 39°05′59″N 94°34′52″W	Downtown	
11	Bryant Building	Bryant Building	April 24, 1989 (#89000312)	1102 Grand Ave. 39°06′03″N 94°34′52″W	Downtown	
12	Buick Automobile Company Building	Buick Automobile Company Building	May 5, 2004 (#04000386)	216 Admiral Boulevard; 39°06′20″N 94°34′48″W	Downtown	
13	Bunker Building	Bunker Building	September 5, 1975 (#75001067)	820 Baltimore Ave. 39°06′14″N 94°35′04″W	Downtown	
14	Centennial Building		October 19, 2026 (#100013536)	210 West 10th Street; 39°06′09″N 94°35′11″W		
15	Chambers Building	Chambers Building	December 28, 2001 (#01001379)	25 E. 12th St. 39°05′59″N 94°34′57″W	Downtown	
16	Cherry Street Colonnades Historic District	Cherry Street Colonnades Historic District	September 22, 2005 (#05001050)	2523, 2527, 2531, 2535, 2539, 2543, 2547, 2542, and 2544 Cherry St. 39°04′48″N 94°34′38″W	Longfellow/Dutch Hill	
17	Christian Church Hospital	Christian Church Hospital	October 21, 2004 (#04001161)	2697 West Paseo Boulevard (NRHP application incorrectly gives 2524 W. Paseo Boulevard.); 39°04′42″N 94°33′59″W	Beacon Hill-McFeders	
18	City Bank Building	City Bank Building	February 17, 1983 (#83000996)	1801 Grand Ave. 39°05′30″N 94°34′51″W	Crossroads	
19	Coates House Hotel	Coates House Hotel	February 23, 1972 (#72000715)	1005 Broadway; 39°06′08″N 94°35′17″W	Downtown	
20	Coca-Cola Building	Coca-Cola Building	August 18, 1988 (#88001300)	2101-2111 Grand Ave. 39°05′15″N 94°34′53″W	Crown Center	Also known as the Western Auto Building
21	Columbia Building	Columbia Building	May 5, 2000 (#00000433)	2006-2012 Wyandotte St. 39°05′20″N 94°35′11″W	Crossroads	
22	Commerce Tower	Commerce Tower	April 11, 2014 (#14000141)	911 Main St. 39°06′12″N 94°34′58″W	Downtown	
23	Commerce Trust Company Historic District	Commerce Trust Company Historic District	November 9, 2015 (#15000772)	Bounded by E. 9th, Walnut, E. 10th & Main Sts. 39°06′10″N 94°34′57″W	Downtown	
24	Continental Hotel	Continental Hotel	August 8, 1983 (#83000997)	106 W. 11th St. 39°06′04″N 94°35′04″W	Downtown	Also known as Mark Twain Tower
25	Thos. Corrigan Building	Thos. Corrigan Building	September 16, 1982 (#82003143)	1828 Walnut St. 39°05′26″N 94°34′58″W	Crossroads	
26	The Crane Company Building	The Crane Company Building	May 18, 2018 (#100002424)	1105-1107 Hickory St. 39°06′05″N 94°36′05″W	West Bottoms	
27	Creamery Package Manufacturing Company Building	Creamery Package Manufacturing Company Building	November 7, 2016 (#16000764)	1408-1410 W. 12th St. 39°06′03″N 94°36′06″W	West Bottoms	
28	Crossroads Historic Freight District		December 22, 2000 (#00001565)	Roughly bounded by Southwest Boulevard, W. 20th St., Baltimore Ave., W. 22nd St., and Broadway; 39°05′18″N 94°35′13″W	Crossroads	
29	Crown Center Historic District		November 14, 2019 (#100004601)	Bounded by Main St., Pershing Rd., 27th St., McGee St., Trfy, Grand Blvd. 39°05′21″N 94°34′57″W		
30	Louis Curtiss Studio Building	Louis Curtiss Studio Building	June 19, 1972 (#72000716)	1116-1120 McGee St. 39°06′01″N 94°34′48″W	Downtown	
31	Dierks Building	Dierks Building	January 29, 2009 (#08001387)	1000-1006 Grand Boulevard; 39°06′08″N 94°34′51″W	Downtown	
32	District I		August 8, 1983 (#83001000)	Roughly bounded by Baltimore Ave. and W. 12th, W. 13th, and Wyandotte Sts. 39°05′59″N 94°35′04″W	Downtown	
33	East Ninth Street-Grand Boulevard Historic District		October 9, 2020 (#100005660)	Roughly bounded by Main, McGee, East 8th and East 10th Sts. 39°06′13″N 94°34′53″W		
34	Executive Plaza Office Building	Executive Plaza Office Building	March 13, 2017 (#100000750)	720 Main St. 39°06′17″N 94°35′00″W	Downtown	
35	The Fairfax Building	The Fairfax Building	July 22, 2015 (#15000471)	101 W. 11th St. 39°06′03″N 94°35′04″W	Downtown	
36	Faultless Starch Company Building	Faultless Starch Company Building	May 9, 2002 (#02000470)	1025 W. 8th St. 39°06′19″N 94°35′45″W	West Bottoms	
37	Federal Office Building	Federal Office Building	August 2, 2021 (#100006773)	601 East 12th St. 39°05′56″N 94°34′34″W		AKA the Richard Bolling Federal Building
38	Federal Reserve Bank of Kansas City	Federal Reserve Bank of Kansas City	April 10, 2007 (#07000327)	925 Grand Boulevard; 39°06′14″N 94°34′49″W	Downtown	
39	The Fidelity National Bank and Trust Company Building	The Fidelity National Bank and Trust Company Building	August 14, 1997 (#97000908)	911 Walnut St. 39°06′11″N 94°34′54″W	Downtown	
40	Fire Department Headquarters; Fire station No. 2	Fire Department Headquarters; Fire station No. 2	September 2, 1982 (#82003144)	1020 Central Ave. 39°06′05″N 94°35′14″W	Downtown	
41	Firestone Building	Firestone Building	January 3, 1986 (#86000004)	2001 Grand Ave. 39°05′20″N 94°34′51″W	Crown Center	
42	Gate City National Bank	Gate City National Bank	September 2, 1982 (#82003145)	1111 Grand Ave. 39°06′02″N 94°34′50″W	Downtown	
43	Globe Storage and Transfer Company Building	Globe Storage and Transfer Company Building	April 18, 2007 (#07000326)	1712 Main St. 39°05′35″N 94°35′01″W	Crossroads	
44	Grand Avenue Temple and Grand Avenue Temple Building	Grand Avenue Temple and Grand Avenue Temple Building	May 8, 1985 (#85001006)	205 E. 9th St. and 903 Grand Ave. 39°06′12″N 94°34′50″W	Downtown	
45	Graphic Arts Building	Graphic Arts Building	August 4, 2005 (#05000810)	934 Wyandotte St. 39°06′09″N 94°35′08″W	Downtown	
46	Greenlease Cadillac Building	Greenlease Cadillac Building	June 13, 2003 (#03000523)	2900 Gillham Rd. 39°04′25″N 94°34′44″W	Union Hill	
47	Guadalupe Center	Guadalupe Center	September 2, 2003 (#03000866)	1015 Avenida de Cesar Chavez; 39°05′09″N 94°35′49″W	West Side	
48	Gumbel Building	Gumbel Building	January 22, 1979 (#79001367)	801 Walnut St. 39°06′15″N 94°34′54″W	Downtown	
49	Helping Hand Institute Building	Helping Hand Institute Building	May 5, 2000 (#00000434)	523 Grand Boulevard; 39°06′29″N 94°34′48″W	River Market	
50	Hesse Carriage Company Building	Hesse Carriage Company Building	March 21, 2007 (#07000169)	1700 Oak St. 39°05′35″N 94°34′45″W	Crossroads	
51	Holy Rosary Historic District	Holy Rosary Historic District	February 7, 2007 (#07000007)	Roughly bounded by 5th and Campbell, 5th and Harrison, and 9th and E. Missouri Ave. (More precisely, 5th to Missouri, and Campbell to Harrison.); 39°06′34″N 94°34′21″W	Columbus Park	
52	Hoover Brothers Building	Hoover Brothers Building	November 14, 2019 (#100004600)	922 Oak St. 39°06′09″N 94°34′42″W		
53	Hotel Phillips	Hotel Phillips	June 4, 1979 (#79001369)	106 W. 12th St. 39°06′00″N 94°35′05″W	Downtown	
54	Frank M. Howe Residence	Frank M. Howe Residence	April 18, 1985 (#85000854)	1707 Jefferson St. 39°05′33″N 94°35′31″W	West Side	
55	Insurance Building-Consumers Cooperative Association Building	Insurance Building-Consumers Cooperative Association Building	November 25, 2005 (#05001327)	318-320 E. 10th St. 39°06′09″N 94°34′45″W	Downtown	
56	Inter-State Building	Inter-State Building	June 12, 2008 (#08000534)	417 E. 13th St./1300 Locust St. 39°05′54″N 94°34′40″W	Downtown	
57	Interstate Securities Building	Interstate Securities Building	October 23, 2017 (#100001759)	215 E. 18th St. 39°05′30″N 94°34′50″W		
58	Jenkins Music Company Building	Jenkins Music Company Building	March 2, 1979 (#79001370)	1217-1223 Walnut St. 39°05′57″N 94°34′55″W	Downtown	
59	Jensen-Salsbery Laboratories	Jensen-Salsbery Laboratories	July 16, 1985 (#85001574)	520 W. Pennway St. 39°05′16″N 94°35′27″W	West Side	
60	Kansas City Club Building	Kansas City Club Building	November 19, 2002 (#02001401)	1228 Baltimore Ave. 39°05′56″N 94°35′05″W	Downtown	
61	Kansas City Cold Storage Company Building	Kansas City Cold Storage Company Building	June 1, 2005 (#05000510)	500 E. 3rd St. 39°06′40″N 94°34′43″W	River Market	
62	Kansas City Live Stock Exchange	Kansas City Live Stock Exchange	April 5, 1984 (#84002571)	1600 Genessee St. 39°05′40″N 94°36′19″W	West Side	
63	Kansas City Parks and Boulevards Historic District		August 9, 2016 (#14000931)	Roughly bounded by Missouri R., Hardesty Ave., Armour Blvd. & State Line. 39°04′57″N 94°33′18″W		
64	Kansas City Police Station Number 4	Kansas City Police Station Number 4	October 26, 2005 (#05001184)	103 W. 19th St. 39°05′27″N 94°35′07″W	Crossroads	
65	Kansas City Power and Light Company Building	Kansas City Power and Light Company Building	January 9, 2002 (#88001852)	1330 Baltimore Ave. 39°05′51″N 94°35′05″W	Downtown	
66	Kansas City Power and Light Company Substation "A"	Kansas City Power and Light Company Substation "A"	January 29, 2018 (#100002032)	2645 Madison Ave. 39°04′43″N 94°35′43″W		
67	Kansas City Public Library	Kansas City Public Library	May 23, 1977 (#77000807)	500 E. 9th St. 39°06′13″N 94°34′37″W	Downtown	
68	Kansas City Southern Railway Building	Kansas City Southern Railway Building	May 6, 2004 (#04000392)	114 W. 11th St. 39°06′04″N 94°35′07″W	Downtown	
69	Kansas City Star Building	Kansas City Star Building	June 24, 2019 (#100004102)	1729 Grand Blvd. 39°05′34″N 94°34′53″W		
70	Kansas City Terminal Railway Company Roundhouse Historic District	Kansas City Terminal Railway Company Roundhouse Historic District	January 26, 2001 (#00001682)	Junction of 27th St. and Southwest Boulevard; 39°04′46″N 94°36′04″W	West Side	
71	Kansas City Title and Trust Building	Kansas City Title and Trust Building	June 25, 2005 (#05000624)	927 Walnut St. 39°06′09″N 94°34′54″W	Downtown	
72	Kansas City Water Department Building	Kansas City Water Department Building	April 7, 1994 (#94000290)	201 Main St. 39°06′38″N 94°35′00″W	River Market	
73	Kansas City, Missouri Western Union Telegraph Building	Kansas City, Missouri Western Union Telegraph Building	February 12, 2003 (#03000010)	100-114 E. 7th St. 39°06′20″N 94°34′53″W	Downtown	
74	Kelley-Reppert Motor Company Building	Kelley-Reppert Motor Company Building	November 12, 2004 (#04001223)	422 Admiral Boulevard; 39°06′20″N 94°34′40″W	Downtown	
75	Kellogg-Mackay Company Buildings	Kellogg-Mackay Company Buildings	June 27, 2022 (#100007816)	2020-2030 Walnut St. 39°05′17″N 94°34′58″W		
76	Kemper Arena	Kemper Arena	September 9, 2016 (#14000160)	1800 Genessee Street; 39°05′31″N 94°36′21″W	Downtown	Revolutionary 1974 Helmut Jahn design has hosted political conventions as well as NBA and NHL games
77	Kirkwood Building	Kirkwood Building	July 25, 2001 (#01000767)	1737-41 McGee St. 39°05′30″N 94°34′43″W	Crossroads	
78	Land Bank Building	Land Bank Building	January 18, 1985 (#85000101)	15 W. 10th St. 39°06′08″N 94°35′01″W	Downtown	
79	Liberty Memorial	Liberty Memorial	October 6, 2000 (#00001148)	100 W. 26th St. 39°04′52″N 94°35′09″W	Crown Center	
80	Liquid Carbonic Company Building	Liquid Carbonic Company Building	April 29, 1994 (#94000365)	2000 Baltimore St. 39°05′20″N 94°35′06″W	Crossroads	
81	Loew's Midland Theater–Midland Building	Loew's Midland Theater–Midland Building	September 28, 1977 (#77000808)	1232-1234 Main St. and 1221-1233 Baltimore Ave. 39°05′56″N 94°35′01″W	Downtown	
82	R.A. Long Building	R.A. Long Building	January 8, 2003 (#02001683)	928 Grand Boulevard; 39°06′09″N 94°34′52″W	Downtown	
83	Lowe and Campbell Sporting Goods Building	Lowe and Campbell Sporting Goods Building	January 12, 2012 (#11001018)	1509-13 Baltimore Ave. 39°05′44″N 94°35′04″W	Crossroads	
84	Mainstreet Theatre	Mainstreet Theatre	February 15, 2007 (#07000043)	1400 Main St. 39°05′49″N 94°35′01″W	Downtown	
85	Marks and Garvey Historic District	Marks and Garvey Historic District	June 26, 2006 (#06000542)	2429, 2433, and 2437 Tracy Ave. 39°04′57″N 94°34′04″W	Beacon Hill-McFeders	
86	Albert Marty Building	Albert Marty Building	February 5, 2013 (#12001257)	1412-1418 W. 12th St. 39°06′03″N 94°36′08″W	West Bottoms	
87	Mason Building	Mason Building	September 13, 2021 (#100006891)	1110 Grand Blvd. 39°06′02″N 94°34′52″W		
88	McGee Street Automotive Historic District		May 20, 2018 (#100002427)	Bounded by E 17th, & E 20th Sts., McGee St. at the 1700 & 1900 blocks, Alleys between McGee and Grand at 1800 blk. & McGee & Oak Sts. 39°05′30″N 94°34′51″W		
89	Mercantile Bank & Trust Building	Mercantile Bank & Trust Building	December 31, 2009 (#09000830)	1101 Walnut St. 39°06′03″N 94°34′55″W	Downtown	
90	Midwest Hotel	Midwest Hotel	May 6, 2004 (#04000394)	1925 Main St. 39°05′22″N 94°35′01″W	Crossroads	
91	Moline Plow Company Building	Moline Plow Company Building	June 17, 2019 (#100004065)	1015 Mulberry St. 39°06′06″N 94°35′59″W	West Bottoms	
92	Monroe Hotel	Monroe Hotel	May 6, 2004 (#04000395)	1904-06 Main St. 39°05′24″N 94°35′02″W	Crossroads	
93	Montgomery Ward and Company General Merchandise Warehouse	Montgomery Ward and Company General Merchandise Warehouse	July 8, 2010 (#10000461)	819 E. 19th St. 39°05′24″N 94°34′24″W	Hospital Hill	
94	C.A. Murdock Manufacturing Company Building	C.A. Murdock Manufacturing Company Building	May 10, 2016 (#16000234)	1225-1227 Union Avenue; 39°06′09″N 94°35′57″W		
95	National Bank of Commerce Building	National Bank of Commerce Building	May 5, 1999 (#99000530)	922-924 Walnut St. 39°06′09″N 94°34′55″W	Downtown	
96	New York Life Building	New York Life Building	July 8, 1970 (#70000336)	20 W. 9th St. 39°06′13″N 94°35′03″W	Downtown	
97	Old New England Building	Old New England Building	October 25, 1973 (#73001040)	112 W. 9th St. 39°06′14″N 94°35′07″W	Downtown	
98	Old Town Historic District	Old Town Historic District	June 7, 1978 (#78001656)	Roughly bounded by Independence Ave., 2nd, Delaware and Walnut Sts.; also 119, 207, and 213 Walnut St.; also 136 Main St.; also 140 Walnut St.; also roughly bounded by E. 2nd, Locust, and Walnut Sts., and E. Missouri Ave. 39°06′32″N 94°34′59″W	River Market	Second through fifth sets of boundaries represent boundary increases of July 1, 2005, October 5, 2005, February 14, 2006, and January 17, 2012
99	Palace Clothing Company Building	Palace Clothing Company Building	January 18, 1985 (#85000102)	1126-1128 Grand Ave. 39°06′00″N 94°34′52″W	Downtown	
100	George B. Peck Dry Goods Company Building	George B. Peck Dry Goods Company Building	April 30, 1980 (#80002368)	1044 Main St. 39°06′04″N 94°35′01″W	Downtown	
101	Thomas J. Pendergast Headquarters	Thomas J. Pendergast Headquarters	October 25, 2011 (#11000764)	1908 Main St. 39°05′24″N 94°35′02″W	Crossroads	
102	Pennbroke Apartments	Pennbroke Apartments	April 15, 2009 (#09000206)	604 W. 10th St. 39°06′09″N 94°35′29″W	Quality Hill	
103	Joseph Grear Peppard House	Joseph Grear Peppard House	March 26, 1985 (#85000649)	1704 Jefferson St. 39°05′34″N 94°35′33″W	West Side	
104	Perfection Stove Company Building	Perfection Stove Company Building	July 14, 2014 (#14000376)	1200 Union Ave. 39°06′09″N 94°35′54″W	West Bottoms	
105	Nelle E. Peters Troost Avenue Historic District	Nelle E. Peters Troost Avenue Historic District	July 23, 2009 (#09000552)	2719-37 and 2730 Troost Ave. 39°04′36″N 94°34′15″W	Beacon Hill-McFeders	
106	Pickwick Hotel, Office Building, Parking Garage and Bus Terminal	Pickwick Hotel, Office Building, Parking Garage and Bus Terminal	March 29, 2005 (#05000220)	901-937 McGee St., 301-311 E. 9th St., 300-310 E. Tenth St., and 906-912 Oak St. 39°06′10″N 94°34′46″W	Downtown	
107	President Hotel	President Hotel	August 8, 1983 (#83001016)	1327-1335 Baltimore Ave. 39°05′52″N 94°35′03″W	Downtown	
108	Professional Building	Professional Building	July 17, 1979 (#79001373)	1101-1107 Grand Ave. 39°06′03″N 94°34′49″W	Downtown	
109	Quality Hill	Quality Hill	July 7, 1978 (#78001657)	Roughly bounded by Broadway, 10th, 14th, and Jefferson Sts. 39°06′00″N 94°35′26″W	Quality Hill	
110	Quality Hill Center Historic District		April 3, 2017 (#100000824)	817, 905, 929 Jefferson St. & 910 Pennsylvania Ave. 39°06′12″N 94°35′30″W	Quality Hill	
111	Richards and Conover Hardware Company Building	Richards and Conover Hardware Company Building	January 21, 1999 (#98001636)	200 W. 5th St. 39°06′28″N 94°35′08″W	River Market	
112	Ridenour–Baker Grocery Company Building	Ridenour–Baker Grocery Company Building	April 21, 2014 (#14000161)	933 Mulberry St. 39°06′11″N 94°35′58″W	West Bottoms	Demolition started March 2024.
113	Rieger Hotel	Rieger Hotel	May 6, 2004 (#04000396)	1922 Main St. 39°05′22″N 94°35′02″W	Crossroads	
114	Sacred Heart Church, School and Rectory	Sacred Heart Church, School and Rectory	November 14, 1978 (#78001659)	2540-2544 Madison Ave. and 910 W. 26th St. 39°04′50″N 94°35′44″W	West Side	
115	Safeway Stores and Office and Warehouse Building	Safeway Stores and Office and Warehouse Building	May 5, 2000 (#00000435)	2029-2043 Wyandotte St. 39°05′17″N 94°35′10″W	Crossroads	
116	St. Mary's Episcopal Church	St. Mary's Episcopal Church	November 7, 1978 (#78001663)	1307 Holmes St. 39°05′53″N 94°34′28″W	Downtown	
117	Savoy Hotel and Grill	Savoy Hotel and Grill	December 30, 1974 (#74001073)	219 W. 9th St. and 9th and Central Sts. 39°06′13″N 94°35′12″W	Downtown	
118	Scarritt Building and Arcade	Scarritt Building and Arcade	March 9, 1971 (#71000468)	Corner of 9th and Grand Sts. and 819 Walnut St. 39°06′13″N 94°34′52″W	Downtown	
119	Sewall Paint and Glass Company Building	Sewall Paint and Glass Company Building	May 9, 2002 (#02000469)	1009-1013 W. 8th St. 39°06′20″N 94°35′43″W	West Bottoms	
120	Southwestern Bell Administration Building	Southwestern Bell Administration Building	October 19, 2020 (#100005679)	500 East 8th St. 39°06′15″N 94°34′36″W		
121	E. R. Squibb and Sons Building	E. R. Squibb and Sons Building	December 7, 2010 (#10000985)	2500 W. Pennyway St. 39°04′55″N 94°35′32″W	West Side	
122	Standard Theatre	Standard Theatre	June 5, 1974 (#74001074)	300 W. 12th St. 39°06′01″N 94°35′14″W	Downtown	
123	R.O. Stenzel & Company, Warehouse	R.O. Stenzel & Company, Warehouse	July 18, 2007 (#07000702)	1811 Walnut; 39°05′29″N 94°34′56″W	Crossroads	
124	Stine and McClure Undertaking Company Building	Stine and McClure Undertaking Company Building	July 19, 1990 (#90001105)	924-926 Oak St. 39°06′09″N 94°34′43″W	Downtown	
125	Studna Garage Building	Studna Garage Building	July 5, 2006 (#06000539)	415 Oak St. 39°06′34″N 94°34′45″W	River Market	
126	Sweeney Automobile and Tractor School	Sweeney Automobile and Tractor School	April 11, 2014 (#14000142)	215 W. Pershing Rd. 39°05′00″N 94°35′13″W	Crown Center	
127	Switzer School Buildings	Switzer School Buildings	December 18, 2009 (#09001098)	Generally bounded by Madison Ave. and Summit St., and 18th to 20th Sts. 39°05′25″N 94°35′38″W	West Side	
128	Ten Main Center	Ten Main Center	November 2, 2015 (#15000760)	920 Main St. 39°06′09″N 94°35′00″W		
129	Townley Metal & Hardware Company Building	Townley Metal & Hardware Company Building	April 14, 1994 (#94000286)	200-210 Walnut St. 39°06′39″N 94°34′57″W	River Market	
130	Traders National Bank Building	Traders National Bank Building	May 10, 2016 (#16000233)	1125 Grand Blvd. 39°06′00″N 94°34′51″W		
131	Triangle Battery and Service Company Building		October 17, 2003 (#03001058)	3001-03 Gillham Rd. 39°04′21″N 94°34′43″W	Longfellow/Dutch Hill	Demolished.
132	TWA Corporate Headquarters' Building	TWA Corporate Headquarters' Building	November 20, 2002 (#02001403)	1735-1741 Baltimore Ave.-1740 Main St. 39°05′31″N 94°35′04″W	Crossroads	
133	Twenty-Twenty Grand Building	Twenty-Twenty Grand Building	April 16, 2012 (#12000205)	2008-2020 Grand Boulevard; 39°05′19″N 94°34′55″W	Crossroads	
134	Twenty-Ninth Street Colonnaded Apartments Historic District	Twenty-Ninth Street Colonnaded Apartments Historic District	February 7, 2007 (#07000018)	900-906 E. 29th St. and 2843 N. Campbell, 910-912 E. 29th St., and 914 E. 29th St. 39°04′27″N 94°34′25″W	Longfellow/Dutch Hill	
135	U.S. Courthouse and Post Office-Kansas City, MO	U.S. Courthouse and Post Office-Kansas City, MO	November 20, 2007 (#07001231)	811 Grand Boulevard; 39°06′14″N 94°34′49″W	Downtown	
136	Union Cemetery	Union Cemetery	April 19, 2016 (#16000183)	227 East 28th Terrace; 39°04′33″N 94°34′53″W		
137	Union Station	Union Station	February 1, 1972 (#72000719)	Pershing Rd. and Main St.; also generally bounded by the Kansas City Terminal railroad tracks at Pennway, Pershing Rd., and Union Station; 39°05′05″N 94°35′08″W	Crown Center	Railroad tracks represent a boundary increase of May 6, 2004
138	United States Post Office-Kansas City	United States Post Office-Kansas City	May 26, 2004 (#04000213)	315 W. Pershing Rd. 39°04′58″N 94°35′17″W	Crown Center	
139	Joe Vaccaro Soda Water Manufacturing Company Building	Joe Vaccaro Soda Water Manufacturing Company Building	October 18, 2003 (#03001055)	918-922 E. 5th St. 39°06′38″N 94°34′21″W	Columbus Park	
140	Vitagraph Film Exchange Building	Vitagraph Film Exchange Building	February 28, 2008 (#08000091)	1703 Wyandotte St. 39°05′36″N 94°35′04″W	Crossroads	
141	Walnut Street Warehouse and Commercial Historic District		September 17, 1999 (#99001158)	Roughly bounded by Main St., 15th St., Grand St. and 17th St.; also 1612, 1616, 1620, and 1624 Grand Boulevard and 1705-07 and 1709 Walnut St.; also 1526, 1524, 1520, 1516-18, 1512-14, and 1508 Grand Boulevard; 39°05′43″N 94°34′56″W	Crossroads	Second and third sets of boundaries represent boundary increases of June 13, 2008 and December 17, 2008
142	Waltower Building	Waltower Building	August 8, 2001 (#01000837)	823 Walnut St. 39°06′13″N 94°34′54″W	Downtown	
143	Maj. William Warner House	Maj. William Warner House	May 23, 1977 (#77000811)	1021 Pennsylvania Ave. 39°06′06″N 94°35′27″W	Quality Hill	
144	Webster School	Webster School	September 2, 1982 (#82003147)	1644 Wyandotte St. 39°05′35″N 94°35′10″W	Crossroads	
145	West Bottoms Historic District		November 15, 2016 (#16000771)	W. 9th St., St. Louis Ave., Union Ave from Wyoming to W. of Mulberry Sts.; also bounded by St. Louis Ave., Santa Fe St., West 14th St., Liberty St., North and East Rail lines 39°06′10″N 94°35′56″W	Downtown	Expanded and renamed from West Bottoms–North Historic District on September 26, 2022.
146	West 8th Street Historic District		October 21, 2026 (#100013567)	931-1127 West 8th Street 811-817 Santa Fe Street; 39°06′21″N 94°35′42″W		
147	West Eleventh Street Historic District	West Eleventh Street Historic District	September 9, 1982 (#82003148)	Central and W. 11th Sts. 39°06′04″N 94°35′12″W	Downtown	
148	West Ninth Street–Baltimore Avenue Historic District	West Ninth Street–Baltimore Avenue Historic District	November 7, 1976 (#76001113)	Roughly bounded by Main, 8th, 10th, and Central Sts.; also the western side of the 100 block of 10th St. and the 1000 block of Baltimore Ave.; also 807-815 Wyandotte; 39°06′12″N 94°35′05″W	Downtown	Second group of boundaries and the Wyandotte address represent boundary increases of November 20, 2002 and October 12, 2010
149	Western Newspaper Union Building	Western Newspaper Union Building	March 21, 2007 (#07000170)	304 W. 10th St. 39°06′09″N 94°35′14″W	Downtown	
150	Wholesale District		October 25, 1979 (#79001375)	Roughly bounded by 6th, Wyandotte, 8th, May, 11th, and Washington Sts.; also 701 Broadway & 330 W. 8th St. 39°06′14″N 94°35′15″W	Quality Hill, Downtown	Second set of boundaries represents a boundary increase on April 23, 2013
151	WILLIAM S. MITCHELL (dredge)		October 9, 1985 (#85003102)	Army Corps of Engineer Harbor; 39°06′51″N 94°34′56″W	River Market	Destroyed in a 1993 flood.

== Former listing ==
	Name on the Register	Image	Date listed	Date removed	Location	City or town	Description
1	Alana Apartment Hotel	Alana Apartment Hotel	July 5, 2006 (#06000543)	January 7, 2025	2700-2706 Troost Ave. and 1015 E. 27th St. 39°04′39″N 94°34′16″W	Longfellow/Dutch Hill	Demolished in 2018.
2	Blackstone Hotel	Blackstone Hotel	October 18, 2003 (#03001057)	January 7, 2025	817 Cherry St. 39°06′13″N 94°34′33″W	Downtown	Demolished
3	Emery, Bird and Thayer Building	Emery, Bird and Thayer Building	January 7, 1972 (#72001561)	April 5, 1973	1016-1018 Grand Ave.	Downtown	Demolished in 1972 and 1973.
4	Exchange Building		June 13, 2003 (#03000524)	January 7, 2025	1201-1207 Grand Boulevard; 39°06′06″N 94°34′49″W	Downtown	Demolished.
5	Gloyd Building		July 25, 1985 (#85001610)	January 7, 2025	921 Walnut St. 39°06′10″N 94°34′53″W	Downtown	Demolished by Dykon in 2002.
6	Grand Avenue Garage	Grand Avenue Garage	February 3, 2015 (#14001238)	January 7, 2025	718 Grand Ave. 39°06′18″N 94°34′52″W	Downtown	Demolished
7	Imperial Brewing Company Brewery	Imperial Brewing Company Brewery	February 11, 2011 (#11000011)	January 7, 2025	2825 Southwest Boulevard; 39°04′37″N 94°36′11″W	West Side	
8	Kansas City Public Library and Board of Education Building	Kansas City Public Library and Board of Education Building	October 24, 2017 (#100001350)	January 7, 2025	1211 McGee St. 39°05′58″N 94°34′47″W		Demolished in 2020.
9	National Garage		May 5, 2000 (#00000436)	January 7, 2025	1100-1110 McGee St. 39°06′12″N 94°34′47″W	Downtown	Demolished in 2004.
10	Smith and Sons Manufacturing Company Building		December 18, 2007 (#07001290)	January 7, 2025	1400-26 Guinotte Ave. 39°06′56″N 94°33′58″W	Columbus Park	Demolished about 2010.
11	Temple Block Building		June 19, 1985 (#85001344)	January 7, 2025	531 Walnut St. 39°06′27″N 94°34′49″W	River Market	Demolished.
12	The Wiltshire Apartment Hotel		June 27, 2014 (#14000377)	January 7, 2025	703 E. 10th St. 39°06′07″N 94°34′28″W	Downtown	Demolished 2013.

== See also ==
- List of National Historic Landmarks in Missouri
- National Register of Historic Places listings in Kansas City, Missouri
