= Ridenour =

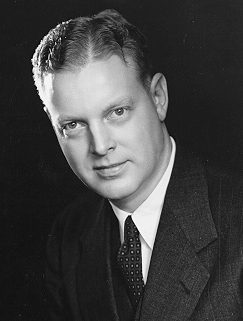
- Louis Ridenour, a physicist who carried the name

Ridenour is a surname, an Americanized form of German Reitenauer or Alsatian Reutenauer. Rednour, Ridenhour, Ridnour, and Ritenour are variants of the surname.

== People ==
- Amy Ridenour (1959–2017), American conservative activist
- Breland Ridenour, American politician and candidate in the 2022 Nebraska gubernatorial election
- James M. Ridenour (born 1942), director of the National Park Service
- Louis Ridenour (1911–1959), American physicist
- Matt Ridenour, bassist of Hawthorne Heights
- Payton Ridenour (born 2002), American BMX rider
- William Ridenour (born 1958), American politician

== See also ==
- Ridenour-Baker Grocery Company Building, Kansas City, Missouri, United States
