= Graphic Arts Building =

Graphic Arts Building may refer to:

- Graphic Arts Building (Kansas City, Missouri), listed on the National Register of Historic Places (NRHP) in Missouri
- Graphic Arts Building (Dayton, Ohio), listed on the NRHP in Ohio
- Graphic Arts Building (Toronto), still standing
- Graphic Art Building (Toronto), demolished, was at the Canadian National Exhibition
