= District I =

District I may refer to:

- District I (Hotels in Downtown Kansas City TR), Kansas City, Missouri, listed on the NRHP in Missouri
- District I (Armour Boulevard MRA), Kansas City, Missouri, listed on the NRHP in Missouri
