= Western Union Telegraph Building (Kansas City) =

Historic building in Kansas City, Missouri, U.S.

- Kansas City, Missouri Western Union Telegraph Building
- U.S. National Register of Historic Places
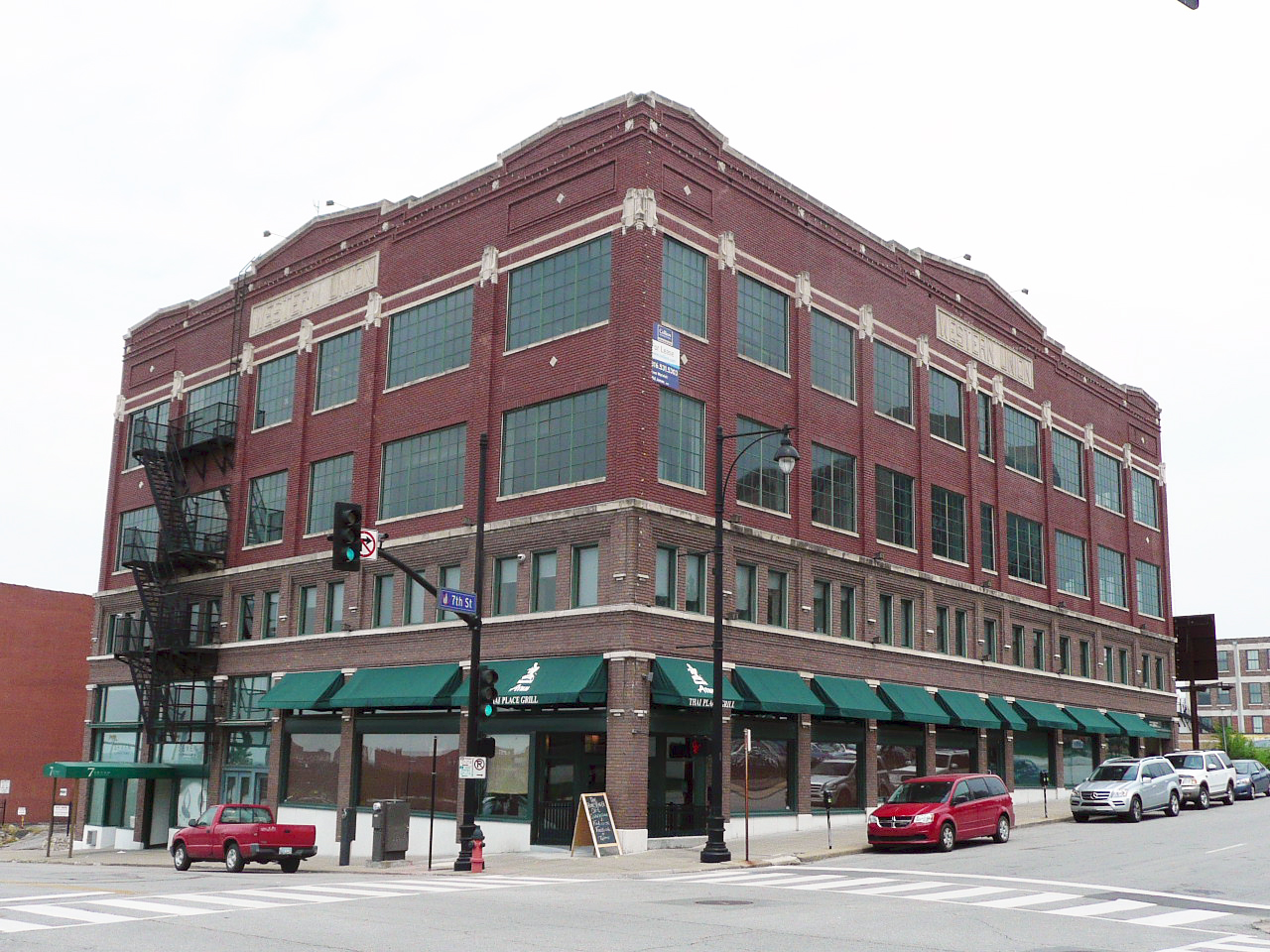

- Location within Missouri Location within the United States
- Location: 100-114 E. 7th St., Kansas City, Missouri
- Coordinates: 39°6′20″N 94°34′53″W
- Area: less than one acre
- Built: 1920
- Architect: Smith, Charles A.; Van Sant, J.R., Construction Co.
- Architectural style: Early Commercial
- NRHP reference No.: 03000010
- Added to NRHP: February 12, 2003

The Western Union Telegraph Building in Kansas City, Missouri, is a former telecommunications building from 1920. It was listed on the National Register of Historic Places in 2003.

== History ==
Western Union began operations in Kansas City in 1865. In 1915, the company started planning a new regional hub in the city and began construction in 1919. The facility opened in 1920. Western Union continued its telecommunication operations in the building until the late 1970s. The building was listed on the National Register of Historic Places on February 12, 2003. In 2014, technology company The Nerdery moved into the Western Union building.

== Architecture ==
The building is a four-story Commercial style structure. The concrete building is covered in a brick veneer, brown on the lower two floors and red on the upper two. The Walnut Street and 7th Street facades are divided into six bays and ten bays, respectively. Below the cornice on each facade is a terra cotta sign that reads "WESTERN UNION".

== See also ==
- National Register of Historic Places listings in Downtown Kansas City, Missouri
