= Smith v. Kansas City Title & Trust Co. =

Smith v. Kansas City Title & Trust
- Supreme Court of the United States

Argued January 6–8, 1920 Reargued October 14–15, 1920 Decided February 28, 1921
- Full case name: Smith v. Kansas City Title & Trust Company
- Citations: 255 U.S. 180 (more) 41 S. Ct. 243; 65 L. Ed. 577

Holding
- Because of federal-question jurisdiction, the Court was allowed to rule that the Federal Farm Loan Act of 1916 was constitutional and that the District Court had jurisdiction to rule as such.

Court membership
- Chief Justice Edward D. White Associate Justices Joseph McKenna · Oliver W. Holmes Jr. William R. Day · Willis Van Devanter; Mahlon Pitney · James C. McReynolds; Louis Brandeis · John H. Clarke

Case opinions
- Majority: Day, joined by White, McKenna, Van Devanter, Pitney, Clarke
- Dissent: Holmes, joined by McReynolds
- Brandeis took no part in the consideration or decision of the case.

Laws applied
- Article III of the United States Constitution (Section II)

Smith v. Kansas City Title & Trust Co., 255 U.S. 180 (1921), was a United States Supreme Court case that helped define the range and scope of federal question jurisdiction in state corporate law matters. The case dealt with whether or not a district court had the power to uphold the constitutional validity of the Federal Farm Loan Act of 1916.

== Background ==
Charles E. Smith, a shareholder of Kansas City Title & Trust Company, challenged the company's investment in farm loan bonds. The plaintiff (Smith) sued by filing an action in the United States District Court for the Western District of Missouri. The suit was filed to prevent the state bank from buying the federal bonds, claiming that the Federal Farm Loan Act of 1916, the law in which the transaction was based on, was unconstitutional.

Kansas City Title & Trust Co. was authorized to invest funds in legal securities only. The plaintiff was against investing money into federal land bonds ($10,000 into bonds of the federal land banks and $10,000 into bonds of the joint-stock land banks) because he alleged that the Congress's undertaking to organize new banks, based on the Federal Farm Loan Act, was unconstitutional. The Western District Court of Missouri ruled that the Federal Farm Loan act was constitutional, making it so the Kansas City Title & Trust Co. could invest in farm loan bonds. The plaintiff wanted further relief on the matter, so the case went to the Supreme Court.

Before stating the holding, it is important to explain what the Federal Farm Loan Act was, what federal-question jurisdiction is, and how they pertain to this case.

=== The Federal Farm Loan Act of 1916 ===
President Woodrow Wilson signed the Federal Farm Loan Act of 1916 into law.

The Federal Farm Loan Act was instated to increase credit to rural farmers to help small farmers compete with large corporate farms. After the Act was passed, farmers could borrow up to 50% of the value of their land. Mortgage-backed bonds were issued. "The rate of interest on the mortgages could be no more than 1 percent higher than the rate of interest on the bonds. This spread covered the issuers' administrative costs, but did not lead to a significant profit. In addition, the maximum rate of interest on the bonds was 6 percent, ensuring that borrowing costs for farmers was often much lower than before the Act was passed." The Act led to the creation of new banks. The new law gave extra financial sympathy to farmers, as stated in a letter to the chair of the United States House Committee on Agriculture: "It was essential, however, that banking machinery be devised which would reach intimately into the rural districts, that it should operate on terms suited to the farmer's needs, and should be under sympathetic management." The Act was signed into law by President Woodrow Wilson on July 17, 1916.

=== Why Was The FFLA Thought to be Unconstitutional? ===
Charles Smith believed that Congress had overstepped its bounds in creating the Federal Farm Loan Act. "It was the contention of Smith, among other things, that although farm loan bonds purported to be tax exempt, Congress had exceeded its constitutional authority in providing for the creation of federal and joint-stock land banks with the power to issue tax-exempt bonds; and that therefore these bonds were improper securities for the investment of trust company funds." Smith thought that Congress did not have the right to create new banks and issue tax exempt bonds. Similarly, Law Writer Charles Enslow challenged the Act prior to Smith stating "Congress only has the affirmative power to tax, not the authorization to exempt from taxation any State property. The Federal Farm Loan Bank is nothing more nor less than a corporation chartered by the National Government, and whose sole object is to secure from a certain class of people of the United States money to be loaned to another class of people at a reduced interest rate." Enslow thought that the Act favored farmers over other specialized workers and thought that the government does not have the right to help one group of citizens while leaving others behind.

=== Federal-question Jurisdiction ===
Federal courts have limited jurisdiction compared to state courts. Federal courts can only rule over cases with subject matter dealing with Congress or the Constitution. Federal-question jurisdiction gives the federal court subject-matter jurisdiction to hear a civil case because the appellant has claimed a violation of the Constitution.

Federal-question jurisdiction was used by the Supreme Court to hear this case. By claiming the Federal Farm Loan Act unconstitutional, the appellant created a federal suit.

== Issue ==
Was the District Court allowed to and correct in upholding the Constitutional validity of the Federal Farm Loan Act?

== Holding ==
The court gave opinions on two separate matters: The District Court's jurisdiction and the Constitutionality of the Federal Farm Loan Act.

=== Jurisdiction of the District Court ===
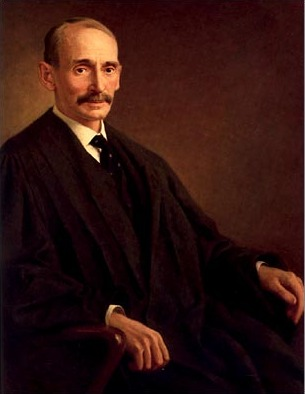
Justice William R. Day authored the majority opinion for Smith v. KC Title & Trust Co.

The Court ruled that "even where a cause of action arises under state law, a federal court may have jurisdiction if it appears that the right to relief rests on the construction or application of a federal law." Justice Day ruled that the District Court had jurisdiction, stating, "the general rule is that where it appears from the bill or statement of the plaintiff that the right to relief depends upon the construction or application of the Constitution or laws of the United States, and that such federal claim is not merely colorable, and rests upon a reasonable foundation, the District Court has jurisdiction under this provision." So, since this case dealt with federal matters, the Supreme Court ruled that the District Court still has jurisdiction under certain circumstances.

=== Constitutionality of the Federal Farm Loan Act ===
The Supreme Court affirmed the District Court's decision that the Federal Farm Loan Act is, in fact, constitutional. "The provision of the Federal Farm Loan Act of July 17, 1916, amended January 18, 1918, making the Federal Land Banks and Joint Stock Land Banks established thereunder depositaries of public money when designated by the Secretary of the Treasury, authorizing their employment as financial agents of the government, requiring them to perform, as such depositaries and agents, such reasonable duties as may be laid upon them, and authorizing them to purchase government bonds justify their creation as an exercise of the constitutional power of Congress. The necessity for such federal agencies is for Congress to determine, and the motives actuating Congress in exercising its power to create them are not a subject for judicial scrutiny."

=== Dissenting Opinion ===
Justice Holmes dissented because he thought that the issue did not "arise under" federal law. He did not think that the Supreme Court had jurisdiction because the cause of action was created by state law and not federal law.

== Effects of the Decision ==
The upholding of the Federal Farm Loan Act was a decision that improved the livelihood of many American farmers, increased the power of Congress, and helped better define federal-question jurisdiction.

After the supreme court ruling, one newspaper headline proclaimed, "Decision which Establishes Constitutionality of Agricultural Credit Act Declared Greatest Victory for Farmers. Tax Exempt Feature of Bonds is also Sustained, Many Millions of Dollars of Credit Forthcoming to Farmers." Another newspaper wrote, "The decision is expected to aid greatly in relieving the financial distress now confronting agricultural interests. The positive effect that the act had on farmers still holds true today, as one news article posted July 24, 2006 reads, "Leaders Celebrate 90 Years of Federal Farm Loan Act."

Congress's ability to pass an act that created new banks for farmers that allowed tax exemptions was unprecedented. Also, the Supreme Court's ruling gave a new precedent for federal-question jurisdiction. The ruling for Smith v. Kansas City Title & Trust Co. took power from state law and gave power to federal law. By ruling on the constitutionality of the issue, the Supreme Court took a district case and made it federal. By doing so, the court redefined the boundaries for federal-question jurisdiction.

== See also ==
- Pollock v. Farmers' Loan & Trust Co.
- Brushaber v. Union Pacific R.R. Co.
- Kansas City Title and Trust Building
