= Kansas City Title and Trust Building =

- U.S. National Register of Historic Places
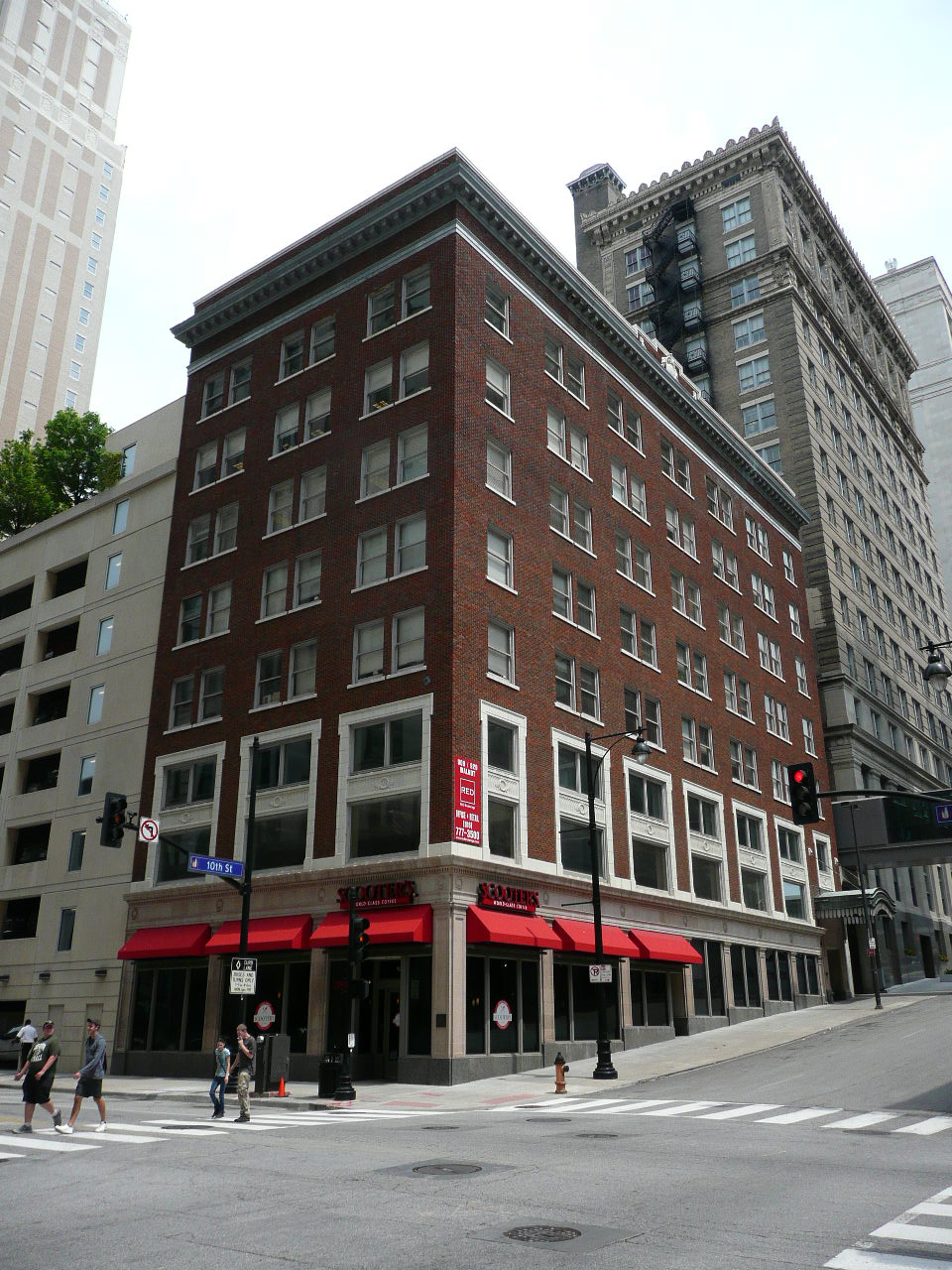

- Location within Missouri Location within the United States
- Location: 927 Walnut St. Kansas City, Missouri
- Coordinates: 39°6′9″N 94°34′54″W
- Area: less than one acre
- Built: 1922
- Architect: Sunderland and Besecke; Mosby-Goodrich Construction Co.
- Architectural style: Early Commercial
- NRHP reference No.: 05000624
- Added to NRHP: June 25, 2005

The Kansas City Title and Trust Building in Kansas City, Missouri, is a building from 1922. It was listed on the National Register of Historic Places in 2005.

== History ==
The building was designed by the firm Sunderland and Besecke, and built by Mosby-Goodrich Construction Company. Construction of the building began on August 1, 1922.

== Architecture and setting ==
The building is a seven-story structure in the Commercial style. The building is situated on an incline at the corner of Walnut Street and 10th Street in central business district of Kansas City.

The facade is divided into three bays on Walnut Street and seven bays on 10th Street. The structure is built of reinforced concrete with a red-colored brick facade. Cream-colored terra cotta decorates the base.

== See also ==
- National Register of Historic Places listings in Downtown Kansas City, Missouri
- Smith v. Kansas City Title & Trust Co.
