= National Bank of Commerce Building (Kansas City, Missouri) =

Office skyscraper in Kansas City, Missouri

- U.S. National Register of Historic Places
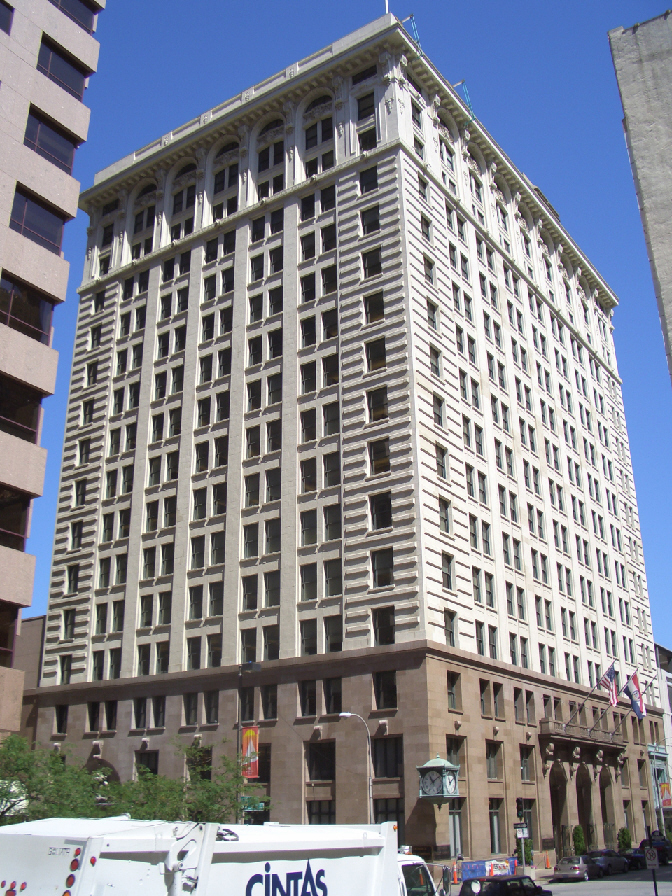
- Commerce Trust Building, Kansas City, Missouri

- Location within Missouri Location within the United States
- Location: 922-924 Walnut St., Kansas City, Missouri
- Coordinates: 39°6′15″N 94°34′55″W
- Area: less than one acre
- Built: 1908
- Architect: Jarvis Hunt; Fuller, George A. Co.
- Architectural style: Skyscraper
- NRHP reference No.: 99000530
- Added to NRHP: May 05, 1999

The National Bank of Commerce Building in Kansas City, Missouri is a building in the Classical Revival architecture. It was listed on the National Register of Historic Places in 1993.

== See also ==
- Tallest buildings in Kansas City
- National Register of Historic Places listings in Downtown Kansas City
