= Midland Theatre =

Theater in Kansas City, Missouri

The Midland Theatre
- Loew's Midland Theatre (1927–61); Midland Stadium (1961–62); Saxon Theatre (1962–66); Midland 1-2-3 Theatre (1966–77); Midland Theatre (1977–2008); The Midland by AMC (2008–13); Arvest Bank Theatre at The Midland (2013 - 2022)
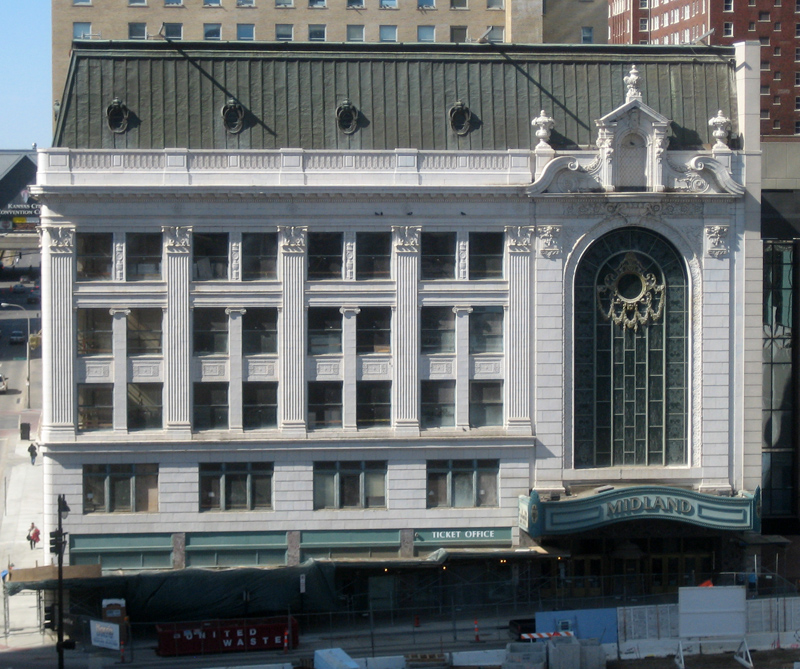
- Facade of theatre, 2007
- Interactive map of The Midland Theatre
- Address: 1228 Main Street; Kansas City, Missouri; United States
- Owner: The Cordish Company
- Operator: AEG Presents
- Capacity: 3,200 (2008–present); 3,573 (original)

Construction
- Opened: October 27, 1927
- Rebuilt: 1961, 1988, 1998, 2008
- Architects: Robert O. Boller; Thomas W. Lamb

Website
- midlandkc.com
- Loew's Midland Theater-Midland Building
- U.S. National Register of Historic Places
- Coordinates: 39°5′56″N 94°35′1″W
- NRHP reference No.: 77000808
- Added to NRHP: September 28, 1977

The Midland Theatre is a 3,000-seat theater located in the Power & Light District of Kansas City, Missouri, United States. The National Collegiate Athletic Association under Walter Byers had its headquarters in the building from the 1950s until it moved to 6299 Nall Avenue at Shawnee Mission Parkway in Mission, Kansas in 1971. The theatre was originally known as the Loew's Midland Theatre until 1961. Over the years, the theatre has been known by various names including: Saxon Theatre, Midland Stadium, Midland 1-2-3 Theatre, Midland Theatre and The Midland by AMC, and Arvest Bank Theatre at The Midland.

== Design ==
Construction of the Midland Theatre in May, 1927

It was built by Marcus Loew, completed in 1927, at a cost of $4 million and was the largest historic theater within 250 miles of the city. The Midland was designed by architect Thomas W. Lamb of New York and the Boller Brothers of Kansas City, and Boaz-Kiel Construction of St. Louis erected the structure. The theatre, built in French and Italian Baroque, was representative of Lamb's work in the late 1920s.

The exterior of the theatre was constructed in a Renaissance Revival style in cream glazed terra cotta brick, adorned with engaged pilasters, winged figures, leaves, flowers, swags, volutes, urns, and arches. A four-story arched window rose above a copper and gold marquee that contained 3,600 light bulbs.

At the time the Loew's Midland opened, it was home to a Robert Morton theatre pipe organ. The organ was used at the theatre until after World War II, when larger screen sound movies eventually resulted in the end for stage shows and in-house organ music. The organ began to deteriorate from lack of use until it was purchased and removed in the 1960s by Robert Fray and placed in his home. After the organ changed hands and was moved across the country several more times, it was eventually purchased by local enthusiasts in 1984 and is now at home in the Kansas City Music Hall.

The Midland closed in January 1961, and then after some remodeling, it briefly reopened as an arena that served as the home for Kansas City's professional bowling team, the Kansas City Stars. The Stars were financially unsuccessful, and they left the Midland in December of the same year.

== AMC Ownership ==
AMC Theatres (then a small Kansas City-area regional chain) purchased the Midland in 1966, and the theatre continued to operate as a movie house until 1981. In conjunction with the AMC Empire Theater, located two blocks south, the complex was known as the AMC Midland-Empire. Since then, it has become a performance hall, still used today for concerts, Broadway and stage shows, ballet and other events. It has also served as the Kansas City home of the annual Radio City Christmas Spectacular over more recent years. The theatre was placed on the National Register of Historic Places in 1977.

== Redevelopment ==
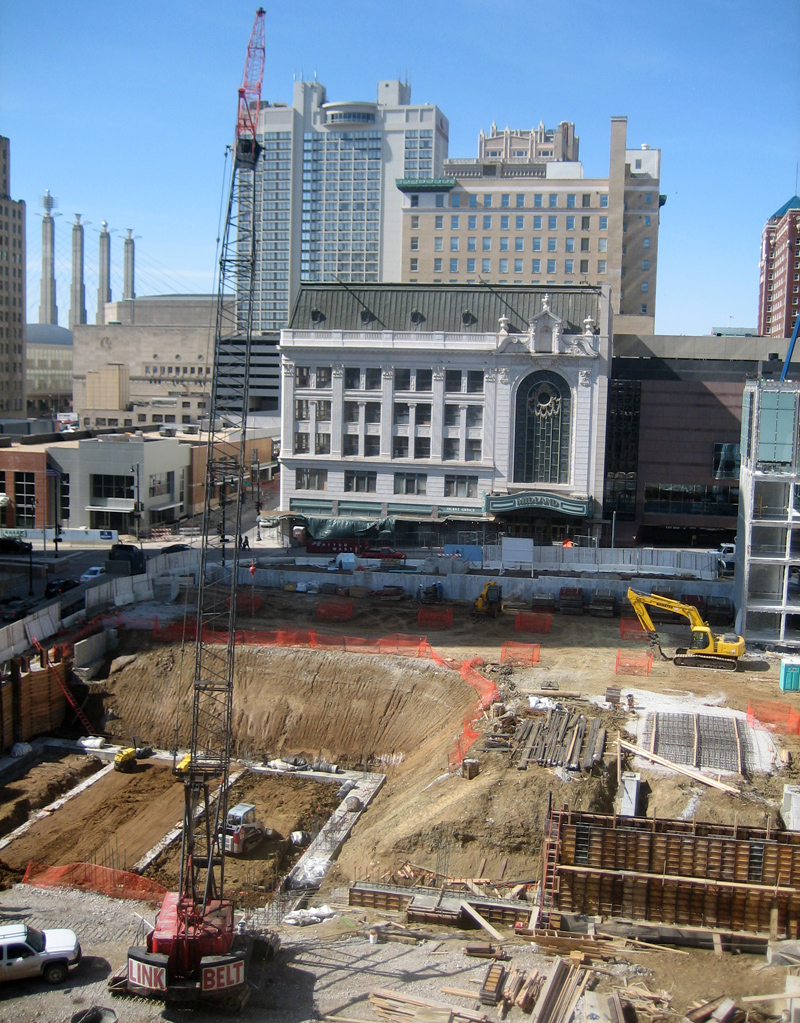
Construction and renovation that took place in the theater area as part of the Power & Light District development

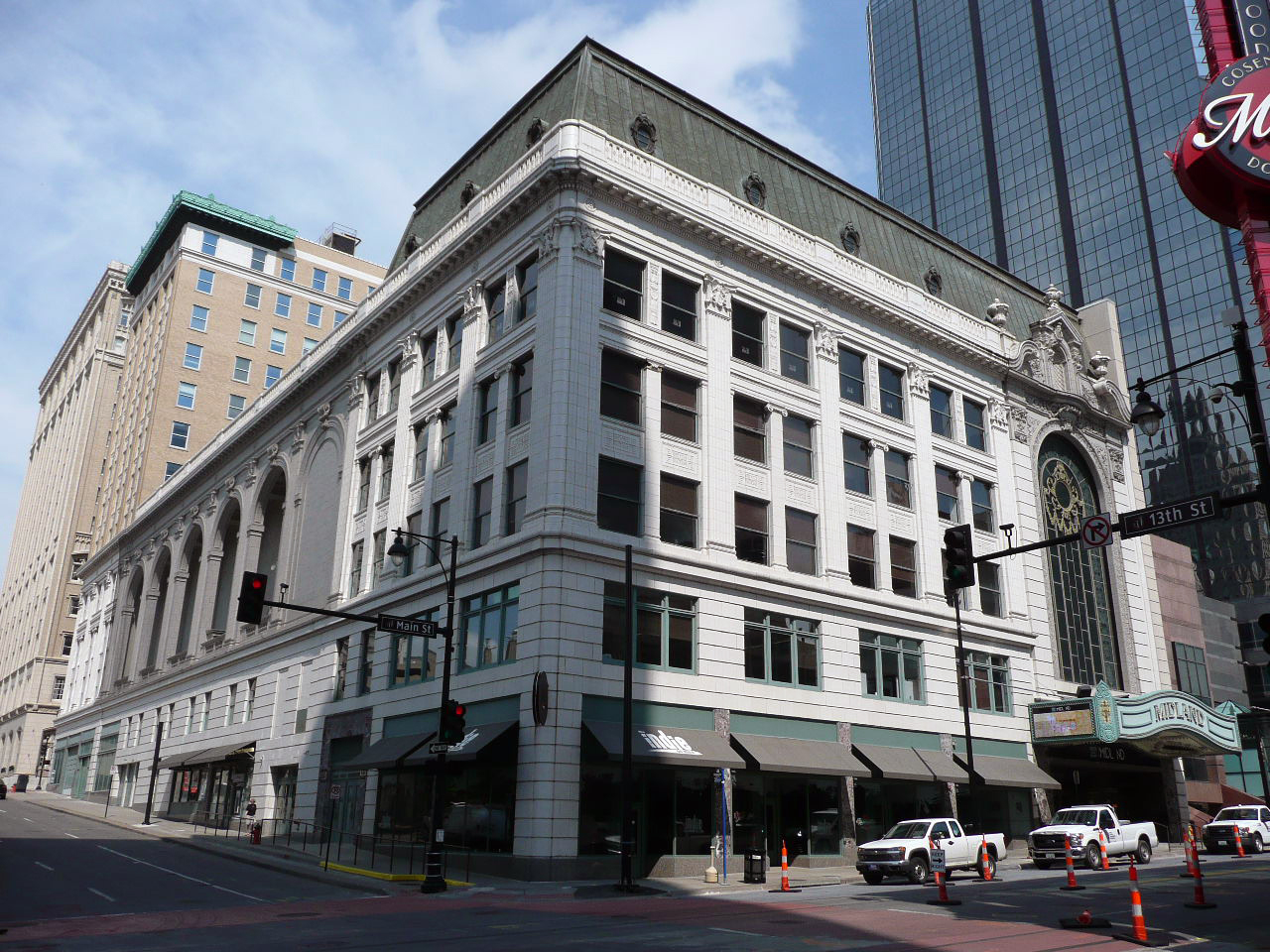
The Midland Theater, as seen from the intersection of 13th and Main

In 2007, AEG Live and the Cordish Company formed a partnership to undertake a multimillion-dollar renovation of the historic venue. Since reopening in late 2008, the theater was called the Midland by AMC and hosted events promoted by the AEG Presents (formerly AEG Live) company.

Among the major changes made in the redevelopment, the main-level seating rows were removed and replaced with a tiered open floor plan that allows for cabaret-style tables and chairs, or standing room for general admission events. The Midland's exterior marquee was restored to its original 1927 appearance. The five level office portion of the theatre that faces Main Street was converted into a mix of bars, lounges, and administrative space. According to the Cordish Company of Baltimore, the developer of the project, all changes meet historic preservation guidelines as required by state and federal governments.

On September 4, 2013, AEG Live, the Cordish Company and Arvest Bank announced that the bank had acquired a multi-year naming rights partnership to the Midland Theatre. The announcement coincided with a celebration of the fifth anniversary of the theater's re-launch in September 2008. The venue's name officially became the Arvest Bank Theatre at The Midland on September 13, 2013.

== See also ==
- National Register of Historic Places listings in Downtown Kansas City
