= Kellogg-Mackay Company Buildings =

Historical buildings

- U.S. National Register of Historic Places
- Location within Missouri Location within the United States
- Location: 2020-2030 Walnut St. Kansas City, Missouri
- Coordinates: 39.0881°N 94.5827°W
- Area: 0.52 acres (0.21 ha)
- Built: 1892 & 1926
- Built by: Harvey Stiver (1926 builder)
- Architect: Walter A. Besecke & James C. Sunderland (1926 architects)
- NRHP reference No.: 100007816
- Added to NRHP: 2022-06-27

The Kellogg-Mackay Company Buildings are two warehouses located in Kansas City, Missouri which have been used by various companies for manufacturing, transfer, storage, and administrative purposes, most significantly by the Kellogg-Mackay Company from 1919 to 1930. Due to their connection to historical railroad-related commerce in Kansas City, the buildings were listed on the National Register of Historic Places on June 27, 2022.

== Site ==
The buildings are located in the Crossroads, approximately 0.25 miles (0.40 km) northeast of Union Station. The buildings are privately owned, but the nominated boundary extends into the public right-of-way to include a concrete loading dock located on the east side of the buildings.

Rail spur lines used to be present on the west elevation that would have allowed for the transfer of goods from rail cars to the building, however, these are no longer visible.

== Architecture ==
The southernmost building, 2026-2030 Walnut Street, was constructed in 1892. The original architect and builder are unknown. It is three-stories tall and made of brick. It has an open floor plate and its structure is typical for the period with load-bearing brick exterior walls and a heavy timber internal structural system. The foundation is stone.

The newer northern building, 2020-2024 Walnut Street, was constructed in 1926 and abuts the side of the older building. Walter A. Besecke is the only architect that appears on the building permit, but the building is also attributed to architect James C. Sunderland. The builder was Harvey Stiver. The building is five-stories tall and made of brick and concrete. During construction, openings were cut which allow access between the two buildings. 2020-2024 Walnut Street has an open floor plate like 2026-2030 Walnut Street, however, unlike 2026-2030 Walnut, 2020-2024 Walnut has an internal concrete structural system.

The loading dock was first added in 1943, but only expanded to its current size between 1951 and 1963. The roof of the 1943 portion can be distinguished because it sits lower than the circa 1963 portion.

== Uses ==
The buildings have been commercial since their original construction. The buildings were associated with the railways until 1961, when they were acquired by a tenant that did not rely on the railway to transport goods. As of May 10, 2022, the buildings were vacant.

Timeline of Historical Uses
Dates	Tenant(s)	Known Uses
1892	Roach & Musser Manufacturing Company	The original building at 2026-2030 was constructed for use by this company. It was used for the manufacturing of windows and doors.
1919-1931	The Kellog-Mackay Company	In 1919, The Kellog-Mackay Company purchased the building at 2026-2030 Walnut and converted it for use as a storage and transfer warehouse for plumbing and heating products. In 1926, Kellog-Mackay added the building at 2020-2024 Walnut as part of an expansion. After the expansion, the older building was used primarily for storage and warehousing. Kellog-Mackay remained at the properties until 1930, when the company entered bankruptcy and its inventory at the buildings was liquidated.
1931-1934	Vacant	
1934-1943	Various Tenants	Tenants during this period include the Johns-Mansville Company (1934), Moser and Suro Inc., Motoer Equitment Corporation, Bird and Son Floor Covering, Mohawk Rubber Company Tires, and Walnut Storage and Distribution Company.
1943-1961	The Midwest Terminal Warehouse Company	In 1943, The Midwest Terminal Warehouse Company acquired the Walnut Storage and Distribution Company and the buildings. The Midwest Terminal Warehouse Company operated out of the properties the until 1961.
1961-2020	Superior Moving and Storage Company	From 1961 to 2020, the Superior Moving and Storage Company operated out of the buildings. The Superior Moving sign is still visible on the exterior of the properties.
2020–Present	Vacant	
