= Palace Clothing Company Building =

- U.S. National Register of Historic Places
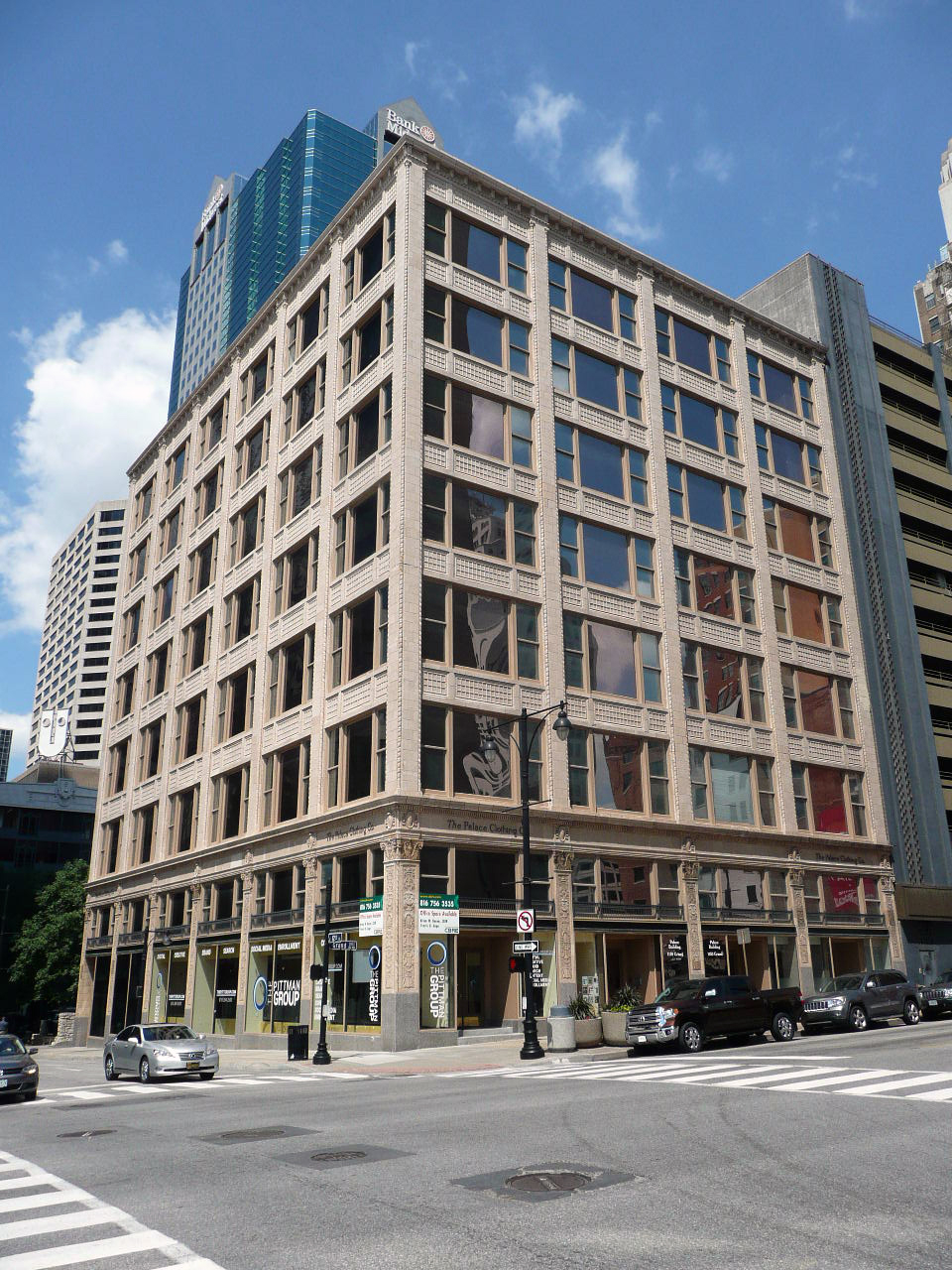

- Location within Missouri Location within the United States
- Interactive map showing the location of the Palace Clothing Company Building
- Location: 1126-1128 Grand Ave., Kansas City, Missouri
- Coordinates: 39°6′0″N 94°34′51″W
- Area: less than one acre
- Built: 1924
- Architect: McIlvain, Frederic E.
- Architectural style: Chicago
- NRHP reference No.: 85000102
- Added to NRHP: January 18, 1985

The Palace Clothing Company Building in Kansas City, Missouri is a building constructed in 1924. It was listed on the National Register of Historic Places in 1985.

== History ==
The Palace Clothing Company Building was designed in 1924 by Kansas City Architect Frederic E. McIlvain in the Chicago School style of architecture. The Palace Clothing Company was established in 1893 in Kansas City by Henry Guettel and Henry Auerbach. The building was at the time, one of the largest clothing stores in the West and specialized in men's and boy's clothing. From 1921 onward, the business grew from a $1.5 million volume to exceeding $6 million of business before the company closed in 1964. At its peak, the Palace Clothing Company was one of the largest clothing stores in the world with 275 feet of store frontage. The building sat vacant until 1972, when it was renovated with a metal facade and an interior remodeling. The metal facade was removed in 1984, revealing the historic character of the exterior. The building was listed on the National Register of Historic Places in 1985.

== Architecture ==
Designed in the Chicago School style of architecture, the building expresses the utilitarian and structural function of the building. It emphasizes openness and mass, while also pointing to the elegance and flexibility of the "neutral cage". The exterior of the building is primarily terra cotta and brick with ornamentation and cartouche features.
