= Liquid Carbonic Company Building =

- U.S. National Register of Historic Places

- Location within Missouri Location within the United States
- Location: 2000 Baltimore St., Kansas City, Missouri
- Coordinates: 39°5′21″N 94°35′4″W
- Area: less than one acre
- Built: 1913
- Architect: Smith, Rea, and Lovitt; Hucke & Sexton
- Architectural style: Late 19th And Early 20th Century American Movements
- NRHP reference No.: 94000365
- Added to NRHP: April 29, 1994

The Liquid Carbonic Company Building is a historic building Kansas City, Missouri. Built in 1913, it was listed on the National Register of Historic Places in 1994. The Liquid Carbonic Company was a manufacturer of soda fountains.
