= Kansas City Water Department Building =

- U.S. National Register of Historic Places
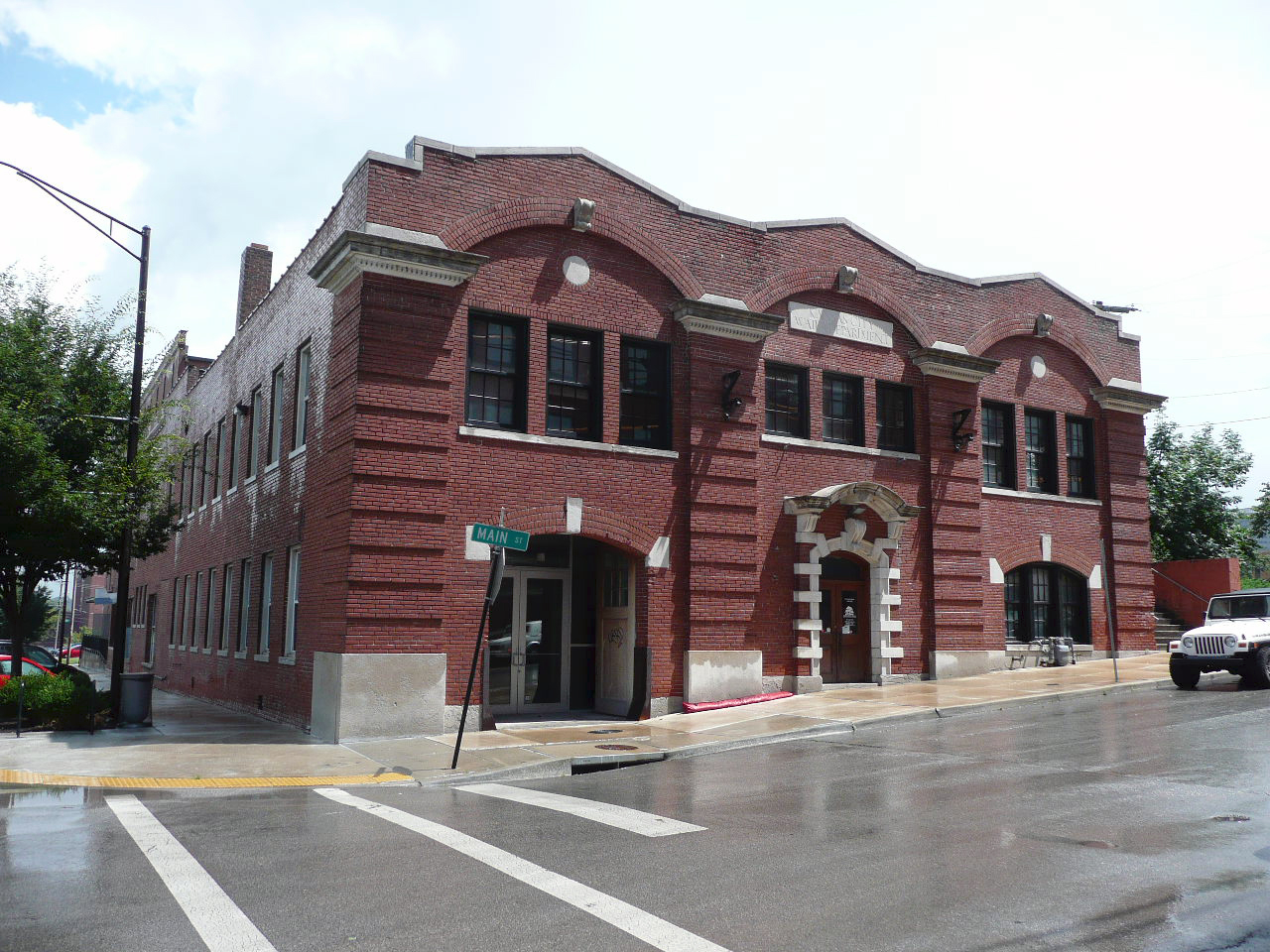

- Location within Missouri Location within the United States
- Location: 201 Main St., Kansas City, Missouri
- Coordinates: 39°6′38″N 94°34′59″W
- Area: less than one acre
- Built: 1904
- Architectural style: Late 19th And 20th Century Revivals
- NRHP reference No.: 94000290
- Added to NRHP: April 07, 1994

The Kansas City Water Department Building in Kansas City, Missouri is a building from 1904. It was listed on the National Register of Historic Places in 1994.
