= Kansas City Cold Storage Company Building =

- U.S. National Register of Historic Places
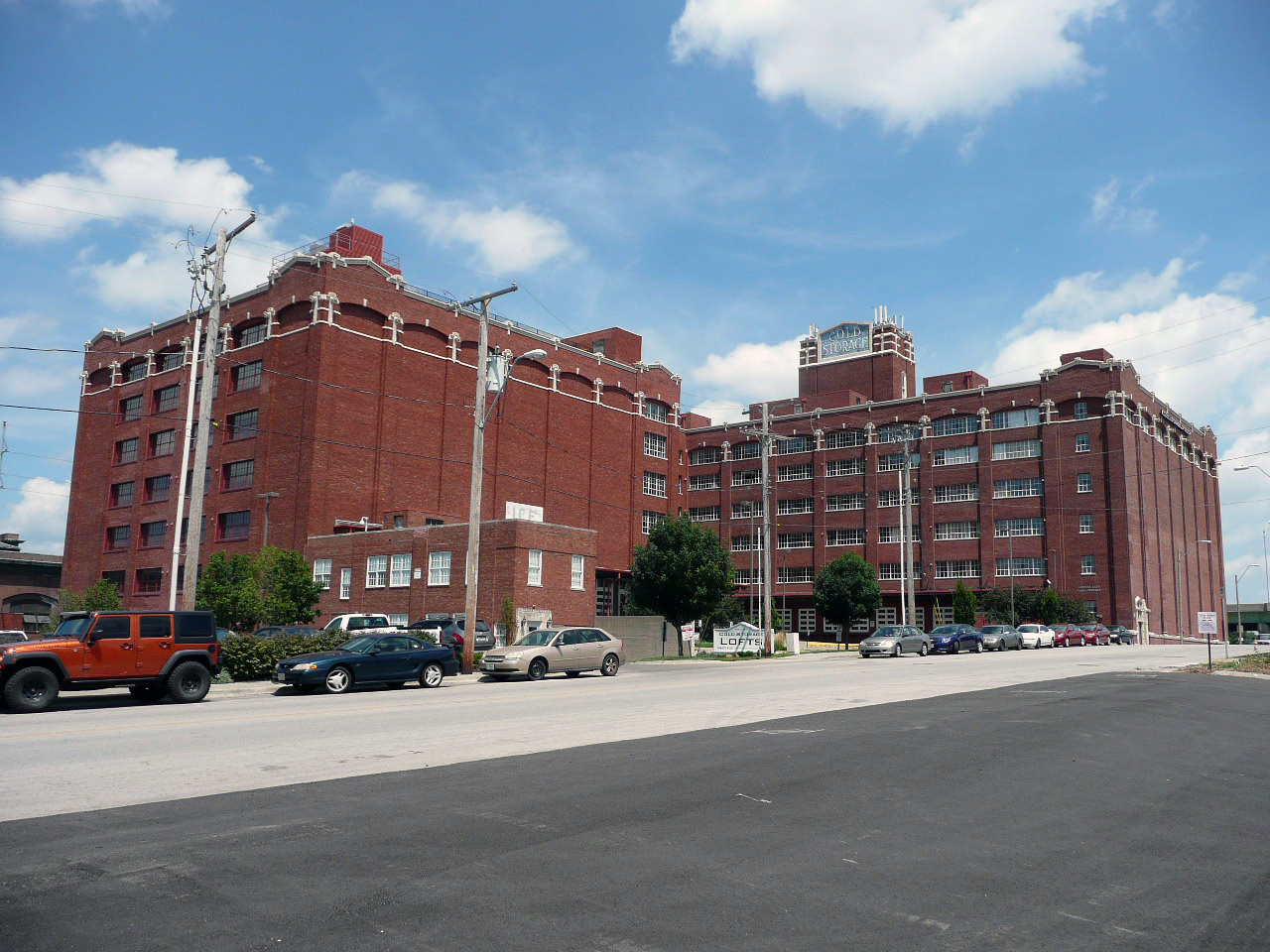
- Kansas City Cold Storage Company Building in 2015

- Location within Missouri Location within the United States
- Location: 500 E. 3rd St., Kansas City, Missouri
- Coordinates: 39°6′48″N 94°34′44″W
- Area: less than one acre
- Built: 1922
- Architect: Joy, S. Scott; Epstein, Abraham
- Architectural style: Tudor Revival
- MPS: Railroad Related Historic Commercial and Industrial Resources in Kansas City, Missouri MPS
- NRHP reference No.: 05000510
- Added to NRHP: June 01, 2005

The Kansas City Cold Storage Company Building, also known as Cold Storage Lofts, is a historic industrial building located at 500 East 3rd Street in the River Market neighborhood of Kansas City, Missouri. Originally constructed in 1922 and expanded in 1928, the six-story structure served for over 80 years as a major cold storage and food distribution hub. It was listed on the National Register of Historic Places in 2006. In 2007, the building was converted into a residential apartment complex.

== History ==
The Kansas City Cold Storage Company Building's development was tied to the growth of Kansas City as a regional and national rail hub in the early 20th century. Its construction was driven by outside investors seeking to capitalize on the city's role in the national ice, fruit, and vegetable markets. The building's strategic location adjacent to the Kansas City Southern Railway's 2nd Street corridor, Missouri River, and its proximity to the wholesale produce operations in the River Market and Old Town industrial district were key factors in its development.

The initial phase of construction, completed in 1922, was commissioned by the United States Cold Storage Company of Chicago at a cost of $1.5 million. The building was designed by architect S. Scott Joy, known for his industrial designs, and construction was overseen by H.E. Pronto. The facility was designed to optimize the flow of goods, with ice production and storage in two subterranean levels and specialized storage rooms for various commodities on the upper floors. It also featured loading docks to serve various modes of transportation. An agreement with local railroads facilitated the efficient shipment of perishable goods.

In 1928, a significant expansion, also costing $1.5 million, began. While initial plans were drawn by Joy, the revised plans for the new west block were executed by Chicago structural engineer Abraham Epstein. This expansion increased the building's storage capacity significantly. In 1945, a small two-story office block was added to the south side of the 1928 addition. In the 1980s, a freezer room was constructed at the northeast corner of the 1922 block.

The Kansas City Cold Storage Company operated 38 million cubic feet of refrigerated space within the building for approximately 80 years, playing a major role in the regional and national food distribution network. Following its period of industrial use, the building sat vacant. In the early 2000s, Garrison Development Company began a $37 million renovation, converting the former cold storage facility into a 226-unit apartment complex known as Cold Storage Lofts. The project was completed in 2007 and attempted to preserve many of the building’s historic features.

In 2020, Cold Storage Lofts was sold by Maxus Realty Trust Inc. to CLK Properties, which subsequently announced plans for further upgrades. The building was sold again to 29th Street Capital in 2022.
