= Safeway Stores Office and Warehouse Building =

- U.S. National Register of Historic Places
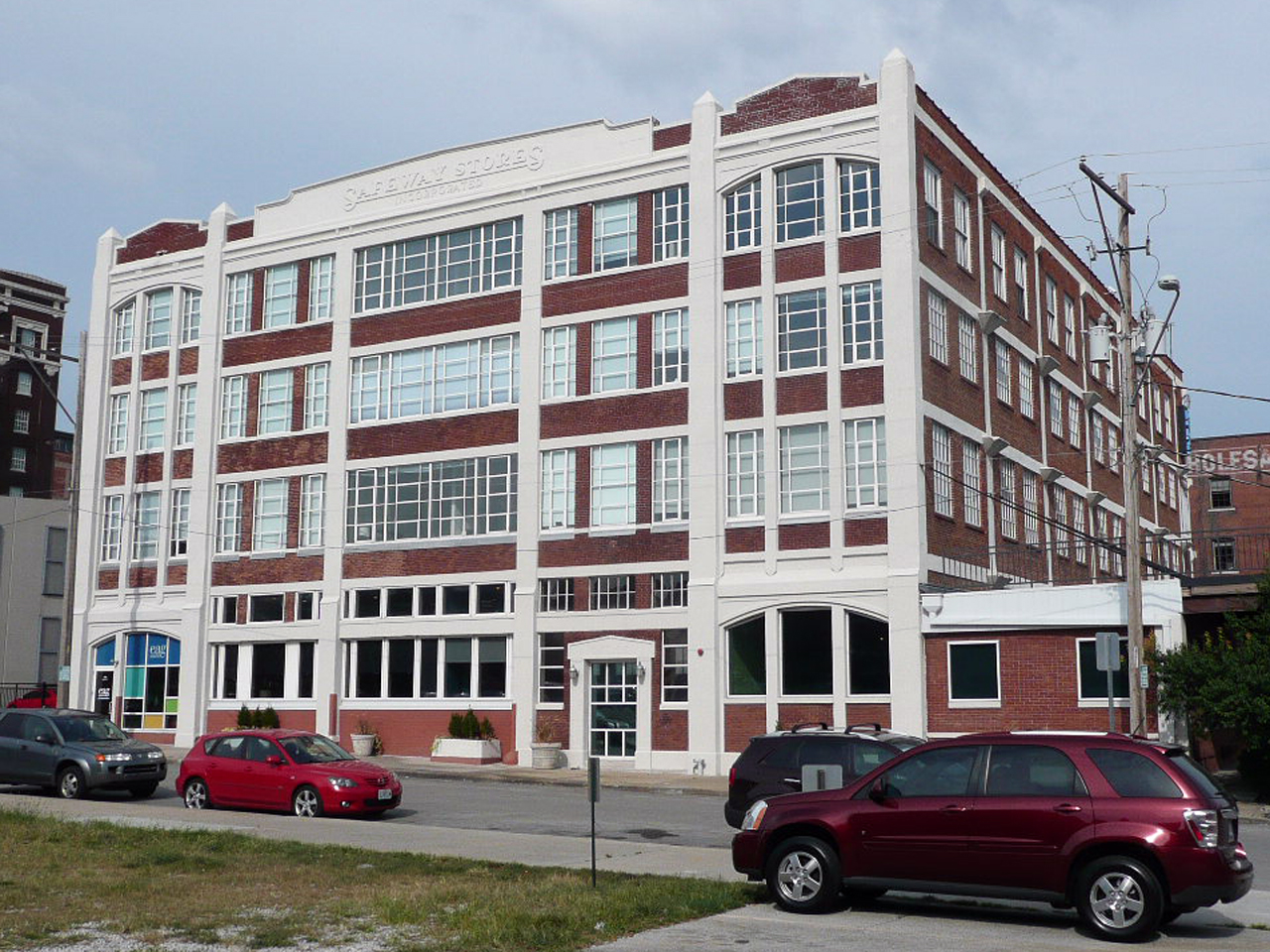
- Safeway Stores Office and Warehouse Building in 2015

- Location within Missouri Location within the United States
- Location: 2029-2043 Wyandotte St., Kansas City, Missouri
- Coordinates: 39°5′28″N 94°35′6″W
- Built: 1929
- Architect: Archer and Gloyd; Thompson, J.H.
- Architectural style: Early Commercial
- NRHP reference No.: 00000435
- Added to NRHP: May 05, 2000

The Safeway Stores Office and Warehouse Building is a historic building near downtown Kansas City, Missouri. The building was designed by Kansas City architects Archer and Gloyd and was built by local contractor J. H. Thompson in 1929. It served as Safeway's regional produce and canned goods warehouse, as well as the regional headquarters for the chain. The warehouse served a region extending from Topeka, Kansas in the west to St. Joseph, Missouri in the north, Columbia, Missouri in the east to Joplin, Missouri in the south.

The 84,000-square-foot (7,800 m^{2}) four-story building is approximately 100 feet (30 m) by 140 feet (43 m). The concrete structure is clad with brick and stone on the main (west) facade, while the remaining sides reveal the concrete. The interior is supported by concrete mushroom columns.

A loading dock was added in 1949. The facility was operated by Safeway until 1953, when it was purchased by the Halls Company. Another addition was made in 1976.
