= Ridenhour =

Ridenhour is a surname. Notable people with the surname include:

- Carlton Douglas Ridenhour (born 1960), a.k.a. Chuck D, American rapper, author, and producer
- Ronald Lee Ridenhour, soldier and journalist who helped expose the My Lai Massacre

== See also ==
- The Ridenhour Prizes, Humanitarian awards
