= Kansas City Parks and Boulevards Historic District =

- U.S. National Register of Historic Places
- Location: Kansas City, Missouri
- Coordinates: 39°04′57″N 94°33′18″W
- Area: 694.2 acres (2.809 km^{2})
- NRHP reference No.: 14000931
- Added to NRHP: August 9, 2016

The Kansas City Parks and Boulevards Historic District is a historic district which was listed on the National Register of Historic Places in 2016.

The listing includes a total of 40 contributing properties, including one building, 27 other structures, eight objects, and four sites.

The district includes Cliff Drive.
