= Sacred Heart Church, School and Rectory =

Historic church in Missouri, United States

- Sacred Heart Guadalupe Church
- U.S. National Register of Historic Places
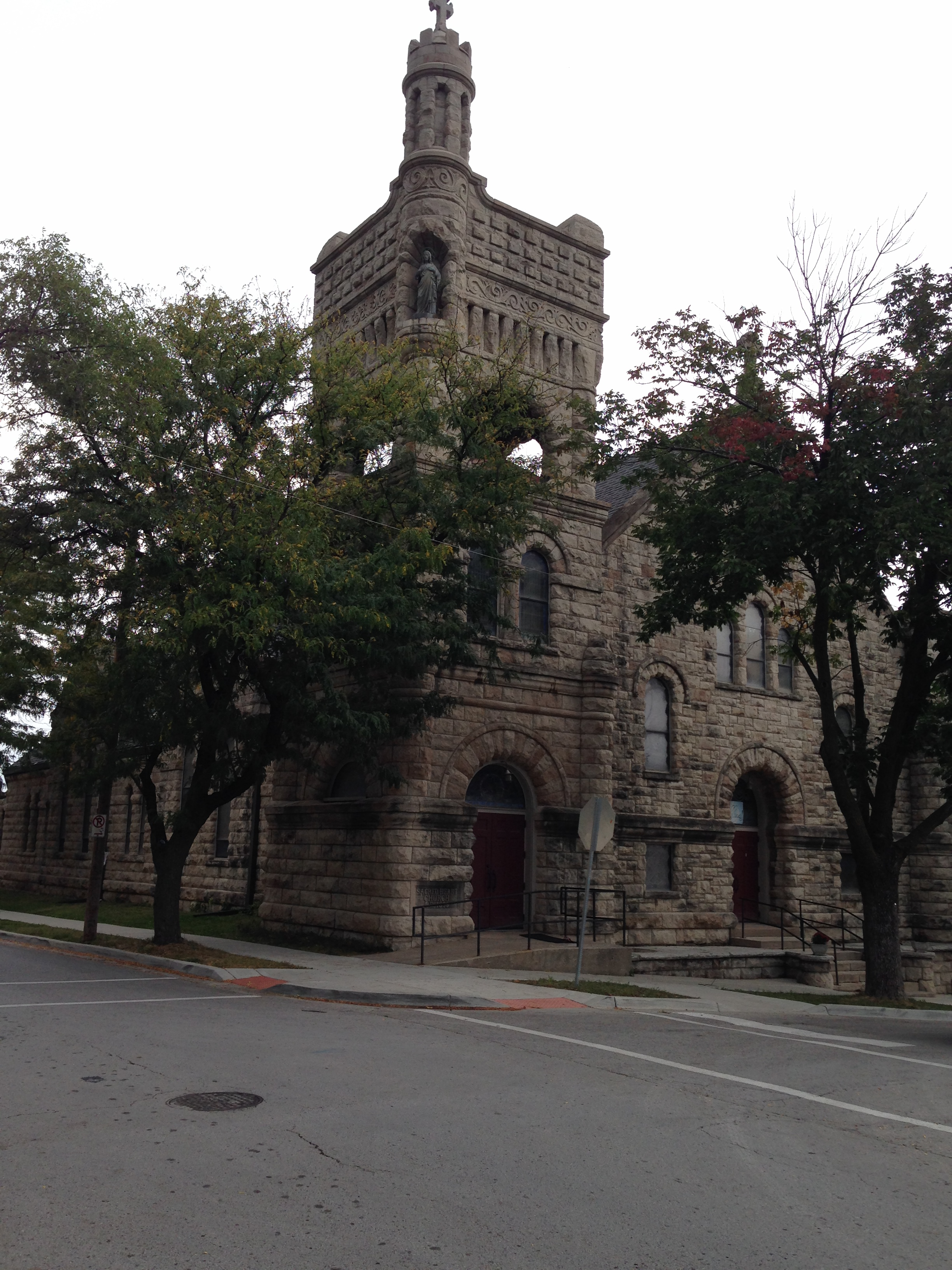
- Sacred Heart Church, Kansas City, MO

- Location within Missouri Location within the United States
- Location: 2544 Madison Ave., Kansas City, Missouri
- Coordinates: 39.080556°N 94.595556°W
- Area: 101 acres (41 ha)
- Built: 1896
- Architectural style: Second Empire, Queen Anne, Celtic-Norman
- NRHP reference No.: 78001659
- Added to NRHP: November 14, 1978

Sacred Heart Church, School and Rectory was a historic site at 2540–2544 Madison Avenue and 910 West 26th Street in Kansas City, Missouri. The church was built in 1896 and added to the National Register of Historic Places in 1978. The Rectory and School building were demolished in 2010 but the original church building and its parish hall remain.

The congregation is now known as Sacred Heart Guadalupe due to its merger with Our Lady of Guadalupe Church in 1991

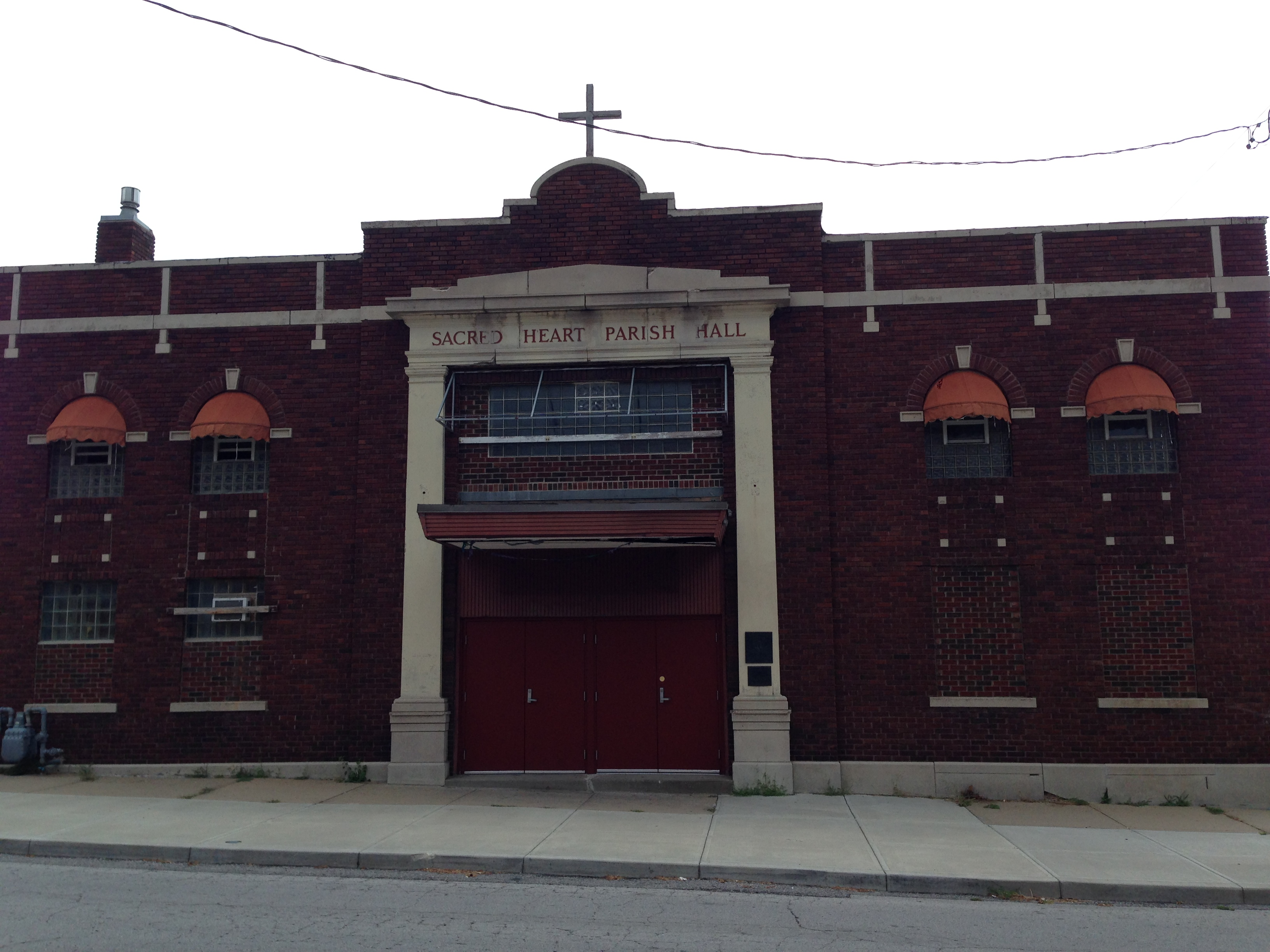
Photograph of the Sacred Heart Parish Hall Building on 26th street, Kansas City, Missouri
