= National Garage =

- U.S. National Register of Historic Places
- Location within Missouri Location within the United States
- Location: 1100-1110 McGee St., Kansas City, Missouri
- Coordinates: 39°6′12″N 94°34′47″W
- Area: less than one acre
- Built: 1930
- Architect: McIntyre, Georg; Pratti, S., Construnction Dommon
- Architectural style: Art Deco
- NRHP reference No.: 00000436
- Added to NRHP: May 05, 2000

The National Garage in Kansas City, Missouri is a building from 1930. It was listed on the National Register of Historic Places in 2000. It was demolished in 2004.
