= Crossroads, Kansas City =

Neighborhood and district of Kansas City, Missouri

Coordinates: 39°05′30″N 94°34′55″W

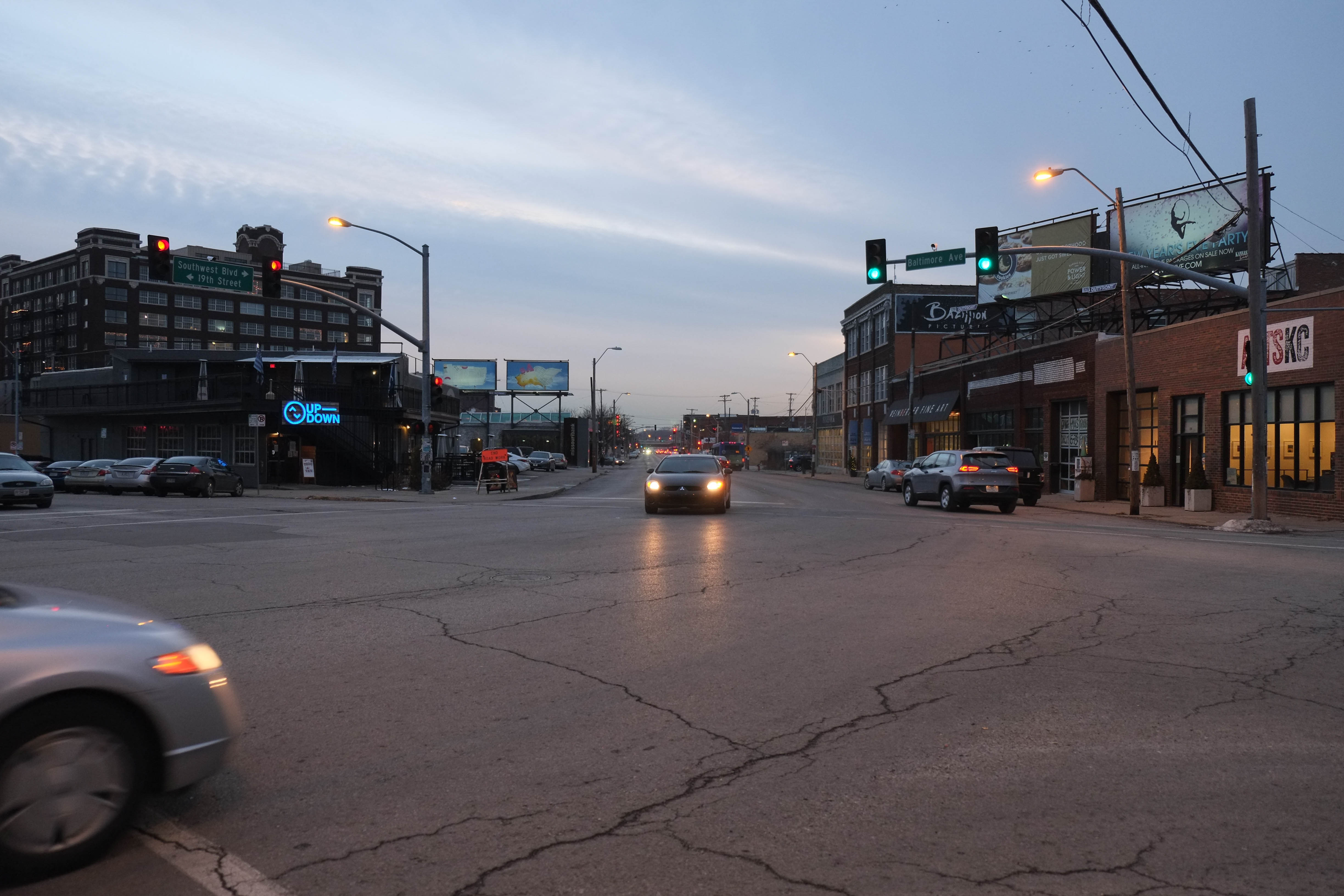
Crossroads, Kansas City in December 2016.

The Crossroads, officially the Crossroads Arts District, is a neighborhood within the Greater Downtown area of Kansas City, Missouri, with a population of 10,179. It is centered at approximately 19th Street and Baltimore Avenue, directly south of the Downtown Loop and north of Crown Center. It is the city's main art gallery district and center for the visual arts. Dozens of galleries are located in its renovated warehouses and industrial buildings. It is also home to numerous restaurants, housewares shops, architects, designers, an advertising agency, and other visual artists. The district also has several live music venues.

The district has become known for being home to many craft breweries. An area of the Crossroads is known as "Brewer's Alley" because of the high concentration of breweries all within walking distance.

Numerous buildings in the neighborhood are listed on the National Register of Historic Places, including the TWA Corporate Headquarters Building, Western Auto Building, and Firestone Building. There are two historic groups of buildings also on the Register—Work Class Hotels at 19th & Main Streets (consisting of the Midwest Hotel, Monroe Hotel, and Rieger Hotel) and Crossroads Historic Freight District (industrial buildings clustered along the tracks north of Union Station).

The Crossroads district is also home to one of the county's largest remaining examples of a Film Row district. The Film Row district consists of 17 buildings. Following the demolition of a Film Row building, the Film Row district was placed on Missouri Preservation's 2013 list of "watched properties".

The Kansas City Star and The Pitch maintain offices in the neighborhood, along with HOK and Barkley. The Belger Arts Center is also located in the district.

== Crossroads Music Festival ==
First held in late August 2005, the Crossroads Music Festival is an annual event organized by Spice of Life Productions, which features local music artists. The 2005 event was held at Grinder's Sculpture Park (Crossroads KC) at 18th Street and Locust Street. In addition to concert performances, offerings include short films by local independent filmmakers and booths offering apparel by local designers, local independent print media, and carnival games.

== Tax abatements ==
The Crossroads Arts PIEA is a tax abatement program in the Crossroads Arts District specifically designed for properties with arts and cultural uses, including:

- spaces used by independent artists, writers and performers;
- art dealers and art galleries;
- performing arts organizations; and promoters;
- fine arts schools;
- motion picture and video industries;
- sound recording industries;
- museum, historical sites, and similar institutions; and
- other arts uses as approved by the Crossroads Arts Advisory Committee.

In 2006 as the Crossroads began to flourish and prices increase, the Crossroads Community Association recognized the need to save their creative artistic neighborhood. Meetings were scheduled with the Mayor, City Council and the Economic Development Corporation of Kansas City to establish the Planned Industrial Expansion Authority (PIEA) which ensures the continued affordability of the community for artists for years to come. The General Development Plan for the Crossroads Arts PIEA was approved by City Council of Kansas City, Missouri on March 29, 2007, via City Ordinance NO. 070192. The General Development Plan (GDP) was revised by the PIEA Board on April 21, 2009, to reflect a change in staffing for the Arts PIEA from the EDC to the PIEA. Arts uses for properties must occupy at least 51% of the square footage of the property in order to be eligible for the program.

Out of a total of 668 property parcels in the Crossroads in 2007, there are 36 properties (5.4% of the total) participating in the program as of January 2015.

== See also ==
- List of neighborhoods in Kansas City, Missouri
- List of points of interest in Kansas City, Missouri
- North Village Arts District
