= Midwest Hotel =

- U.S. National Register of Historic Places
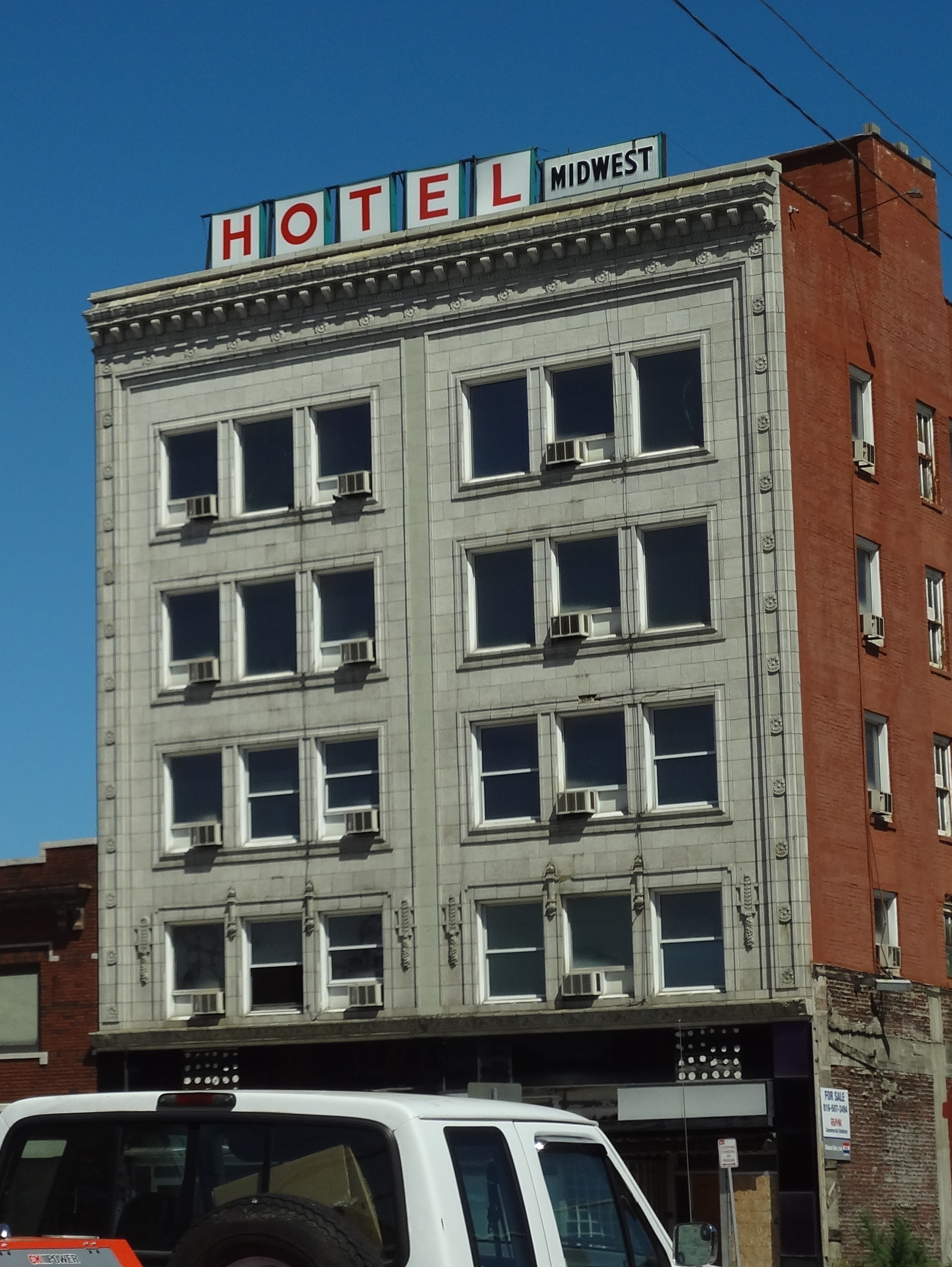
- Building in August 2011

- Location within Missouri Location within the United States
- Location: 1925 Main St., Kansas City, Missouri
- Coordinates: 39°5′29″N 94°35′0″W
- Area: less than one acre
- Built: 1915
- Architect: Smith, Rea and Lovitt; Aiken and Thayer
- Architectural style: Early Commercial
- MPS: Working Class Hotels at 19th and Main Streets, Kansas City, Missouri MPS
- NRHP reference No.: 04000394
- Added to NRHP: May 06, 2004

The Midwest Hotel is a hotel located in Kansas City, Missouri. The hotel is a building dating from 1915, and is located in the Crossroads Arts District. It has been listed on the National Register of Historic Places since 2004.

== Filming location ==
The hotel, in 1991, was the setting for exterior shots in the Ministry music video for Just One Fix. The music video focused on heavy opiate drug use and featured author William S. Burroughs as guest vocalist. The song was released on the band's 1992 album entitled Psalm 69 and has remained one of the most popular tracks the band has ever produced.
