= Inter-State Building =

- U.S. National Register of Historic Places
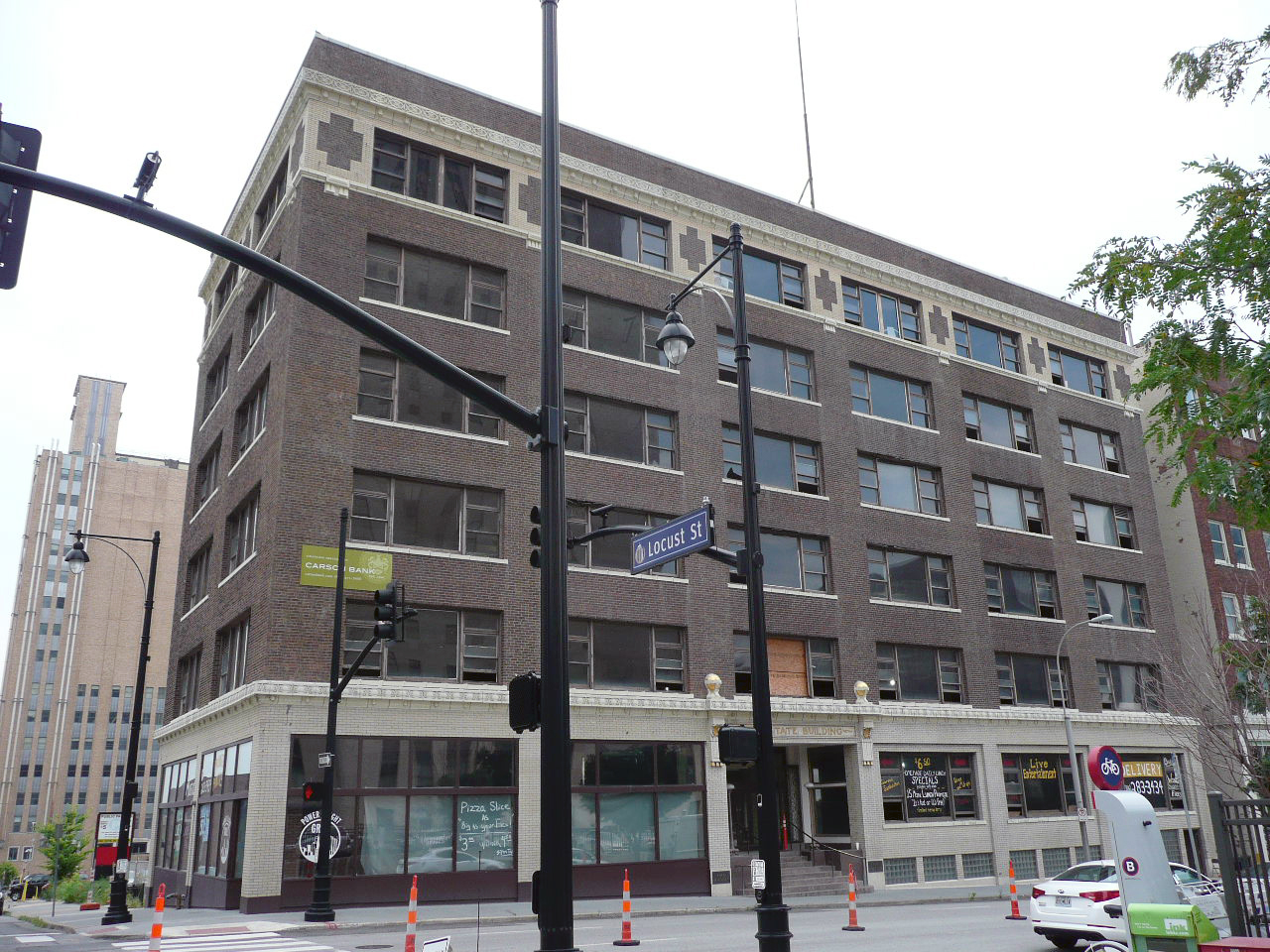
- Inter-State Building in 2015

- Location within Missouri Location within the United States
- Location: 417 E. 13th St./1300 Locust St., Kansas City, Missouri
- Coordinates: 39.09831°N 94.57779°W
- Built: 1914-15
- Built by: Stivers, Harvey
- Architect: Sunderland, James C.
- Architectural style: Chicago
- NRHP reference No.: 08000534
- Added to NRHP: June 12, 2008

The Inter-State Building is a six-story commercial building in the central business district of Kansas City, Missouri, that was built during 1914–15. It was listed on the National Register of Historic Places in 2008.

It was designed by Kansas City, Missouri, architect James C. Sunderland in Chicago style. It is made of reinforced concrete and is 50 feet (15 m) by 132 feet (40 m).
