= Rieger Hotel =

- U.S. National Register of Historic Places
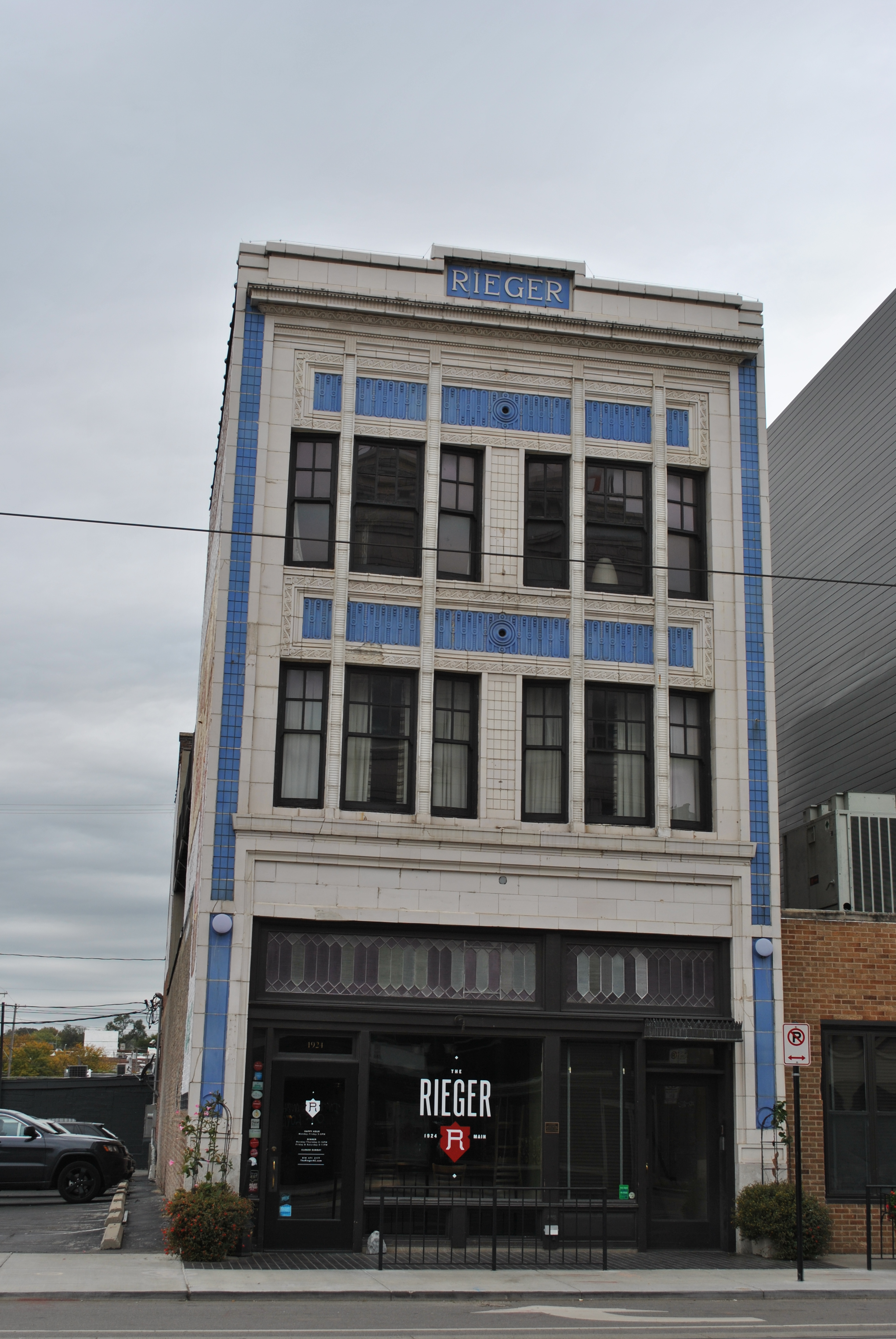

- Location within Missouri Location within the United States
- Location: 1922 Main St., Kansas City, Missouri
- Coordinates: 39°5′29″N 94°35′3″W
- Area: less than one acre
- Built: 1915
- Built by: Gray Construction Co.
- Architect: Smith, Rea and Lovitt
- Architectural style: Early Commercial
- MPS: Working Class Hotels at 19th and Main Streets, Kansas City, Missouri MPS
- NRHP reference No.: 04000396
- Added to NRHP: May 6, 2004

The Rieger Hotel in Kansas City, Missouri is a former hotel that was erected in 1915. It was listed on the National Register of Historic Places in 2004.

One of the most recognizable buildings in Kansas City's Crossroads Art District. On the northwest corner of 20th and Main Street, the Rieger Hotel was built by local entrepreneur Alexander Rieger. The hotel was originally utilized for traveling businessmen but was also known to host Al Capone when he would stay in Kansas City due to the building's proximity to Kansas City's Union Station which made for quick escapes.

Today, the original lobby hosts a restaurant, The Rieger Hotel Grill & Exchange. The basement is utilized by a speakeasy-styled bar.

While the hotel was sold by the Rieger family in 1926, it has maintained its name and historical value throughout the years. In 2003, the upper floors of the building were converted into condominiums.
