= District I (Hotels in Downtown Kansas City TR) =

- U.S. National Register of Historic Places
- U.S. Historic district
- Location within Missouri Location within the United States
- Location: Roughly bounded by Baltimore Ave., W. 12th, W. 13th, and Wyandotte Sts., Kansas City, Missouri
- Coordinates: 39°5′59″N 94°35′4″W
- Architect: Multiple
- Architectural style: Mixed (more Than 2 Styles From Different Periods)
- MPS: Hotels in Downtown Kansas City TR
- NRHP reference No.: 83001000
- Added to NRHP: August 8, 1983

District I is the name of a historic district comprising five historic hotels in downtown Kansas City, Missouri listed on the National Register of Historic Places (NRHP) in 1983.

The district's five hotels are

- Dixon Hotel (1912), designed by Sanneman & Van Trump
- Aladdin Hotel, known in 1983 as Embassy on the Park, a 16-story building
- Hotel Muehlebach (1915), known in 1983 as Radisson Muehlebach Hotel
- New Yorker Hotel
- Hotel Phillips

In addition to the district, two other hotels were individually listed on the National Register at the same time:

- Continental Hotel (1923), 106 West 11th Street, a 23-story building that was built as Kansas City Athletic Club. Known also as Hotel Kansas Citian.
- President Hotel
