= Ridenour-Baker Grocery Company Building =

- U.S. National Register of Historic Places
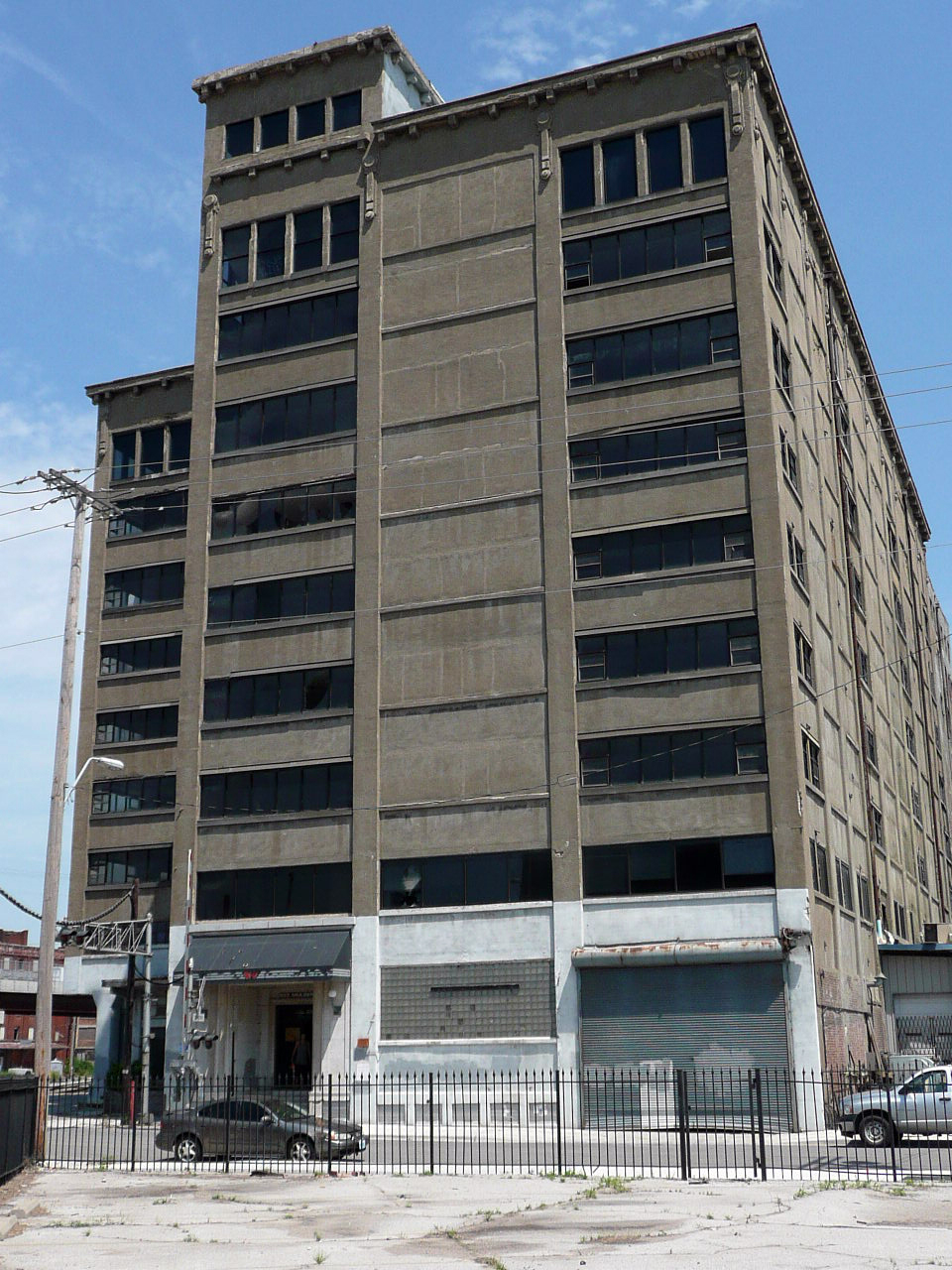

- Location within Missouri Location within the United States
- Location: 933 Mulberry St., Kansas City, Missouri
- Coordinates: 39.103157°N 94.599432°W
- Built: 1910
- NRHP reference No.: 14000161
- Added to NRHP: April 21, 2014

The Ridenour-Baker Grocery Company Building in Kansas City, Missouri was a commercial building constructed in 1910 by the Ridenour-Baker Grocery Company. It was the first wholesale grocery building west of the Mississippi River to be located on the path of a railway, where goods could be shipped into it directly. The building was listed on the National Register of Historic Places in 2014.

== Early history ==
In 1858, Peter Ridenour and Harlow Baker established the Ridenour-Baker Grocery Company in Lawrence, Kansas, but the development of the railroad system and the conjunction of several key railway lines along the Missouri River drew them to the West Bottoms neighborhood of Kansas City, Missouri, where they relocated and built their first company building in 1878. The location gave the company the advantage of having goods shipped directly to it from passing trains; it was the first wholesale grocery building west of the Mississippi River to be situated in this way, and soon after, all four of Ridenour and Baker's grocery competitors in Kansas City relocated their warehouses to also be near railways.

In 1903, flood waters submerged much of the West Bottoms, damaging the original building, and construction on a new building began in 1910. In 1914, in response to a fire that swept through the complex, Ridenour and Baker chose to reconstruct the 1910 company building using fireproof reinforced concrete (at the time, a new state-of-the-art construction material) rather than brick. In addition to storing goods, the building served as the production line for Ridenour-Baker's own brand of goods–coffee, spices, peanuts, and other goods–under the label "F.F.O.G" ("First Fruit of the Garden," or, during World War I, "First Finance Our Government").

The construction of Kansas City Union Station in a more central part of the city in 1914 shifted the focus of the local railway lines away from the West Bottoms, and the rise of new Midwestern supply centers in other states after World War I eroded Kansas City's primacy in the warehouse storage and wholesale market. The postwar decline in business caused the Ridenour-Baker Grocery Company to dissolve in 1936.

== Weld Wheel ==
In 1978, the building was occupied by Weld Wheel Industries, a Kansas City manufacturer of wheels for racing cars founded by race car driver Greg Weld. By the early 2000s, Weld Wheel had outgrown the space, which was not suitable for manufacturing, and the company relocated to a new facility in 2003, leaving the building vacant.

== Residential development plans ==
In 2013, real estate developer Wayne Reeder purchased the property and, in 2015, received approval for a plan to turn the building into residential lofts.

In April 2023, the Kansas City development board approved plans to demolish the building after which the first phase of New York-based developer SomeraRoad’s plans to revamp more than 20 acres in the area

In March 2024, demolition began on the building. Demolition was completed on May 19 with the implosion of the main building.
