= Graphic Arts Building (Kansas City, Missouri) =

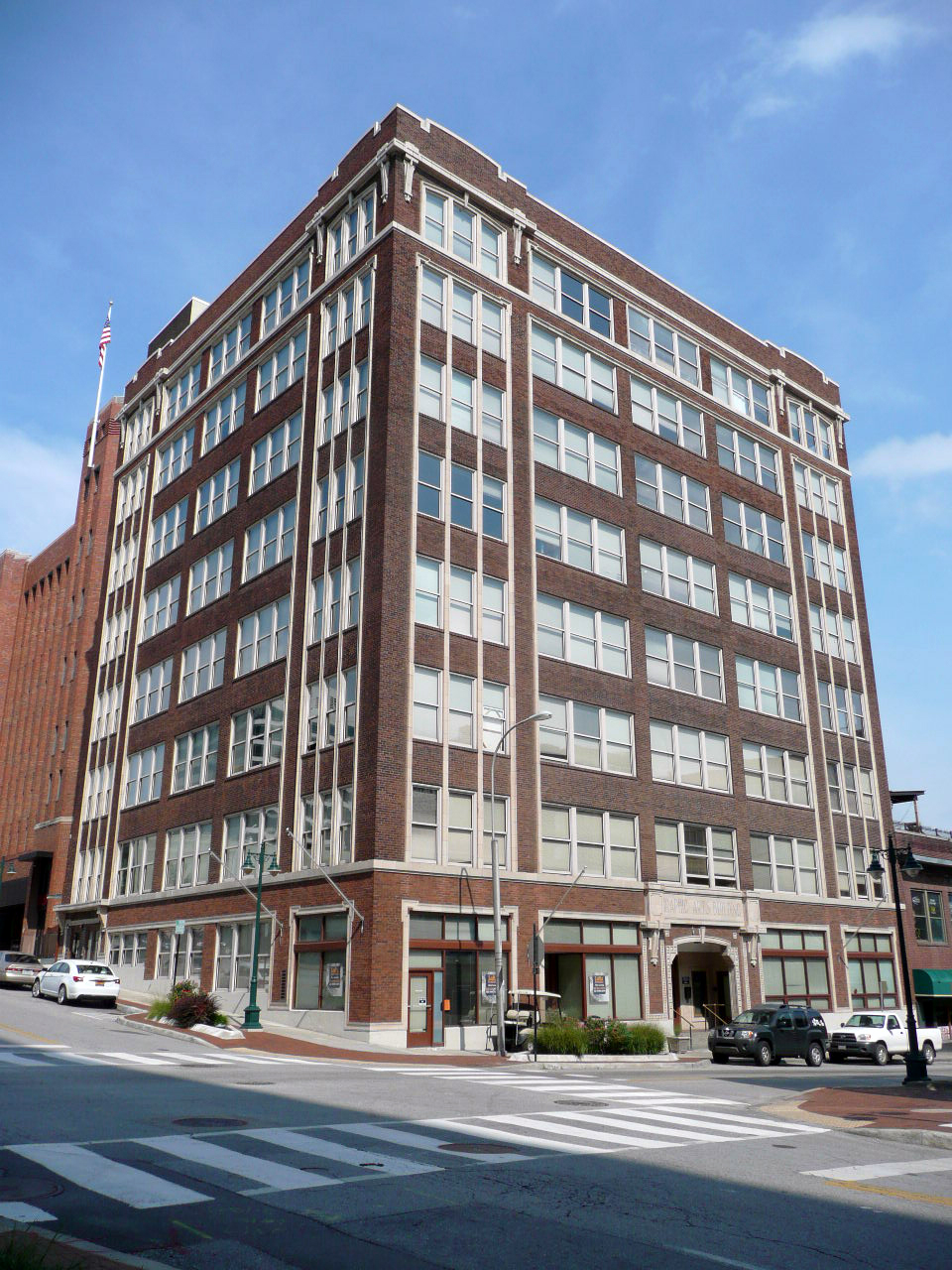
- Interactive map of the Graphic Arts Building area

General information
- Status: Completed
- Type: Residential apartments
- Location: 934 Wyandotte, Kansas City, Missouri
- Completed: 1915
- Cost: $150,000
- Renovation cost: $11,054,408
- Owner: Embassy Properties

Technical details
- Floor count: 8
- Floor area: 84,590 sq ft (7,859 m^{2})
- Lifts/elevators: 2; 1 in use

Design and construction
- Architect: Samuel B. Tarbet
- yes
- Graphic Arts Building
- U.S. National Register of Historic Places
- Location within Missouri Location within the United States
- Location: 934 Wyandotte St., Kansas City, Missouri
- Coordinates: 39°6′16″N 94°35′5″W
- Built: 1915
- Architect: Tarbet, Samuel B.; Pratt and Thompson Construction Co.
- Architectural style: Early Commercial
- NRHP reference No.: 05000810
- Added to NRHP: August 04, 2005

The Graphic Arts Building in downtown Kansas City, Missouri, USA, is an eight-story, 58 unit, reinforced concrete building. Following an approval in 2005 for redevelopment, it currently houses the Graphic Arts Lofts (formerly Park University).

The building was built in 1915 as a headquarters for commercial printing and related trades.

The building's architect, Samuel B. Tarbet, also built other local commercial buildings such as the Wheeling Corrugating Company Building, the Goodenow Textiles Company Building, Kansas City Athenaeum, J. D. Bowerstock Theater (now known as Liberty Hall) and Olathe City Hall. Additionally, he built residences for H. F. Hill, C.F. Myers and Dr. Guffey.

The first floor houses the leasing office for Old Town Lofts buildings.

In 2005, it was added to the National Register of Historic Places.
