= Boillat =

Boillat is a surname. Notable people with the surname include:

- Laurent Boillat (1911–1985), Swiss sculptor and engraver
- Marcel Boillat (1929–2020), Swiss political activist

== See also ==
- Boillot
