= Lauck =

Lauck is a surname. Notable people with the surname include:

- Chester Lauck (1902–1980), American radio and film actor
- Gary Lauck (born 1953), American neo-Nazi activist and publisher
- Gerd Lauck (1931–2005), German footballer
- Hans-Joachim Lauck (born 1937), Minister for Heavy Plant and Machinery Construction in the German Democratic Republic
- Jennifer Lauck (born 1963), American author, essayist, speaker and writing instructor
- Manuel Lauck (born 1983), German racing driver
- M. Hannah Lauck (born 1963), American judge
- Reinhard Lauck (1946–1997), German footballer
- Trevor Lauck (born 2004), American football player

See also

- Boillot & Lauck, was a long term architectural partnership between Elmer R. Boillot and Jesse F. Lauck in Kansas City, Missouri
