= Boillot =

Boillot is a surname. Notable people with the surname include:

- André Boillot ( 1891–1932), French auto racing driver
- Georges Boillot (1884–1916), French Grand Prix motor racing driver and World War I fighter pilot

== See also ==
- Boillot & Lauck, US architectural partnership and business duo
