= Hotel Phillips =

- U.S. National Register of Historic Places
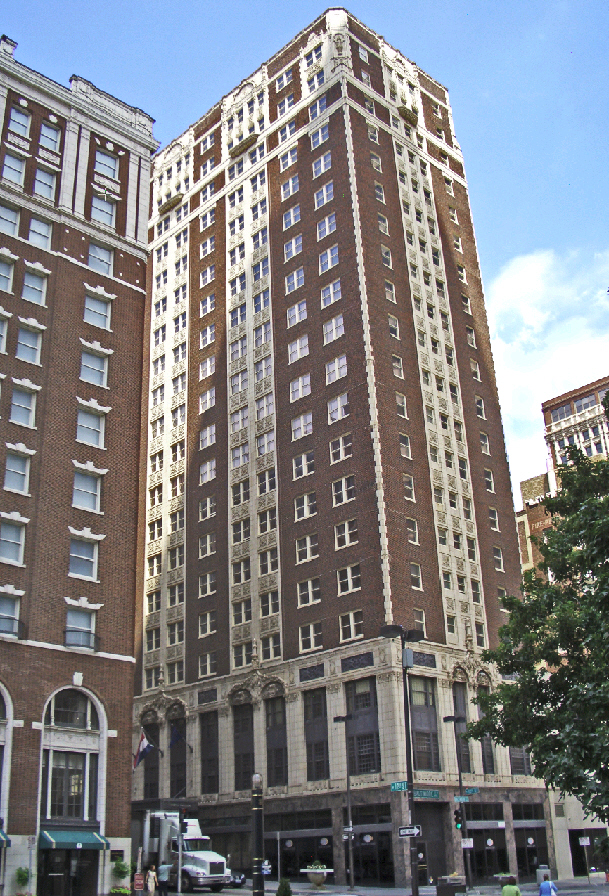
- Hotel Phillips, Kansas City, Missouri

- Location within Missouri Location within the United States
- Location: 106 W. 12th St., Kansas City, Missouri
- Coordinates: 39°6′1″N 94°35′3″W
- Area: less than one acre
- Built: 1931; 95 years ago
- Architect: Boillot & Lauck (Elmer R. Boillot and Jesse F. Lauck)
- Architectural style: Jacobean
- Website: https://www.hilton.com/en/hotels/mkccuqq-hotel-phillips-kansas-city/
- NRHP reference No.: 79001369
- Added to NRHP: 4 June 1979

The Hotel Phillips, a historic 217-room hotel located on 12th Street in downtown Kansas City, Missouri, opened in 1931.

The site was formerly occupied by the Glennon Hotel, in which Harry S. Truman operated a haberdashery shop. That hotel was demolished, and the Phillips was constructed at a cost of $1.6 million, opening in February 1931. The 450-room hotel was then the tallest in Kansas City, at 20 stories. It is directly across from the historic Muehlebach Hotel.

The Phillips was listed on the National Register of Historic Places in 1979. It operated in the 1990s as the Radisson Suite Hotel Kansas City. It was bought by Marcus Hotels in 2001 from Wyndham Hotels.

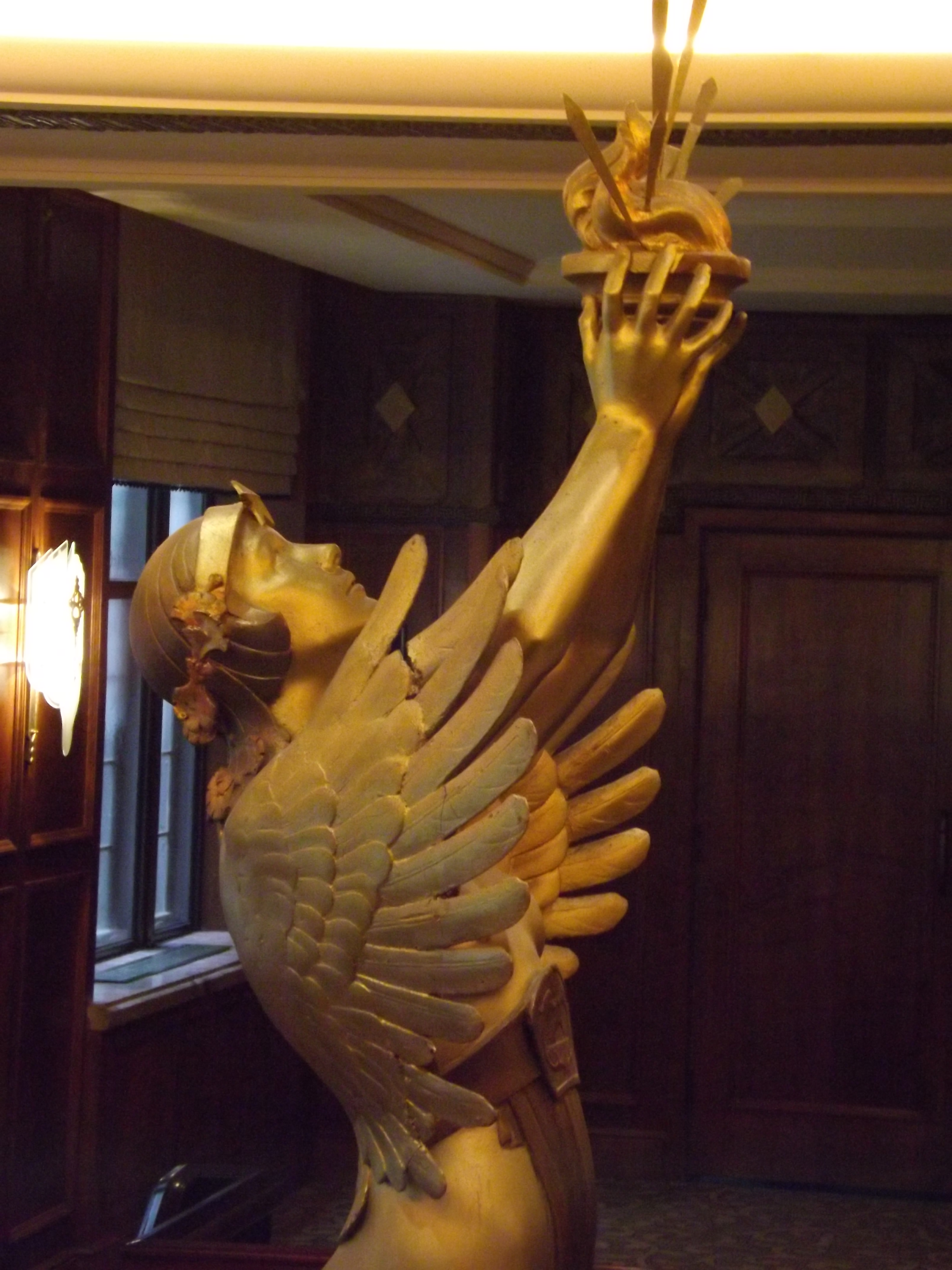
Goddess of Dawn

The lobby contains an eleven-foot sculpture of the Goddess of Dawn, created in 1931 by Kansas City sculptor Jorgen Dreyer.

In October 2015, it was announced that The Phillips was purchased by Arbor Lodging Partners. The Phillips was renovated and joined the Curio Collection by Hilton.
