= Jensen-Salsbery Laboratories =

- U.S. National Register of Historic Places
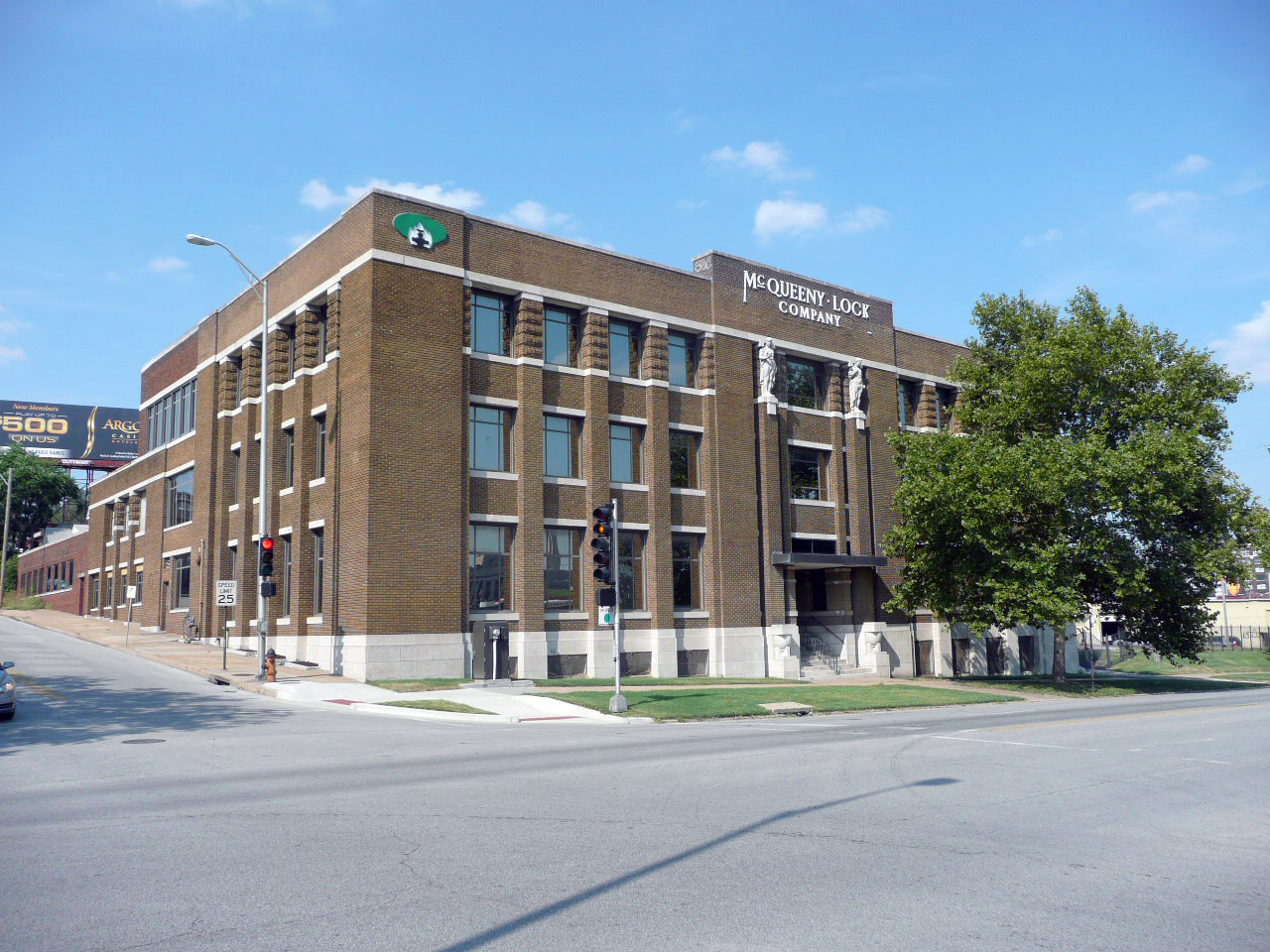

- Location within Missouri Location within the United States
- Location: 520 W. Pennway St., Kansas City, Missouri
- Coordinates: 39°5′16″N 94°35′27″W
- Area: less than one acre
- Built: 1918
- Architect: Brostrom, Ernest O.
- Architectural style: Prairie School
- NRHP reference No.: 85001574
- Added to NRHP: July 16, 1985

The Jensen-Salsbery Laboratories building in Kansas City, Missouri is a building from 1918. It was listed on the National Register of Historic Places in 1985. Two Atlas sculptures representing Biology and Chemistry were created by Kansas City sculptor Jorgen Dreyer in 1918 on the third floor above the entry doors.
