= Laurent Boillat =

Swiss sculptor

- Born: 17 April 1911; Tramelan, Canton of Bern, Switzerland
- Died: 11 March 1985 (aged 73); Delémont, Canton of Jura, Switzerland
- Occupations: Sculptor, engraver

Laurent Boillat (17 April 1911 – 11 March 1985) was a sculptor and engraver. He was one of the founders of the Société des peintres et sculpteurs jurassiens (Society of Jura Painters and Sculptors, SPSJ).

== Notable exhibitions ==
In 2005, an exhibition of Boillat's work was organized by the Musée jurassien d'art et d'histoire (Jura Museum of Art and History) at Delémont.
