= Marcel Boillat =

Swiss politician (1929–2020)

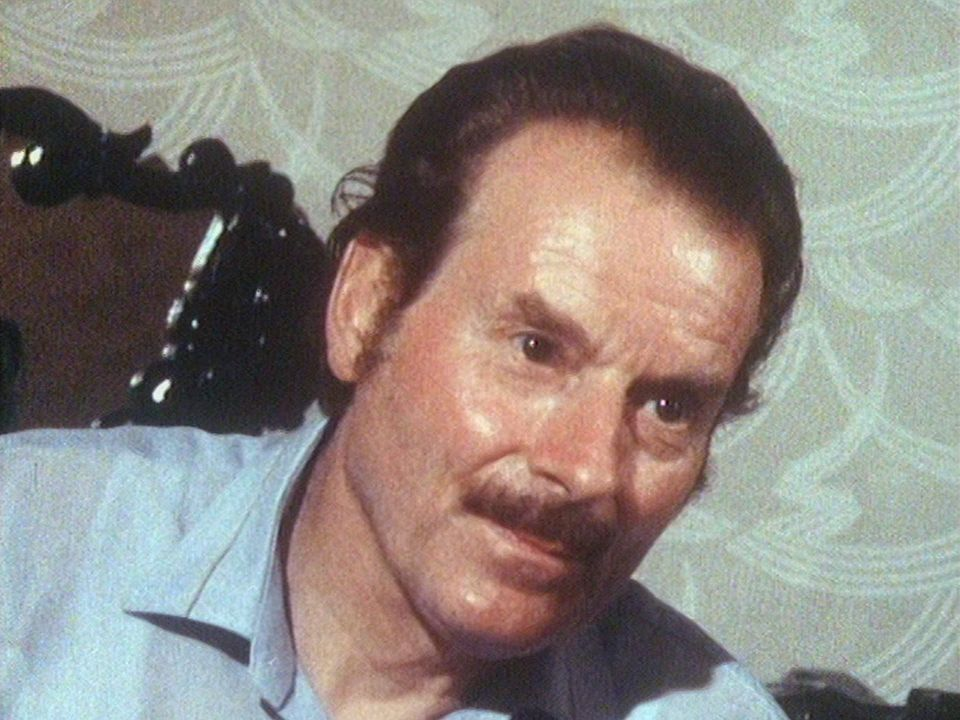
- Born: 5 August 1929; Courtételle, Switzerland
- Died: 6 April 2020 (aged 90); Ciudad Real, Spain
- Occupation: Political Activist

Marcel Boillat (5 August 1929 – 6 April 2020) was a Swiss political activist and a member of the Front de libération du Jura, a Jurassic separatism group.

== Biography ==
Born into a bourgeois family, Boillat was educated at the Collège Saint-Charles in Porrentruy and Collège Maria-Hilf in Schwytz. He then attended the École supérieure de commerce de Neuchâtel, graduating in 1949.

After his education, Boillat joined his father and half-brother in their wine business, Les grandsons de Marcelin Boillat. He then moved to a farm in Sornetan in August 1963.

In 1962, alongside Jean-Marie Joset, he founded the Front de libération du Jura (FLJ). The movement set fire to two farms, vandalized road signs, and stole from isolated military buildings. He was arrested with Joset on 25 March 1964, and was sentenced to eight years in prison. His businesses then went bankrupt.

On 18 February 1967, Boillat escaped from the penitentiary in Crêtelongue, and fled through France into Spain. He was imprisoned on 9 June, but then released on 19 September on refugee status, after Francisco Franco refused to extradite him. Franco described Boillat as the "first Swiss political refugee".

In 1968, Boillat divorced his first wife and married a Spanish woman in 1970. Together, they settled in Daimiel, south of Madrid, where he worked in construction. In 1977, he became chief of staff for a food business.

After retirement, Boillat dedicated himself to painting. He returned to Switzerland in 1987.

Marcel Boillat died on 6 April 2020 at the age of 90 in Ciudad Real, Spain. He was buried the next day in Daimiel.
