= Boillot & Lauck =

American architectural team

Boillot and Lauck was a long term architectural partnership between Elmer R. Boillot and Jesse Fay Lauck (died September 28, 1968) in Kansas City, Missouri. Their work includes properties listed on the National Register of Historic Places.

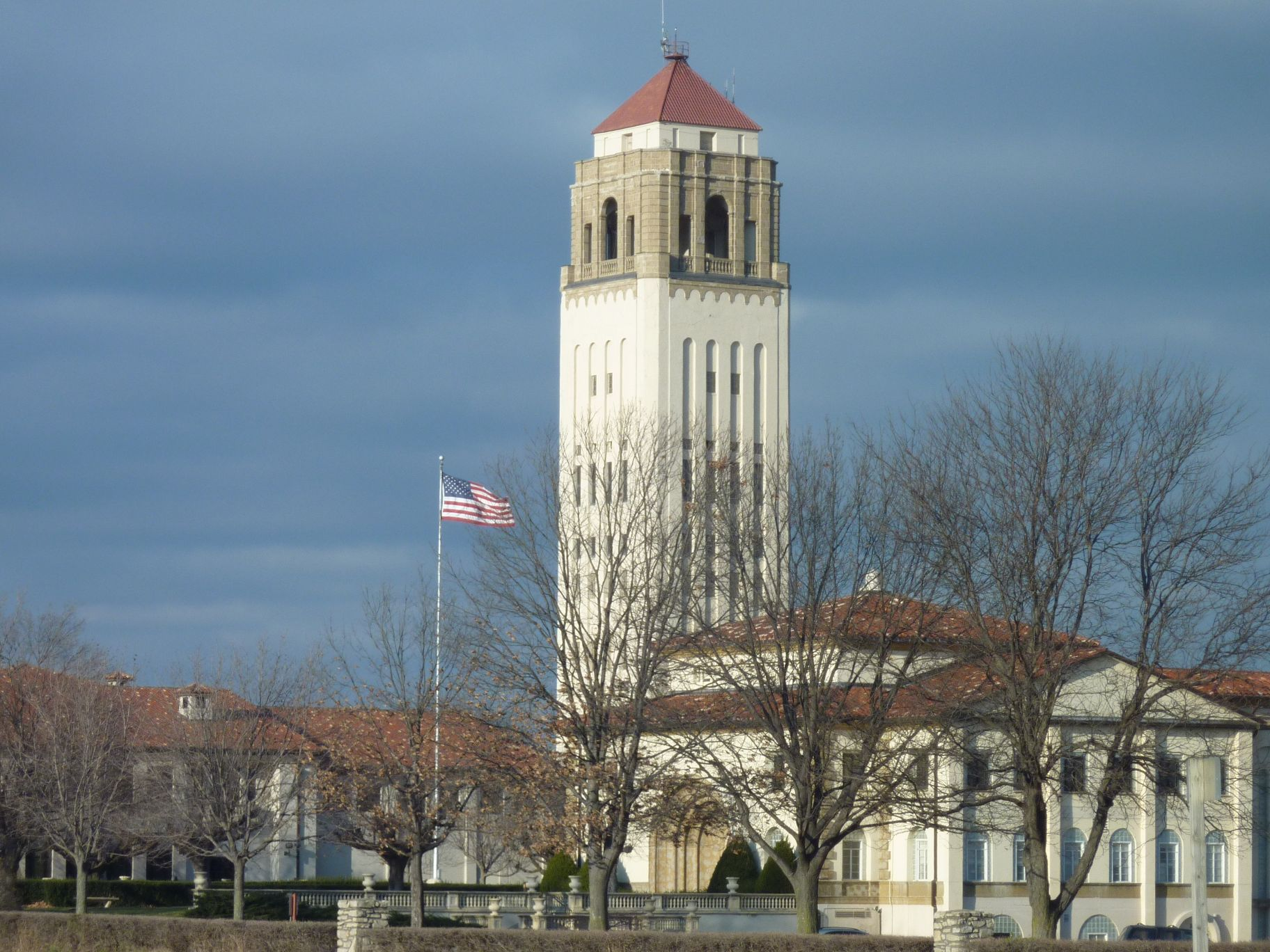
Photo of Unity Church buildings including the 150-foot-high Unity Tower

The firm focused mainly on residential properties in its early years and expanded into apartment buildings. Boillot and Lauck designed 23 homes in the Coleman Highlands neighborhood. They also designed the Parriott House for oilman Foster Brooks Parriott in Tulsa, Oklahoma.

The firm was chief architect for Sedalia Air Force Base near Knob Noster, Missouri.

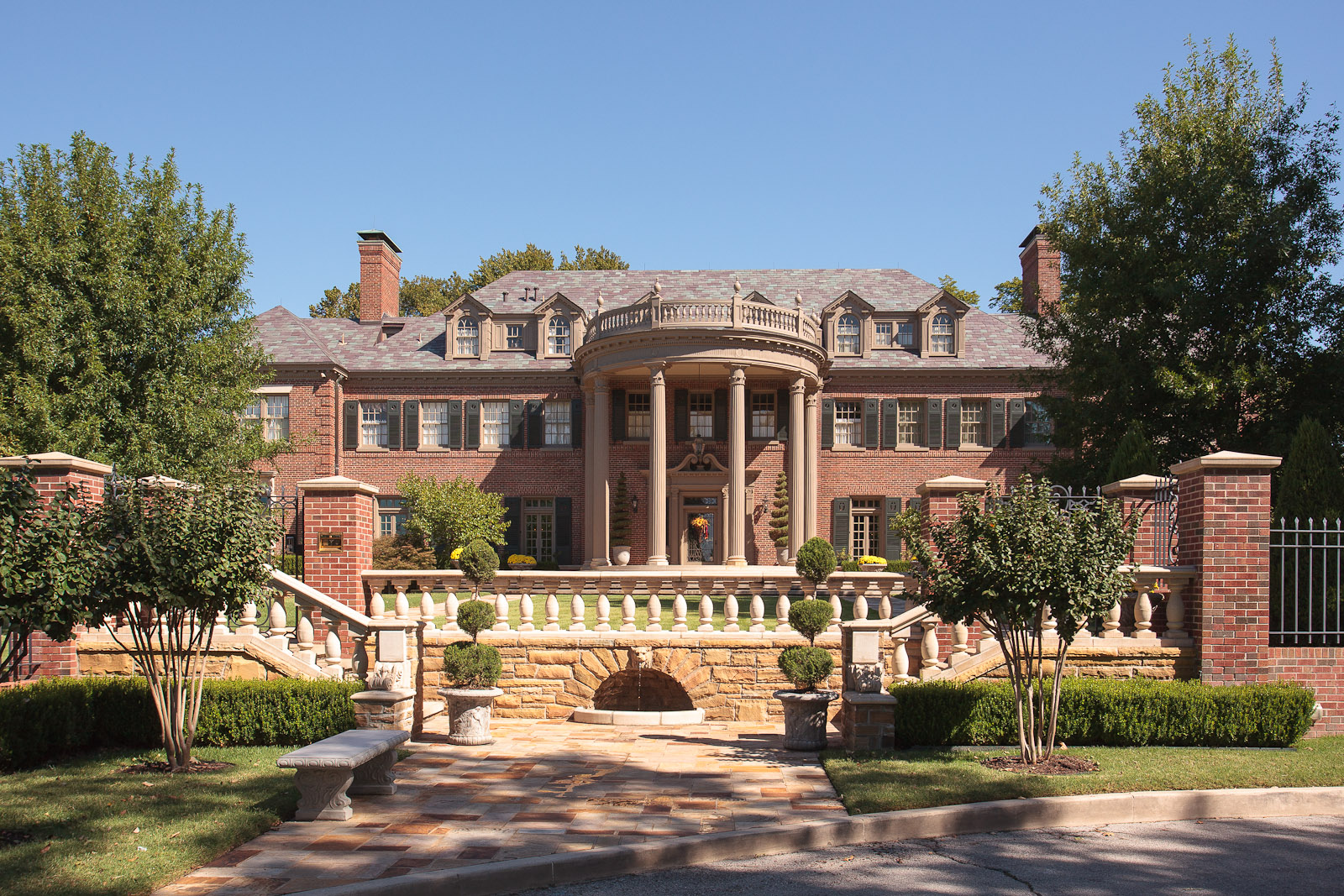
Foster B. Parriott House in Tulsa

Lauck continued with his own firm after Boillot's retirement.

Architectural historian Tom Taylor gave a talk about the firm in 2016.

== Work ==
- Hotel Phillips (1931), 106 W. 12th St. Kansas City, NRHP listed. Boillot, Elmer R.
- One or more contributing properties in the Park Manor Historic District, 910 Ward Pkwy, 920 Ward Pkwy. and 4826 Roanoke Pkwy Kansas City Boillot and Lauck
- Foster B. Parriott House (built 1929-1930), 2216 E. 30th St., a Neoclassical mansion in Tulsa, Oklahoma, NRHP listed. Boillot and Lauck
- One or more buildings in the Unity School of Christianity Historic District (Unity Church) including Unity Tower and the Silent Unity buildings, Jct. US 50 and Colborn Rd. Unity Village, Missouri Boillot, Elmer and Lauck, Jesse F
- The Walnuts apartments

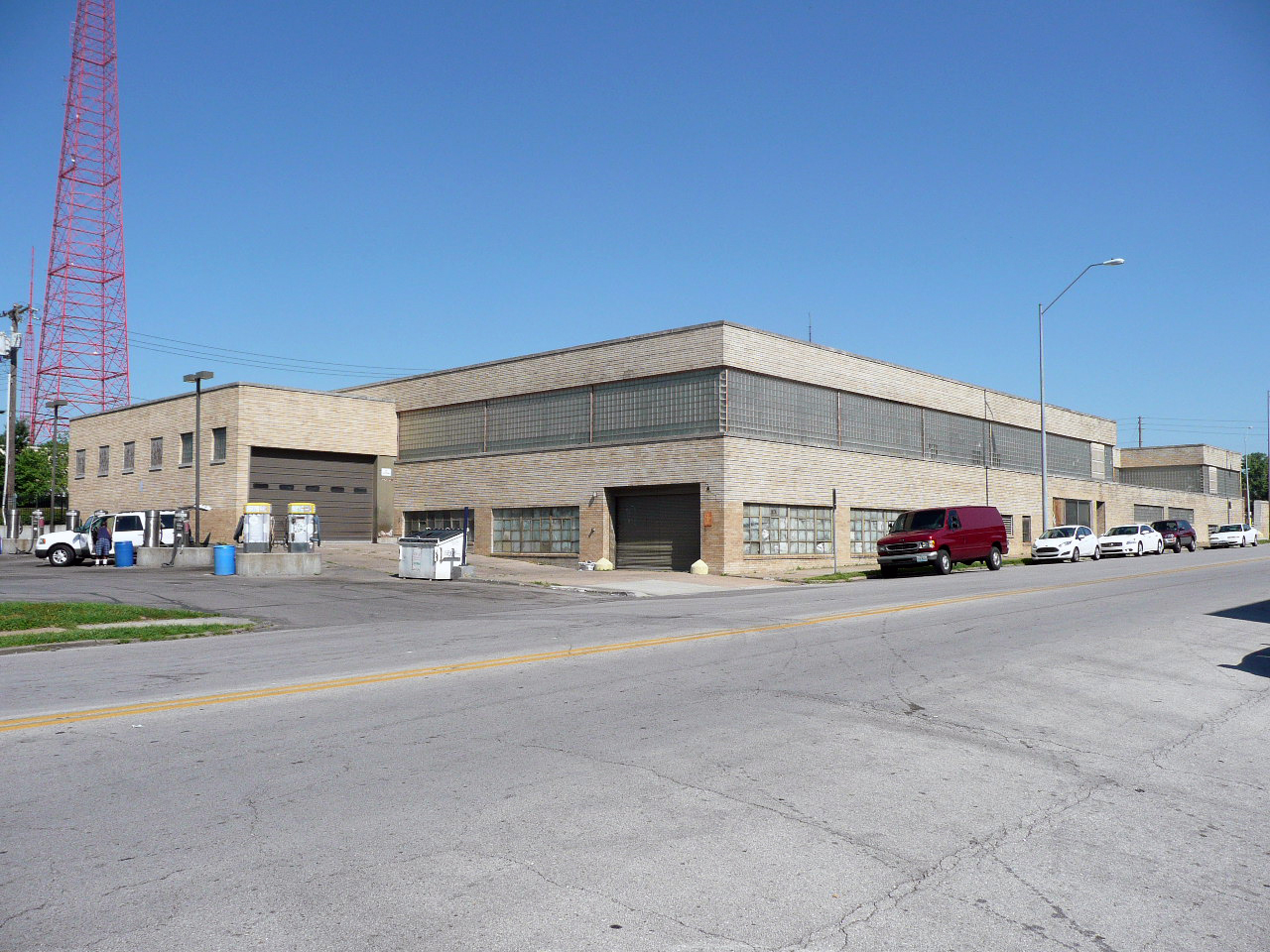
Aines Farm Dairy Building

- Aines Farm Dairy Building, 3110-30 Gillham Rd. Kansas City, MO Lauck, J.F. NRHP listed
