= National Register of Historic Places listings in Jackson County, Missouri: Kansas City other =

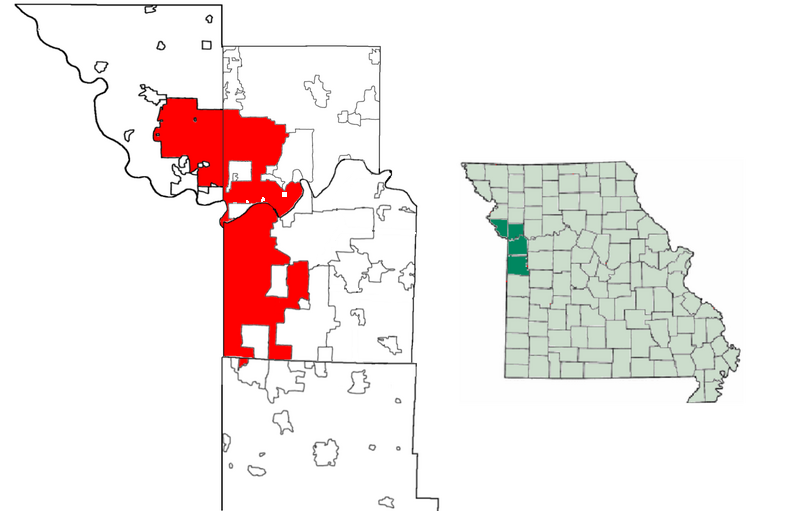
Map of Kansas City, Missouri

This is a list of the National Register of Historic Places listings in Kansas City, Missouri outside downtown.

This is intended to be a complete list of the properties and districts on the National Register of Historic Places in the Jackson County portions of Kansas City, Missouri, United States, outside downtown. Downtown Kansas City is defined as being roughly bounded by the Missouri River to the north, 31st Street to the south, Troost Avenue to the east, and State Line Road to the west. The locations of National Register properties and districts may be seen in an online map.

There are 341 properties and districts listed on the National Register in Kansas City. The Jackson County portions outside downtown includes 186 of these properties and districts; the city's remaining properties and districts are listed elsewhere. One historic district overlaps both the downtown area and the area outside downtown.

This National Park Service list is complete through NPS recent listings posted November 6, 2026.

== Current listings ==
	Name on the Register	Image	Date listed	Location	Neighborhood	Description
1	18th and Vine Historic District	18th and Vine Historic District	September 9, 1991 (#84004142)	Roughly bounded by 18th St., Woodland Ave., 19th St., and The Paseo; 39°05′20″N 94°33′40″W	18th and Vine-Downtown East	part of the 18th and Vine Area of Kansas City Multiple Property Submission (MPS)
2	85th and Manchester "Three Trails" Trail Segment	85th and Manchester "Three Trails" Trail Segment	August 22, 2012 (#12000525)	Northwestern corner of the junction of 85th and Manchester; 38°58′13″N 94°29′55″W	Park Farms	part of the Santa Fe Trail MPS
3	A.B.C. Storage and Van Company Building	A.B.C. Storage and Van Company Building	February 1, 2007 (#06001334)	1015 E. 8th St. 39°06′14″N 94°34′13″W	Paseo West	
4	ABC Storage & Van Company Warehouse B	ABC Storage & Van Company Warehouse B	December 12, 2022 (#100008448)	3244 Main St. 39°04′03″N 94°35′08″W		
5	ACME Cleansing Company Building	ACME Cleansing Company Building	July 16, 2017 (#100001346)	3200 Gillham Rd. 39°04′07″N 94°34′41″W	North Hyde Park	
6	Agee Apartments Historic District	Agee Apartments Historic District	July 16, 2017 (#100001347)	3200-3218 Linwood Blvd. 39°04′05″N 94°32′44″W	Santa Fe	
7	Aines Farm Dairy Building	Aines Farm Dairy Building	October 1, 2008 (#08000960)	3110-30 Gillham Rd. 39°04′11″N 94°34′36″W	Hyde Park	
8	Ambassador Hotel Historic District		February 17, 1983 (#83000995)	3527 and 3600 Broadway and 435 and 441 Knickerbocker Pl.; also 336 W. 36th St. and 3543 Broadway; 39°03′45″N 94°35′25″W	Hanover Place, Valentine	Second set of addresses represents a boundary increase of April 10, 2008
9	Anderson Electric Car Company Building		December 12, 2022 (#100008447)	3240 Main St. 39°04′04″N 94°35′08″W		
10	Archbishop O'Hara High School	Archbishop O'Hara High School	February 1, 2021 (#100006074)	9001 James A. Reed Rd. 38°57′40″N 94°29′35″W		
11	Armour Boulevard Post-World War II Apartment Building Historic District		November 7, 2007 (#07001155)	640 and 701 E. Armour Boulevard and 3457 Holmes St. 39°03′49″N 94°34′34″W	Hyde Park	part of the Working-Class and Middle-Income Apartment Buildings in Kansas City, Missouri MPS
12	Attucks School	Attucks School	September 9, 1991 (#91001150)	1815 Woodland Ave. 39°05′25″N 94°33′37″W	Wendell Phillips	part of the 18th and Vine Area of Kansas City MPS
13	Aurora Apartments	Aurora Apartments	October 23, 2017 (#100001758)	3012-3014 Linwood Blvd. 39°04′04″N 94°32′52″W		
14	Bancroft Apartments		October 21, 2026 (#100013569)	4301 Troost Avenue; 39°02′55″N 94°34′21″W		
15	Bancroft School	Bancroft School	January 12, 2012 (#11001017)	4300 Tracy Ave. 39°02′54″N 94°34′14″W	Manheim Park	
16	Barclay Building	Barclay Building	February 8, 2007 (#07000042)	3613-23 Broadway Boulevard; 39°03′42″N 94°35′25″W	Hanover Place	
17	Bellefontaine Avenue Historic District	Bellefontaine Avenue Historic District	February 14, 2011 (#11000010)	500-24 Bellefontaine Ave. 39°06′27″N 94°32′50″W	Scarritt Point	
18	Bellerive Hotel	Bellerive Hotel	February 28, 1980 (#80002361)	214 E. Armour Boulevard; 39°03′50″N 94°34′59″W	Broadway Gillham	
19	Belmont Hotel	Belmont Hotel	August 4, 2016 (#16000513)	911 E. Linwood Blvd. 39°04′07″N 94°34′25″W	North Hyde Park	
20	Thomas Hart Benton House and Studio	Thomas Hart Benton House and Studio	November 21, 1980 (#80002362)	3616 Belleview St. 39°03′44″N 94°35′52″W	Roanoke	
21	Beth Shalom Synagogue	Beth Shalom Synagogue	September 9, 1982 (#82003142)	3400 The Paseo; 39°03′53″N 94°34′03″W	Center City	
22	Walter E. Bixby House	Walter E. Bixby House	November 21, 1978 (#78001651)	6505 State Line Rd. 39°00′37″N 94°36′26″W	Romanelli West	
23	Blenheim School	Blenheim School	July 16, 2017 (#100001348)	2411 E. 70th Terrace; 38°59′55″N 94°33′30″W	Blenheim Square-Research Hospital	
24	Bon Air Apartments Building	Bon Air Apartments Building	July 30, 2008 (#08000754)	4127–4133 Locust St. 39°03′06″N 94°34′49″W	Southmoreland	part of the Working-Class and Middle-Income Apartment Buildings in Kansas City, Missouri MPS
25	Charles A. Braley House	Charles A. Braley House	October 9, 2013 (#13000821)	3 Dunford Cir. 39°01′48″N 94°36′25″W	Kansas City	
26	Burnette-Berry House	Burnette-Berry House	February 18, 2011 (#11000023)	1030 W. 65th St. 39°00′38″N 94°36′07″W	Country Club District	
27	Byram's Ford Historic District	Byram's Ford Historic District	October 16, 1989 (#89001629)	63rd St. and Manchester Trafficway at the Big Blue River; 39°00′55″N 94°31′33″W	Kansas City	
28	Campbell-Continental Baking Company Building	Campbell-Continental Baking Company Building	May 10, 2016 (#16000235)	1108 E. 30th St. 39°04′21″N 94°34′15″W		Erroneously listed in Caldwell County.
29	Cave Spring		August 10, 1978 (#78001652)	7100 Blue Ridge Extension; 38°59′38″N 94°29′00″W	Park Farms	
30	Philip E. Chappell House	Philip E. Chappell House	August 3, 1990 (#90001157)	1836 Pendleton Ave. 39°06′47″N 94°33′30″W	Pendleton Heights	
31	Chatham Hotel	Chatham Hotel	June 24, 2008 (#08000564)	3701 Broadway; 39°03′36″N 94°35′25″W	Hanover Place	
32	Chicago Apartments	Chicago Apartments	September 11, 1980 (#80002363)	1110–1112 E. Armour Boulevard; 39°03′48″N 94°34′16″W	Center City	
33	Circle Apartments	Circle Apartments	October 22, 2002 (#02001199)	1200 Paseo Boulevard; 39°05′57″N 94°33′53″W	Paseo West	part of the Apartment Buildings on the North End of the Paseo Boulevard in Kansas City, Missouri MPS
34	Colonnade Apartment Building at 4302 Oak Street	Colonnade Apartment Building at 4302 Oak Street	September 4, 2008 (#08000857)	4302 Oak St. 39°02′56″N 94°34′56″W	Southmoreland	part of the Colonnade Apartment Buildings of Kansas City, MO MPS
35	Community Church	Community Church	October 9, 2020 (#100005662)	4601 Main St. 39°02′36″N 94°35′12″W		
36	Bernard Corrigan House	Bernard Corrigan House	January 18, 1978 (#78001653)	1200 W. 55th St. 39°01′43″N 94°36′17″W	Sunset Hill	
37	Crestwood Historic District		October 8, 1998 (#98001239)	Roughly bounded by Oak St., the junction of Cherry and Locust Sts., Holmes St., and 56th St. 39°01′46″N 94°34′58″W	Crestwood	
38	O.H. Dean Building	O.H. Dean Building	September 3, 2009 (#09000682)	3625–3635 Main Street; 39°03′39″N 94°35′09″W	Hanover Place	
39	R. J. DeLano School for Crippled Children	R. J. DeLano School for Crippled Children	September 26, 2022 (#100008203)	3708 East Linwood Blvd. 39°04′04″N 94°32′24″W		
40	Walt Disney House	Walt Disney House	May 22, 1978 (#78001654)	3028 Bellefontaine Ave. 39°04′12″N 94°32′50″W	Santa Fe	
41	District I	District I	July 28, 1983 (#83000998)	Armour Boulevard between Broadway and Baltimore Aves. 39°03′51″N 94°35′18″W	Broadway Gillham	part of the Armour Boulevard Multiple Resource Area (MRA)
42	District II	District II	July 28, 1983 (#83001001)	Armour Boulevard between Warwick and Kenwood Aves. 39°03′49″N 94°34′47″W	Broadway Gillham, Hyde Park	part of the Armour Boulevard MRA
43	District III	District III	July 28, 1983 (#83000999)	Armour Boulevard between Charlotte St. and The Paseo; also 3424 and 3426 Harrison Boulevard; 39°03′48″N 94°34′12″W	Center City, Hyde Park, Squier Park	Part of the Armour Boulevard MRA. Harrison Boulevard represents a boundary increase of June 13, 2006
44	Dorson Apartment Building	Dorson Apartment Building	May 5, 1987 (#87000906)	912–918 Benton Boulevard; 39°06′06″N 94°32′41″W	Independence Plaza	
45	East 27th Street Colonnades Historic District	East 27th Street Colonnades Historic District	June 28, 2006 (#06000538)	1300-02, 1312-14, and 1320-22 E. 27th St. 39°04′40″N 94°34′04″W	Beacon Hill-McFeders	
46	East Plaza Apartments Historic District		April 1, 2025 (#100011650)	205-323 Emanuel Cleaver II Boulevard, 127-237 East 46th Street, 4618 Warwick Boulevard; 39°02′35″N 94°35′06″W		
47	East Side Apartments Historic District		January 19, 2022 (#100007359)	5212-5314 East 12th St., 1103-1123 Hardesty Ave., 5308-5315 Williamsburg Ct., 5101-5315 Winner Rd. 39°05′54″N 94°31′14″W		
48	El Torreon Ballroom	El Torreon Ballroom	January 3, 2022 (#100007262)	3101 Gillham Plz. 39°04′13″N 94°34′44″W		
49	Ellsworth Apartments	Ellsworth Apartments	October 22, 2002 (#02001203)	928 Paseo Boulevard; 39°06′08″N 94°33′51″W	Paseo West	part of the Apartment Buildings on the North End of the Paseo Boulevard in Kansas City, Missouri MPS
50	Elmwood Cemetery	Elmwood Cemetery	July 28, 1983 (#83001002)	4900 Truman Rd. 39°05′46″N 94°31′33″W	Sheffield	
51	Fire Station No. 11	Fire Station No. 11	January 29, 2026 (#100012650)	2033 Vine Street; 39°05′14″N 94°33′49″W		
52	Firestone Tire and Rubber Company Service Station	Firestone Tire and Rubber Company Service Station	October 7, 2021 (#100007044)	1112 East Linwood Blvd. 39°04′07″N 94°34′16″W		
53	First Swedish Baptist Church	First Swedish Baptist Church	May 20, 2018 (#100002425)	3931 Washington St. 39°03′21″N 94°35′30″W		
54	Jacobs Floyd House	Jacobs Floyd House	September 8, 1983 (#83001003)	5050 Sunset Dr. 39°02′10″N 94°35′55″W	Sunset Hill	part of the Residential Structures by Mary Rockwell Hook Thematic Resource (TR)
55	Four Gates Farm		July 15, 1991 (#83004871)	13001 Little Blue Rd. 38°59′52″N 94°25′46″W	Little Blue Valley	part of the Residential Structures by Mary Rockwell Hook TR
56	Hunter Gary House	Hunter Gary House	February 13, 2008 (#08000022)	1228 W. 56th St. 39°01′37″N 94°36′20″W	Sunset Hill	
57	Gillham Court Apartments Building	Gillham Court Apartments Building	November 7, 2007 (#07001156)	3411 Gillham Rd. 39°03′53″N 94°34′50″W	Hyde Park	part of the Working-Class and Middle-Income Apartment Buildings in Kansas City, Missouri MPS
58	Gillis Orphans' Home	Gillis Orphans' Home	July 10, 2017 (#100001300)	2119 Tracy Ave. 39°05′11″N 94°34′04″W		
59	Goodenow Textiles Company Building	Goodenow Textiles Company Building	April 18, 2003 (#03000297)	3710 Main St. 39°03′35″N 94°35′10″W	Hanover Place	
60	Gotham Apartments	Gotham Apartments	July 16, 2017 (#100001349)	2718 Linwood Blvd. 39°04′06″N 94°33′03″W	Santa Fe	
61	John Hancock Building	John Hancock Building	July 26, 2024 (#100010555)	800 W. 47th Street; 39°02′33″N 94°35′48″W		
62	Col. John Harris House	Col. John Harris House	October 18, 1972 (#72000717)	4000 Baltimore Ave. 39°03′15″N 94°35′16″W	Westport	
63	Hazelle, Inc. Building	Hazelle, Inc. Building	February 1, 2021 (#100006075)	1224 Admiral Blvd. 39°06′20″N 94°34′02″W		
64	Ferd. Heim Brewing Company Bottling Plant	Ferd. Heim Brewing Company Bottling Plant	June 7, 2016 (#15001018)	507 N. Montgall Ave. 39°07′11″N 94°32′57″W		
65	Heim Fire Station No. 20	Heim Fire Station No. 20	January 4, 2024 (#100009693)	2701 Guinotte Ave. 39°07′09″N 94°32′57″W		
66	Dr. Generous Henderson House	Dr. Generous Henderson House	February 26, 1979 (#79001368)	1016 The Paseo; 39°06′04″N 94°33′51″W	Paseo West	
67	Hiland Telephone Exchange Building	Hiland Telephone Exchange Building	May 6, 2005 (#05000373)	1020 E. 63rd St. 39°00′55″N 94°34′30″W	Holmes Park	
68	Mary Rockwell Hook House	Mary Rockwell Hook House	September 8, 1983 (#83001005)	4940 Summit St. 39°02′15″N 94°35′48″W	Sunset Hill	part of the Residential Structures by Mary Rockwell Hook TR
69	House at 5011 Sunset Drive	House at 5011 Sunset Drive	September 8, 1983 (#83001006)	5011 Sunset Dr. 39°02′13″N 94°35′50″W	Sunset Hill	part of the Residential Structures by Mary Rockwell Hook TR
70	House at 54 E. 53rd Terrace	House at 54 E. 53rd Terrace	September 8, 1983 (#83001007)	54 E. 53rd Terrace; 39°01′49″N 94°35′06″W	Countryside	part of the Residential Structures by Mary Rockwell Hook TR
71	Hyde Park Historic District		November 21, 1980 (#80002364)	Roughly bounded by Armour and Harrison Boulevards, 39th St., and Gillham Rd. 39°03′36″N 94°34′38″W	Hyde Park	
72	Independence Boulevard Christian Church	Independence Boulevard Christian Church	January 14, 2015 (#14001158)	606 Gladstone Blvd. 39°06′21″N 94°32′47″W		
73	Interstate Bakeries Corporation Headquarters	Interstate Bakeries Corporation Headquarters	September 1, 2015 (#15000553)	12 E. Armour Blvd. 39°03′51″N 94°35′06″W		
74	Janssen Place Historic District	Janssen Place Historic District	November 7, 1976 (#76001111)	Janssen Pl. 39°03′36″N 94°34′41″W	Hyde Park	
75	R. Bryson Jones House	R. Bryson Jones House	April 15, 2009 (#09000205)	1045 W. 56th St. 39°01′35″N 94°36′06″W	Ward Estates	
76	Kansas City Athenaeum	Kansas City Athenaeum	October 11, 1979 (#79001371)	900 E. Linwood Boulevard; 39°04′09″N 94°34′26″W	Hyde Park	
77	Kansas City Masonic Temple	Kansas City Masonic Temple	November 14, 1980 (#80002365)	903 Harrison St. 39°06′11″N 94°34′15″W	Paseo West	
78	Kansas City National Guard Armory	Kansas City National Guard Armory	February 24, 2020 (#100004986)	3620 Main St. 39°03′40″N 94°35′09″W		
79	Kansas City Parks and Boulevards Historic District		August 9, 2016 (#14000931)	Roughly bounded by Missouri R., Hardesty Ave., Armour Blvd. & State Line. 39°04′57″N 94°33′18″W		
80	Kansas City Quartermaster Depot Historic District		October 19, 2026 (#100013537)	607 Hardesty Avenue; 39°06′14″N 94°31′03″W		
81	Michael H. and Rose Katz House	Michael H. and Rose Katz House	March 22, 2004 (#04000212)	5930 Ward Parkway; 39°01′11″N 94°36′10″W	Stratford Gardens	
82	Charles S. Keith House	Charles S. Keith House	March 31, 2000 (#00000308)	1214 W. 55th St. 39°01′44″N 94°36′20″W	Sunset Hill	
83	Kelly's Westport Inn	Kelly's Westport Inn	September 7, 1972 (#72000718)	Westport Rd. and Pennsylvania Ave. 39°03′10″N 94°35′30″W	Westport	
84	Kessler Apartments	Kessler Apartments	October 22, 2002 (#02001202)	924 Paseo Boulevard; 39°06′08″N 94°33′51″W	Paseo West	part of the Apartment Buildings on the North End of the Paseo Boulevard in Kansas City, Missouri MPS
85	William Baker and Mary Knight House	William Baker and Mary Knight House	October 18, 2003 (#03001054)	3534 Walnut St. 39°03′44″N 94°35′05″W	Hanover Place	
86	Kuehne-Schmidt Apartments	Kuehne-Schmidt Apartments	February 13, 2007 (#07000040)	3737-39 and 3741-43 Main Sts. 39°03′32″N 94°35′08″W	Hanover Place	part of the Colonnade Apartment Buildings of Kansas City, MO MPS
87	Sanford B. Ladd School	Sanford B. Ladd School	September 20, 2021 (#100006918)	3640 Benton Bvld. 39°03′33″N 94°32′48″W		
88	Lincoln High School	Lincoln High School	January 15, 2014 (#13001086)	2111 Woodland Ave. 39°05′13″N 94°33′37″W	Wendell Phillips	
89	Linwood Presbyterian Church and Home for Convalescent Employed Women	Linwood Presbyterian Church and Home for Convalescent Employed Women	August 7, 2012 (#12000472)	1801 Linwood Boulevard and 3212 Michigan Ave. 39°04′05″N 94°33′41″W	Key Coalition	
90	Locust Street Apartments	Locust Street Apartments	April 29, 2011 (#11000249)	3421 and 3425 Locust St. 39°03′52″N 94°34′46″W	Hyde Park	part of the Working-Class and Middle-Income Apartment Buildings in Kansas City, Missouri MPS
91	R.A. Long House	R.A. Long House	November 14, 1980 (#80002366)	3218 Gladstone Boulevard; 39°06′57″N 94°32′33″W	Scarritt Point	
92	Jacob Loose House	Jacob Loose House	July 28, 1983 (#83001008)	101 E. Armour Boulevard; 39°03′49″N 94°35′03″W	Hanover Place	part of the Armour Boulevard MRA
93	Loretto Academy	Loretto Academy	July 28, 1983 (#83001009)	1111 W. 39th St. 39°03′23″N 94°36′01″W	Volker	
94	Emily Rockwell Love House	Emily Rockwell Love House	September 8, 1983 (#83001010)	5029 Sunset Dr. 39°02′10″N 94°35′51″W	Sunset Hill	part of the Residential Structures by Mary Rockwell Hook TR
95	Luzier Special Formula Laboratories Building	Luzier Special Formula Laboratories Building	January 2, 2018 (#100001351)	3216 Gillham Plaza; 39°04′05″N 94°34′45″W		
96	Maine Apartments	Maine Apartments	October 22, 2002 (#02001198)	1300 Paseo Boulevard; 39°05′52″N 94°33′53″W	Paseo West	part of the Apartment Buildings on the North End of the Paseo Boulevard in Kansas City, Missouri MPS
97	Majestic Apartments	Majestic Apartments	October 17, 2003 (#03001052)	701–707 Benton Boulevard; 39°06′14″N 94°32′38″W	Lykins	
98	Alexander Majors House	Alexander Majors House	April 3, 1970 (#70000335)	8145 State Line Rd. 38°58′47″N 94°36′29″W	Ward Parkway Plaza	
99	Maples Apartments	Maples Apartments	October 22, 2002 (#02001196)	1401 E. 10th St. 39°06′06″N 94°33′53″W	Paseo West	part of the Apartment Buildings on the North End of the Paseo Boulevard in Kansas City, Missouri MPS
100	Maryland Apartments	Maryland Apartments	October 22, 2002 (#02001204)	930 Paseo Boulevard; 39°06′07″N 94°33′51″W	Paseo West	part of the Apartment Buildings on the North End of the Paseo Boulevard in Kansas City, Missouri MPS
101	Mayfair Apartment Hotel	Mayfair Apartment Hotel	January 29, 2025 (#100011399)	1224 East Linwood Boulevard; 39°04′07″N 94°34′08″W		
102	McConahay Building	McConahay Building	May 22, 1978 (#78001655)	1121–1131 E. 31st St. 39°04′13″N 94°34′13″W	Center City	
103	Levi McIntire House	Levi McIntire House	July 28, 1983 (#83001011)	710 E. Armour Boulevard; 39°03′49″N 94°34′33″W	Hyde Park	part of the Armour Boulevard MRA
104	McMahon Apartments	McMahon Apartments	October 22, 2002 (#02001195)	1106 Paso Boulevard; 39°06′00″N 94°33′51″W	Paseo West	part of the Apartment Buildings on the North End of the Paseo Boulevard in Kansas City, Missouri MPS
105	August Meyer House	August Meyer House	September 9, 1982 (#82003146)	4415 Warwick Boulevard; 39°02′49″N 94°35′00″W	Southmoreland	
106	Michelson Building	Michelson Building	January 29, 2018 (#100002033)	3125-3133 Troost Ave. 39°04′11″N 94°34′17″W		
107	Milo Apartments	Milo Apartments	October 25, 2011 (#11000763)	1014–1020 W. 44th St. 39°02′54″N 94°35′57″W	West Plaza	part of the Working-Class and Middle-Income Apartment Buildings in Kansas City, Missouri MPS
108	Mineral Hall	Mineral Hall	July 12, 1976 (#76001112)	4340 Oak St. 39°02′52″N 94°34′56″W	Southmoreland	
109	Missouri Apartments	Missouri Apartments	October 22, 2002 (#02001197)	1304 Paseo Boulevard; 39°05′52″N 94°33′53″W	Paseo West	part of the Apartment Buildings on the North End of the Paseo Boulevard in Kansas City, Missouri MPS
110	Mutual Ice Company Building	Mutual Ice Company Building	August 4, 2004 (#04000783)	4142–4144 Pennsylvania Ave. 39°03′04″N 94°35′26″W	Westport	
111	Mutual Musicians' Foundation Building	Mutual Musicians' Foundation Building	February 7, 1979 (#79001372)	1823 Highland Ave. 39°05′25″N 94°33′43″W	Wendell Phillips	
112	George J. Myers House	George J. Myers House	July 28, 1983 (#83001012)	633 E. Armour Boulevard; 39°03′47″N 94°34′36″W	Hyde Park	part of the Armour Boulevard MRA
113	National Cloak and Suit Company	National Cloak and Suit Company	January 29, 2018 (#100002034)	5401 Independence Ave. 39°06′19″N 94°31′06″W		
114	George H. Nettleton Home	George H. Nettleton Home	October 14, 1999 (#99001253)	5125 Swope Parkway; 39°01′57″N 94°32′31″W	Town Fork Creek	
115	New England Apartments	New England Apartments	October 22, 2002 (#02001200)	1116 Paseo Boulevard; 39°05′59″N 94°33′51″W	Paseo West	part of the Apartment Buildings on the North End of the Paseo Boulevard in Kansas City, Missouri MPS. No longer extant per Google Street View.
116	New Santa Fe "Three Trails" Trail Swales	New Santa Fe "Three Trails" Trail Swales	August 22, 2012 (#12000526)	W. Santa Fe Trail, ½ block west of the junction with Madison Ave. 38°54′23″N 94°36′23″W	Blue Hills Estates	part of the Santa Fe Trail MPS
117	Newbern Hotel	Newbern Hotel	September 23, 1980 (#80002367)	525 E. Armour Boulevard; 39°03′48″N 94°34′45″W	Hyde Park	
118	D.W. Newcomer's Sons Funeral Home	D.W. Newcomer's Sons Funeral Home	August 9, 1983 (#83001013)	1331 Brush Creek; 39°02′34″N 94°34′07″W	Manheim Park	
119	George E. Nicholson House	George E. Nicholson House	November 25, 2005 (#05001325)	1028 W. 58th St. 39°01′22″N 94°36′04″W	Country Club District	
120	Norman School	Norman School	January 15, 2014 (#13001087)	3514 Jefferson St. 39°03′51″N 94°35′40″W	Valentine	
121	Oakwood Country Club	Oakwood Country Club	February 1, 2021 (#100006076)	9800 Grandview Rd. 38°56′54″N 94°33′10″W		
122	Old Hyde Park East Historic District		May 27, 2004 (#04000527)	Roughly bounded by Armour Boulevard, Walnut St., 39th St., and Gillham Rd. 39°03′42″N 94°35′03″W	Hanover Place	
123	Old Hyde Park West Historic District		May 27, 2004 (#04000526)	Roughly bounded by Linwood Boulevard, Central, 39th St., and Baltimore St. 39°03′49″N 94°35′17″W	Broadway Gillham	
124	Robert Ostertag House	Robert Ostertag House	September 8, 1983 (#83001014)	5030 Summit St. 39°02′10″N 94°35′49″W	Sunset Hill	part of the Residential Structures by Mary Rockwell Hook TR
125	Parade Park Maintenance Building	Parade Park Maintenance Building	July 24, 2008 (#08000719)	1722 Woodland Ave. 39°05′31″N 94°33′40″W	18th and Vine-Downtown East	
126	Paris and Weaver Apartment Buildings	Paris and Weaver Apartment Buildings	July 5, 2006 (#06000545)	3944-46 and 3948-50 Walnut St. 39°03′17″N 94°35′07″W	Southmoreland	part of the Colonnade Apartment Buildings of Kansas City, MO MPS
127	Park Lane Apartments	Park Lane Apartments	May 5, 2004 (#04000387)	4600–4606 J.C. Nichols Parkway; 39°02′38″N 94°35′20″W	Plaza Westport	
128	Park Manor Historic District	Park Manor Historic District	February 1, 2006 (#05001610)	910 Ward Parkway, 920 Ward Parkway, and 4826 Roanoke Parkway; 39°02′29″N 94°35′54″W	West Plaza	
129	The Parkview	The Parkview	October 22, 2002 (#02001205)	1000 Paseo Boulevard; 39°06′05″N 94°33′51″W	Paseo West	part of the Apartment Buildings on the North End of the Paseo Boulevard in Kansas City, Missouri MPS
130	Paseo YMCA	Paseo YMCA	September 9, 1991 (#91001151)	1824 The Paseo; 39°05′25″N 94°33′53″W	18th and Vine-Downtown East	part of the 18th and Vine Area of Kansas City MPS
131	Charles and Josephine Peters House	Charles and Josephine Peters House	March 15, 2016 (#16000085)	1228 W. 55th St. 39°01′42″N 94°36′25″W		
132	Pilgrim Lutheran Church for the Deaf of Greater Kansas City and Parsonage	Pilgrim Lutheran Church for the Deaf of Greater Kansas City and Parsonage	January 25, 2001 (#00000334)	3801–3807 Gilham Rd. 39°03′29″N 94°34′52″W	Hyde Park	
133	Pink House	Pink House	September 8, 1983 (#83001015)	5012 Summit St. 39°02′13″N 94°35′48″W	Sunset Hill	part of the Residential Structures by Mary Rockwell Hook TR
134	Plaza House Apartments	Plaza House Apartments	October 16, 2013 (#13000837)	4712 Roanoke Pkwy. 39°02′31″N 94°35′52″W	Kansas City	Part of the Working-Class and Middle-Income Apartment Buildings in Kansas City, Missouri MPS
135	Plaza Towers	Plaza Towers	February 23, 2016 (#16000030)	209 Emanuel Cleaver II Blvd. 39°02′31″N 94°35′04″W	Kansas City	Part of the Working-Class and Middle-Income Apartment Buildings in Kansas City, Missouri MPS
136	Pratt and Whitney Plant Complex	Pratt and Whitney Plant Complex	August 28, 2013 (#13000381)	1500 & 2000 E. Bannister Rd. 38°57′27″N 94°34′15″W	South Kansas City	
137	President Gardens Apartments Historic District	President Gardens Apartments Historic District	December 10, 1998 (#98001503)	Roughly along President Ave., 83rd St., and 82nd Terrace between Lydia and Troost Aves. 38°58′40″N 94°34′25″W	Marlborough Heights	
138	William D. Repp House	William D. Repp House	July 28, 1983 (#83001017)	721 E. Armour Blvd. 39°03′47″N 94°34′32″W	Hyde Park	part of the Armour Boulevard MRA
139	Rockhill Neighborhood		July 21, 1975 (#75001068)	Both sides of 47th St. from Locust St. (S. Pierce St.) to both sides of Harrison St. (north to Brush Creek Boulevard); 39°02′31″N 94°34′36″W	Rockhill	
140	Bertrand Rockwell House	Bertrand Rockwell House	September 8, 1983 (#83001018)	1004 W. 52nd St. 39°02′02″N 94°35′59″W	Sunset Hill	part of the Residential Structures by Mary Rockwell Hook TR
141	Row House Buildings	Row House Buildings	May 22, 1978 (#78001658)	1–7 E. 34th St. and 3401 Main St.; also 9–23 E. 34th St. 39°03′56″N 94°35′06″W	Broadway Gillham	Second set of addresses represents a boundary increase of January 15, 1985
142	Safeway No. 357	Safeway No. 357	March 7, 2023 (#100008688)	3740 Troost Ave. 39°03′30″N 94°34′20″W		
143	St. Francis Xavier Parish Church & Rectory	St. Francis Xavier Parish Church & Rectory	March 28, 2022 (#100007529)	1001 East 52nd St. 39°01′57″N 94°34′27″W		
144	St. Francis Xavier School	St. Francis Xavier School	October 23, 2017 (#100001760)	5220 Troost Ave. 39°01′52″N 94°34′25″W		
145	St. John's High School and Seminary	St. John's High School and Seminary	June 3, 2021 (#100006589)	2015-2131 East 72nd St. 38°59′47″N 94°33′48″W		
146	St. Regis Hotel	St. Regis Hotel	December 3, 2013 (#13000885)	1400–1402 E. Linwood Blvd. 39°04′08″N 94°33′59″W	Center City	
147	St. Stephen Baptist Church	St. Stephen Baptist Church	January 29, 2026 (#100012645)	1414 East Truman Road; 39°05′43″N 94°33′54″W		
148	St. Teresa's Academy Music and Arts Building	St. Teresa's Academy Music and Arts Building	November 15, 2000 (#00001375)	5600 Main St. 39°01′33″N 94°35′23″W	Countryside	
149	Santa Fe Place Historic District		May 30, 1986 (#86001204)	Roughly bounded by 27th St., Indiana Ave., 30th St., and Prospect Ave. 39°04′31″N 94°33′06″W	Santa Fe	
150	Santa Fe Trail-Minor Park, Kansas City, Trail Segments	Santa Fe Trail-Minor Park, Kansas City, Trail Segments	June 30, 1994 (#94000617)	Red Bridge Rd. east of its junction with Holmes Rd. 38°55′29″N 94°34′31″W	Mission Lake	part of the Santa Fe Trail MPS
151	Rev. Nathan Scarritt House	Rev. Nathan Scarritt House	May 8, 1978 (#78001660)	4038 Central St. 39°03′08″N 94°35′18″W	Westport	
152	Scarritt Point North Historic District		December 1, 1997 (#97001484)	Roughly along Gladstone Boulevard and Windor, Bales, Indiana, and Norledge Aves. 39°06′54″N 94°32′30″W	Scarritt Point	
153	Scarritt Point South Historic District		December 1, 1997 (#97001483)	Roughly aling Gladstone and Benton Boulevards and Thompson Ave. 39°06′38″N 94°32′40″W	Scarritt Point	
154	Edward Lucky Scarritt House	Edward Lucky Scarritt House	May 23, 1977 (#77000809)	3500 Gladstone Boulevard; 39°06′56″N 94°32′24″W	Scarritt Point	
155	William Chick Scarritt House	William Chick Scarritt House	March 21, 1978 (#78001661)	3240 Norledge Ave. 39°07′02″N 94°32′33″W	Scarritt Point	Severely damaged by fire September 19, 2016
156	Seven Oaks School	Seven Oaks School	October 9, 2012 (#12000847)	3711 Jackson Ave. 39°03′29″N 94°32′05″W	Knoches Park	Part of the Kansas City, Missouri School District Pre-1970 MPS
157	Shankman Building	Shankman Building	January 29, 2018 (#100002035)	3115-3123 Troost Ave. 39°04′13″N 94°34′17″W		
158	William Francis Shelley House	William Francis Shelley House	March 17, 1978 (#78001662)	3601 Baltimore Ave. 39°03′42″N 94°35′13″W	Hanover Place	
159	Simpson-Yeomans-Country Side Historic District		September 6, 1984 (#84002576)	Roughly bounded by 51st Terrace, Wornall Rd., and Wyandotte and 54th Sts.; also the general vicinity of W. 51st Terrace, Wornall Rd., W. F7, and W. 57th St.; also E. 52nd St., Brookside Boulevard, Oak St., E. 57th St., and Main St. 39°01′52″N 94°35′27″W	Countryside	Second and third sets of boundaries represent boundary increases of May 26, 2000 and July 14, 2011
160	Sophian Plaza	Sophian Plaza	July 5, 1983 (#83001019)	4618 Warwick Boulevard; 39°02′33″N 94°35′00″W	Southmoreland	
161	South Hyde Park Historic District		November 14, 2007 (#07001186)	Bounded by E. 39th St., the Gillham Parkway, Brush Creek Boulevard, and Troost Ave. 39°03′07″N 94°34′31″W	Hyde Park	
162	South Side Historic District		June 9, 1983 (#83001020)	Roughly bounded by 38th, 40th, Walnut, and Baltimore Sts. 39°03′23″N 94°35′11″W	Hanover Place, Southmoreland, Westport	
163	Spofford Home for Children	Spofford Home for Children	August 23, 2016 (#16000545)	5501 Cleveland Ave. 39°01′33″N 94°32′28″W		
164	Squier Park Historic District		April 24, 2012 (#12000232)	Roughly bounded by Armour Boulevard, Troost Avenue, 39th Street and The Paseo; 39°03′34″N 94°34′10″W	Squier Park	Historic Residential Suburbs in the United States, 1830–1960 MPS
165	Edward A. Stevens House	Edward A. Stevens House	October 24, 2016 (#16000736)	3223 Gladstone Blvd. 39°06′55″N 94°32′31″W	Kansas City	
166	Sunset Tower		December 22, 2021 (#100007263)	4821 Roanoke Pkwy. 39°02′23″N 94°35′50″W	Kansas City	
167	E.F. Swinney School	E.F. Swinney School	October 16, 2013 (#13000838)	1106 W. 47th St. 39°02′36″N 94°36′01″W	Kansas City	Part of the Kansas City, Missouri School District Pre-1970 MPS
168	The Tocoma	The Tocoma	November 24, 1979 (#79003782)	3835 Main St. 39°03′25″N 94°35′08″W	Hanover Place	
169	Alfred Toll House	Alfred Toll House	July 28, 1983 (#83001022)	3502 Warwick Boulevard; 39°03′48″N 94°35′01″W	Hanover Place	part of the Armour Boulevard MRA
170	Town of Kansas Site		June 28, 2011 (#11000399)	Address Restricted	Kansas City	part of the Railroad Related Historic Commercial and Industrial Resources in Kansas City, Missouri MPS
171	Norman Tromanhauser House	Norman Tromanhauser House	January 26, 2001 (#01000014)	3603 W. Roanoke Dr. 39°03′43″N 94°36′05″W	Volker	
172	Uptown Building and Theatre	Uptown Building and Theatre	June 27, 1979 (#79001374)	3700–3712 Broadway; 39°03′40″N 94°35′27″W	Valentine	
173	Valentine on Broadway Hotel	Valentine on Broadway Hotel	August 1, 2008 (#08000745)	3724 Broadway Boulevard; 39°03′37″N 94°35′27″W	Valentine	
174	Ira C. and Charles S. Van Noy Houses	Ira C. and Charles S. Van Noy Houses	July 8, 1987 (#87000505)	6700 and 6800 Elmwood; 39°00′11″N 94°32′04″W	Foxtown East	
175	Villa Serena Apartment Hotel	Villa Serena Apartment Hotel	April 15, 2009 (#09000207)	325 Ward Parkway; 39°02′23″N 94°35′29″W	South Plaza	
176	Virginia Apartments	Virginia Apartments	October 22, 2002 (#02001201)	1100 Paseo Boulevard; 39°06′01″N 94°33′51″W	Paseo West	part of the Apartment Buildings on the North End of the Paseo Boulevard in Kansas City, Missouri MPS
177	William Volker House	William Volker House	May 20, 1993 (#93000408)	3717 Bell St. 39°03′35″N 94°36′21″W	Volker	
178	Waldo Water Tower	Waldo Water Tower	April 18, 1977 (#77000810)	75th St. and Holmes Rd., Tower Park; 38°59′25″N 94°34′55″W	Tower Homes	
179	Seth E. Ward Homestead	Seth E. Ward Homestead	February 17, 1978 (#78001664)	1032 W. 55th St. 39°01′42″N 94°36′06″W	Sunset Hill	
180	Westport High School	Westport High School	February 2, 2015 (#14001239)	315 E. 39th St. 39°03′21″N 94°34′53″W	Westport	
181	Westport Junior High School	Westport Junior High School	April 15, 2014 (#14000162)	300 E. 39th St. 39°03′25″N 94°34′58″W	Westport	
182	Wheatley-Provident Hospital	Wheatley-Provident Hospital	October 8, 2020 (#100005665)	1826 Forest Ave. 39°05′26″N 94°34′08″W		
183	Phillis Wheatley School-Willis Chapel AME Church	Phillis Wheatley School-Willis Chapel AME Church	January 29, 2026 (#100012644)	2850 E. 54th Street; 39°01′42″N 94°33′07″W		
184	Windsor Hall Apartments	Windsor Hall Apartments	January 14, 2011 (#10001129)	3420 Locust St. 39°03′52″N 94°34′48″W	Hyde Park	part of the Working Class Hotels at 19th and Main Streets, Kansas City, Missouri MPS
185	F. W. Woolworth Building	F. W. Woolworth Building	May 6, 2005 (#05000372)	3120–3122 Troost Ave. 39°04′11″N 94°34′18″W	Hyde Park	
186	Wornall House	Wornall House	May 21, 1969 (#69000109)	146 W. 61st St. 39°01′00″N 94°35′32″W	Wornall Homestead	

== Former listings ==
	Name on the Register	Image	Date listed	Date removed	Location	City or town	Description
1	Henry T. Fowler House		July 28, 1983 (#83001004)	January 7, 2025	3 E. Armour Boulevard; 39°03′49″N 94°35′07″W	Hanover Place	part of the Armour Boulevard MRA. Demolished.
2	Holy Name Catholic Church		September 25, 2003 (#03000964)	January 7, 2025	2800 E. 23rd St. 39°05′05″N 94°32′57″W	Washington-Wheatley	Demolished about 2011.
3	Ivanhoe Masonic Temple		May 2, 1985 (#85000942)	January 7, 2025	2301 E. Linwood Boulevard and 3201 Park Ave. 39°04′05″N 94°33′22″W	Key Coalition	Demolished 2002.
4	Knickerbocker Apartments	Knickerbocker Apartments	June 13, 2003 (#03000525)	January 7, 2025	501–535 Knickerbocker Place; 39°03′45″N 94°35′32″W	Valentine	
5	Westminster Congregational Church	Westminster Congregational Church	February 28, 1980 (#80002369)	January 7, 2025	3600 Walnut St. 39°03′42″N 94°35′06″W	Hanover Place	

== See also ==
- List of National Historic Landmarks in Missouri
- National Register of Historic Places listings in Kansas City, Missouri
