= Sophian Plaza =

Condominium building in Kansas City, MO

- U.S. National Register of Historic Places
- Kansas City Historic Place
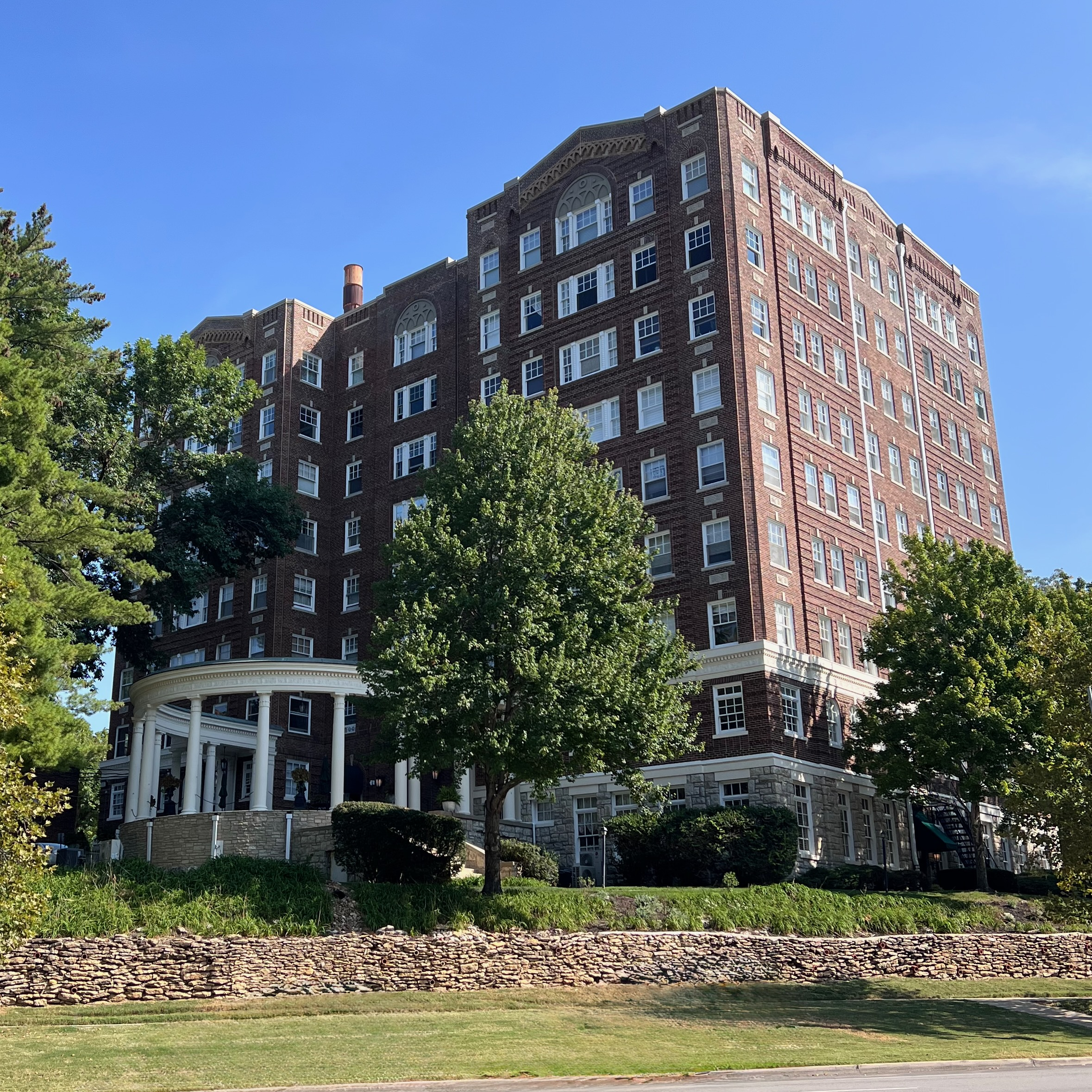
- Location: 4618 Warwick Blvd., Kansas City, MO
- Coordinates: 39°2′33″N 94°35′0″W
- Built: 1922–1923
- Architect: Charles E. Shepard, Shepard & Wiser
- Architectural style: Beaux-Arts
- Website: https://www.sophianplazakc.com/
- NRHP reference No.: 83001019

Significant dates
- Added to NRHP: July 5, 1983
- Designated KCHP: May 8, 1986

The Sophian Plaza is a condominium building at 4618 Warwick Boulevard, Kansas City, Missouri, opened in 1923. It is sited in the museum district, at the junction of Warwick Boulevard and Emanuel Cleaver II Boulevard (originally called Brush Creek Boulevard). It faces Southmoreland Park. On its opening day, the Kansas City Star heralded the Sophian Plaza as a luxury high-rise of imposing structure of Italian architecture. A building of the same name was built in Tulsa, Oklahoma, three years later (1926).

The eight-story Sophian Plaza apartment hotel was built by Harry J. Sophian and designed by architect Charles E. Shepard of the Shepard & Wiser firm. It was designed in the Beaux-Arts classical style with an H-shaped floor plan. The building is freestanding, allowing each façade to remain visible.

The building was erected between 1922 and 1923 by Manhattan Construction Company. Its opening dinner was celebrated on February 24, 1923.

The Sophian was designed to harmonize with the Southmoreland neighborhood of large homes built by prominent Kansas City business leaders. It adopted classical design elements, materials, and proportions similar to the surrounding homes. The building features a colonnaded entryway and landscaped grounds and remains part of the city’s early 20th-century streetscape.

The Sophian Plaza was placed on the National Register of Historic Places by the National Park Service on July 5, 1983. The nomination noted, “The scale, location, and Beaux-Arts design make the Sophian Plaza an imposing example of the high-rise luxury apartments.” It was added to the Kansas City Register of Historic Places in 1986.

== Commercial tenants ==
During its early decades, various business and commercial tenants were located on the grade level concourse of the building, including a luxury restaurant, a milliner shop, and a beauty salon. Later, the restaurant space was taken over by the University Women’s Club (1932-79). The Martha Belle Aikins Smith dance studio, known for preparing young girls and boys for the debutante Jewel Ball, also operated out of the Sophian concourse level. The concourse level is accessible from the main lobby (now closed behind French doors) and directly from the south grounds.

== Ownership changes ==
The Sophian Plaza started as apartment rentals and converted to condominiums in 1979.

The building was sold after Harry Sophian’s death in 1945 to Barney Goodman, a major commercial real estate developer and hotel owner, who purchased the building in 1948. Goodman had made several earlier attempts to purchase the building. Goodman owned numerous other noteworthy apartment hotels in Kansas City (the Bellerive, Locarno, Carlisle, Lowell, Newbern, and Belleclaire). He purchased the iconic Hotel Del Coronado in San Diego, California, in 1948.

The Sophian next changed hands in 1954, when it was sold to Charles A. Gambrill, a Kansas City realtor. In 1955, five residents of the Sophian formed a partnership to buy the building. They contracted with the L.J. Baer Company to manage the property. In 1977, the complex was sold to Avis Enterprises of Ann Arbor, Michigan. L.J. Baer was engaged to manage the transition from rental units to condominium ownership in 1978.

== Historic stewardship ==
The condominium owners championed the historic designation of the building. The Sophian Plaza Homeowners Association has focused on the care, maintenance, and restoration of the building to preserve and honor its place in the architectural and social history of Kansas City.

The most recent restoration work on the façade and front and back colonnades (2018-23) was performed by Mid-Continental Restoration Co. Inc. under the design of architectural engineer Thos. Rewerts & Co, LLC. Custom cast stone decorative elements were re-created by Architectural Cast Stone (Chicago). Historic Kansas City Foundation awarded the Sophian its 2020 Historic Preservation Award for Outstanding Craftsmanship for the renovation of the entry colonnade.

== Site ==
The Sophian Plaza sits at 4618 Warwick Boulevard, at the edge of Southmoreland Park, on a 3½-acre irregular lot. It occupies the southernmost property on Warwick Boulevard, as it terminates at Emanuel Cleaver II Boulevard (originally called Brush Creek Boulevard). This frontage is the final section of Warwick Boulevard, as it curves around Southmoreland Park.

The frontage on Warwick Boulevard measures 116 feet 5 inches; the frontage on Emanuel Cleaver II Boulevard measures 96 feet. The site slopes away from the northeastern corner to the south. The parcel is supported by a native stone retaining wall on the perimeter of Emanuel Cleaver II Boulevard.

The building’s orientation on the lot was designed to maximize light and air circulation. Per reporting by the Kansas City Star, “Sophian Plaza will not observe the points of the compass closely. The principal front … will be toward the northeast, facing Southmoreland Park. By this arrangement, architects Shepard & Wiser promise the sun will reach every room in the building sometime during the day.”

As a Jewish builder, Harry Sophian was well aware of the impact of racially restrictive covenants in nearby neighborhoods that excluded African American and Jewish people. Sophian addressed those restrictions when he announced the erection of the building, the significance of his chosen site, and the design goals that he set. Harry Sophian announced, “I desire a structure that will measure up to its environment out there on the edge of the Rockhill district. To the north and east are restricted home areas. I told my architects to instill into the towering brick and stone the fine residential character of the neighborhood.”

== Architecture ==
The Sophian Plaza is characterized by the Beaux-Arts preference for large, grandiose compositions and an abundance of ornamental detail and surface textures.

The steel frame construction has exterior walls of brick, laid in stretcher and Flemish bond, on floors one through eight, and limestone with terracotta detailing about the openings. There are 13 bays on the east and west façade and 11 bays on the north and south sides of the building. A decorated parapet rises to conceal a flat composition roof.

The planning and massing of the structure are symmetrical. The composition is divided into three parts with climactic features on both east and west façades. The building is freestanding, fully viewable from all directions. Every façade features decorative brickwork, frieze, and window ornamentation.

The front entrance facing Southmoreland Park comprises a two-story central pavilion composed of colossal columns, crowned by an enriched entablature supporting a balustrade and free-standing sculpture. Wrought iron light fixtures are suspended from the soffit of the entablature between each column. A wrought iron fence is placed directly behind the columns. A monumental flight of steps ascends to the front door. The front courtyard design is characteristic of Beaux-Arts pavilions. A preference for advancing and receding planes is evident in the central recessed bay as well as in the shadows cast by the differentiated surface textures of rusticated, corbeled, and patterned brick, rock-faced limestone, and molded terracotta ornament.

The building includes elements that are emblematic of the homes and institutions surrounding Southmoreland Park, namely native limestone cladding on the foundation levels and the use of native stone walls.

The west façade (rear), facing Country Club Plaza, mirrors elements of the east façade such as a recessed central bay. It’s most notable feature is a semi-circular colonnade. Colossal columns support an enriched entablature and encircle an open-air patio raised on a rock-faced limestone base. The patio has an upper platform with a balustrade that descends a few steps to a semi-circular pavilion, which is surfaced in marble.

The frieze on the entablature that tops the front and rear columns runs as a band around the building, connecting the front to the back and verso. The first-floor windows are semi-circular headed. The building has 686 symmetrically arranged windows with arched and linteled openings; many are framed by colonettes and pilasters.

The front courtyard and rear open-air pavilion are connected by a central lobby. The lobby design uses classical revival and neoclassical prototypes for both its floor plan and decoration. A high gilt coffered ceiling overlooks black and white marble floors and ornamented white plaster cornices, piers, and arched panels. A fireplace is centered along the west wall. Located on either side of the central lobby, marble steps ascend to hallways containing mail and service rooms to the north and elevators to the south. Casement windows and French doors bring light, ventilation, and visual connection between the front and rear portals of the building.

The Sophian Plaza has 46 condominium apartments. The floor plans for each apartment create zones that provide a service entrance with direct access to the kitchen, as well as a primary family and guest entrance into the social rooms of the home. The larger apartments are characteristic of Classic Six apartment floor plans in New York City’s pre-war buildings, which entail a living room, dining room, kitchen, and three bedrooms, where the third bedroom and bath off the kitchen were originally designed as living quarters for house staff.

== Neighborhood ==
The Southmoreland neighborhood was platted in 1899 by W.B. Clarke. The curving, tree lined streets, small parks, and vistas within the area reflect the influence of the City Beautiful Movement. Two of the most notable proponents of the Movement and its design principles in Kansas City were William Rockhill Nelson and August Meyer. They each built their prominent residences to the north and east of Southmoreland Park and helped establish the neighborhood's City Beautiful character. Nelson was publisher of the Kansas City Star and Kansas City Times and developer of the adjacent Rockhill neighborhood to the east of his home. August Meyer was a mining magnate and was president of Kansas City’s first-ever Parks Board.

Meyer and the Parks Board were charged with creating a street plan to transform Kansas City from a pioneer town to a first-class metropolis. They engaged landscape architect George Kessler to create an ambitious design. With the support of Nelson’s Kansas City Star, they devised and championed a web of parks and boulevards that made Kansas City a prominent example of the City Beautiful Movement. Southmoreland remains a relatively intact representation of that era of Kansas City.

In both the Southmoreland and Rockhill districts, per the City Beautiful precepts, thoroughfares correspond to the natural topography of the terrain, providing relief from the usual grid street pattern. Notably, every property surrounding Southmoreland Park matches the park’s use of native limestone for retaining walls, border walls, and foundation cladding. These features became identifying characteristics of the City Beautiful Movement throughout the Southmoreland and Rockhill neighborhoods.

Nelson and Meyer and others envisioned an evolution of the neighborhood from one that was exclusively residential to a neighborhood that intermixed stately homes and arts institutions. At the cusp of the twentieth century, Nelson planned for his grand home to become the site for a museum worthy of Kansas City, a rising metropolis. He gifted the land and funds to create a museum and purchase art. The neighborhood now includes the acclaimed Nelson-Atkins Museum, opened in 1933.

August Meyer’s home was gifted to the Kansas City Art Institute (KCAI) in 1929, which transformed a local sketch club into a full-scale art school. The gift came with the caveat that it be maintained in harmony with the character of the neighborhood. It is now the centerpiece of the KCAI campus, Vanderslice Hall.

=== Sophian residents and the development of the arts district ===
Residents of the Sophian were instrumental in bringing Nelson’s and Meyer’s vision into realization. Frank Bernardin was the chair of the KCAI board and oversaw the acquisition of Meyer’s home (“Vanderslice Hall”) to become the centerpiece of the new campus, close to the planned Nelson museum site. S. Herbert Hare was the landscape architect for the Nelson-Atkins grounds. Paul Gardner served as the first executive director of the Nelson-Atkins Museum. Many other residents of the Sophian were major donors to the Nelson-Atkins and KCAI.

The neighborhood’s cultural institutions continued to expand. In 1994, Bebe and R. Crosby Kemper Jr. founded the Kemper Museum of Contemporary Art, which flanks KCAI to the west, just north of Southmoreland Park. It was designed by architect Gunnar Birkerts. Later, the Nelson-Atkins Museum added a substantial annex, called the Bloch Building, designed by architect Steven Holl. It opened in 2007.

The neighborhood retains many historic homes. In addition to the Sophian, Vanderslice Hall (August Meyer home), and Mineral Hall are on the National Register of Historic Places. On Warwick Boulevard there are 13 buildings from 43^{rd} Street to 47^{th} Street on the Kansas City Register of Historic Places. Several of these historic buildings have been adaptively reused, such as the Jannes Library for KCAI.

The George B. Richards home at 4526 Warwick Boulevard, fronting Southmoreland Park, is the most recent building to be designated historic. On September 28, 2023, the Kansas City Council voted to place the home on the Kansas City Register of Historic Places, over the owners’ objection.

To the west of the Southmoreland neighborhood and the Sophian lies the Country Club Plaza shopping and restaurant district. It was developed by J. C. Nichols and opened in 1923, the same year as the opening of the Sophian.

== Residents ==
Over its history, the Sophian has been home to residents involved in Kansas City business, arts, medicine, law, and public life.

=== Business and fashion ===
In the 1930s through the 1950s, Kansas City was a major center for clothing manufacturing and retail.

- Sieg and Florence Harzfeld of Harzfeld’s department store; Lester Siegel, president of the company after Harzfeld’s retirement, also lived in the building.
- Herbert Woolf, owner of Woolf Bros. clothiers and founder of Woolford Farms.
- Maude Springe, owner of Swanson’s couture shop in Country Club Plaza.
- Beulah Spilsbury, design director for the Nelly Don fashion house.
- Nell Snead, fashion editor for the Kansas City Star.
- Cornelius “Neil” Giblin, general manager of Kline's department store.
- Barbara Wilkey, fashion director at Harzfeld's

=== Arts, architecture, and design ===
- Paul Gardner, first director of the Nelson-Atkins Museum.
- S. Herbert Hare, landscape architect for the Nelson-Atkins Museum.
- Frank Bernardin, chair of the Kansas City Arts Institute board during acquisition of Vanderslice Hall.
- Daniel MacMorris, muralist and artist associated with the restoration of Panthéon de la Guerre.
- Patricia DuBose Duncan, photographer known for her images of the Flint Hills.
- Ted Seligson, architect and advocate for historic preservation in Kansas City.
- Sally Schwenk, architectural historian.
- Leesa Fanning, curator at the Nelson-Atkins Museum of Art and author of Encountering the Spiritual in Contemporary Art.
- Russell Patterson, music director of the Kansas City Symphony.
- Matt Leisy, stage, television, and film actor.
- David Jimenez, author and interior designer.
- Marti and Tony Oppenheimer, philanthropists and collectors associated with the Nerman Museum.

=== Medicine, law, and public life ===
- Abraham Sophian, infectious disease specialist and advocate for the establishment of Menorah Hospital.
- William Minor, founder of the Thornton-Minor Clinic.
- Rex Diveley, orthopedic surgeon and founder of the Dickson-Diveley Orthopedic Clinic.
- Scott O. Wright, federal judge.
- Randy Clark and Tom Maddox, plaintiffs in same-sex marriage litigation in Nebraska supported by the American Civil Liberties Union.
- Thomas Hoenig, former president of the Federal Reserve Bank of Kansas City.
- Lawrence Hackman, director of the Harry S. Truman Presidential Library and Museum.
