= The Now Now =

2018 studio album by Gorillaz

Studio album by Gorillaz
- Released: 29 June 2018
- Recorded: Late 2017 – February 2018
- Studio: Studio 13 (London); Various additional: Brick Road (Scottsdale) (Note: Additional recording on track 1); The Compound (London) (Note: Additional recording on track 3); Mondrian Hotel (West Hollywood) (Note: Demos for tracks 3 and 11); Raphael Hotel (Kansas City) (Note: Demo for track 4); Knob Hill Inn (Ketchum) (Note: Demo for track 6); Marriott Hotel (Zürich) (Note: Demos for tracks 7 and 10); Delano South Beach (Florida) (Note: Demo for track 8)
- Genres: Synth-pop; funk; psychedelic pop
- Length: 40:42
- Labels: Parlophone; Warner Bros.
- Producers: Gorillaz; James Ford; Remi Kabaka

Gorillaz chronology
Humanz (2017)	The Now Now (2018)	Song Machine, Season One: Strange Timez (2020)

Damon Albarn chronology
Humanz (2017)	The Now Now (2018)	Merrie Land (2018)

Singles from The Now Now
- 1. "Humility" Released: 31 May 2018; 2. "Lake Zurich" Released: 31 May 2018; 3. "Sorcererz" Released: 7 June 2018; 4. "Fire Flies" Released: 14 June 2018; 5. "Hollywood" Released: 21 June 2018; 6. "Tranz" Released: 14 September 2018

The Now Now is the sixth studio album by the British virtual band Gorillaz, released on 29 June 2018 through Parlophone and Warner Bros. Records. It is the first album without virtual member Murdoc Niccals as he was replaced with Ace from The Powerpuff Girls.

Gorillaz co-creator and frontman Damon Albarn began writing and recording the album in late 2017 while on the Humanz Tour. The majority of the album was later completed in February 2018 in London during a break in the band's touring schedule, with James Ford serving as producer. Albarn stated that the album was written and recorded in a brief period of time primarily to allow the band to perform new material on their upcoming tour dates, which were later rebranded as The Now Now Tour following the album's release.

Influenced by 1980s new wave and synth-pop, The Now Now eschews the large roster of guest artists featured on the band's previous album, Humanz, instead pursuing a spacey, simplified sound focused on Albarn. As a result, the album includes only three guest artists: George Benson (on lead single "Humility"), and Snoop Dogg and Jamie Principle (on "Hollywood").

The Now Now debuted at number four on the Billboard 200 and at number five on the UK Albums Chart. It received generally positive reviews from critics, who praised its cohesion and musical and lyrical simplicity, though some criticized it for a perceived lack of ambition and experimentation.

== Background and recording ==
Following the release of their 2017 album Humanz, the co-creator of Gorillaz, Damon Albarn, had hinted at the possibility of a new Gorillaz album arriving sooner than expected, and said he enjoyed recording and debuting new music while on tour. He compared the spontaneous nature of this process to their 2010 album The Fall and wanted to make another record that would feel similar but more complete in comparison; he said, "if we're going to do more with Gorillaz we don't want to wait seven years because ... we're getting on a bit now". He later confirmed Gorillaz were working on another album that was scheduled for release in 2018.

New songs from the album were performed during the Humanz Tour; Gorillaz debuted "Idaho" during a September 2017 concert in Seattle. In March 2018, during a concert in Santiago, the band debuted "Hollywood", which features Jamie Principle and Snoop Dogg. At this concert, Albarn stated the album had recently been finished and would soon be released. That May, a series of posters that contained phrases such as "G is the Magic Number" and "Save Us from Him" – as well as a URL that pointed to a teaser for the album that revealed its title and release date – were found at the music festival All Points East. The website included a short excerpt from a new song that was later released as "Lake Zurich". On 28 May, the day after the festival ended, Emma de Caunes, the wife of Gorillaz co-creator Jamie Hewlett, confirmed the album's release via Instagram.

Recording began during the North American leg of the Humanz Tour in late 2017, but the majority of the album was recorded in February 2018 at Studio 13 in London. In a Radio X interview, Albarn said the album was produced within a short time so the band would have new material to play at upcoming festivals. As a byproduct of the album's expedited production, The Now Now includes fewer guest collaborators than previous Gorillaz records. Albarn credited producer James Ford for extensively contributing to the album's lyrical cohesion, saying; "If this record makes any more sense, it's entirely down to him, not me".

== Music and lyrics ==
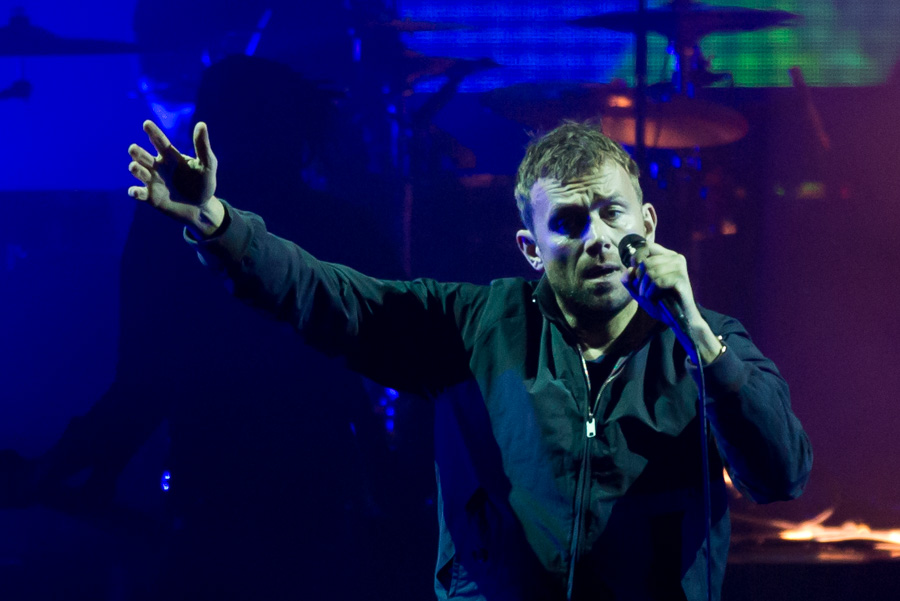
Damon Albarn has described The Now Now as "very sort of in the world of" the fictional Gorillaz lead singer 2-D.

According to Stephen Thomas Erlewine of AllMusic, The Now Now includes elements of 1980s new wave and "yacht soul", which suggest the influence of disco and old-school hip-hop in Albarn's songwriting. Clash magazine described its songs as "slick, mutant funk", while Drowned in Sound noted a "breezy synth-pop style" that it compared with Gorillaz' earlier album Plastic Beach. NME's Thomas Smith called Albarn's lyrics "more introspective" as a result of "[moving] away" from the "bad influences" of 2017's Humanz. Pitchfork described the album as "daydream funk, playful psych-pop, and up-scale disco". Corbin Reid of Uproxx said, "Stuttering synth melodies lock into and swirl around an impressive collection of different and varying drum patterns. The music doesn't knock you down as much as it washes over you like a warm, comforting wave." He also compared it to the music of Tame Impala, noting it is "maybe less psychedelic in execution and more sepia-tinged in feeling". Lily Moayeri from Under the Radar said many of the lyrics are "set in or devoted to the city of Los Angeles", adding "The Now Now gives off the impression of a tour diary". Finn from DIY called the album "A more spaced-out affair, stripped of its star-studded collaborations and bathed in the apparent apathy of the modern age".

== Release and promotion ==
The Now Now was officially announced on 30 May 2018. The following day, a North American seven-date tour to promote the album beginning in October, which was part of The Now Now Tour, was announced. On 24 June, Gorillaz performed The Now Now live at the Boiler Room in Tokyo, Japan, streaming it live on YouTube.

When songs from the album – excluding "Humility" and "Tranz", both of which had music videos – were released, visualisers for them were uploaded to YouTube. (Note: The following is a list of the visualisers from the album that were uploaded to YouTube: Gorillaz (21 June 2018). "Gorillaz – Hollywood feat. Snoop Dogg & Jamie Principle (Visualiser)". YouTube.; Gorillaz (29 June 2018). "Gorillaz – Kansas (Visualiser)". YouTube.; Gorillaz (7 June 2018). "Gorillaz – Sorcererz (Visualiser)". YouTube.; Gorillaz (29 June 2018). "Gorillaz – Idaho (Visualiser)". YouTube.; Gorillaz (31 May 2018). "Gorillaz – Lake Zurich (Visualiser)". YouTube.; Gorillaz (29 June 2018). "Gorillaz – Magic City (Visualiser)". YouTube.; Gorillaz (14 June 2018). "Gorillaz – Fire Flies (Visualiser)". YouTube.; Gorillaz (29 June 2018). "Gorillaz – One Percent (Visualiser)". YouTube.; Gorillaz (30 June 2018). "Gorillaz – Souk Eye (Visualiser)". YouTube.)

=== Singles ===
On 31 May 2018, the songs "Humility", which debuted via Zane Lowe's Beats 1 radio program, and "Lake Zurich", which peaked at 35 on the US Hot Rock Songs chart, were released as singles.

"Humility" had been announced the previous day; it was released with a music video, in which the fictional lead singer of Gorillaz, 2-D is seen roller-skating around Venice Beach. "Humility" peaked at 81 on the UK Singles Chart, at 85 on the US Billboard Hot 100 and at number 7 on the US Hot Rock Songs chart. On 7 June, the album's third single "Sorcererz" was released. The song was originally premiered during Gorillaz's headlining set at Rock im Park. It peaked at 36 on the US Hot Rock Songs chart.

On 14 June, the fourth single, "Fire Flies", was released; it peaked at 32 on the US Hot Rock Songs chart. On 21 June, the fifth single "Hollywood" was released. The song was first heard at a concert in Santiago, Chile. Before the song began, Albarn said to the crowd, "If you go tell anyone that we're putting out a new album very soon, I'll deny it, cause I didn't say that. Alright?". "Hollywood" peaked at 26 on the US Hot Rock Songs chart. On 14 September, the sixth single "Tranz" was released with a music video, which, according to Sam Moore of NME, "depicts the cartoon version of the band's first-ever 'live performance' music video". The song peaked at 16 on the US Hot Rock Songs chart.

== Reception ==
Professional ratings
Aggregate scores
Source	Rating
AnyDecentMusic?	7.0/10
Metacritic	73/100
Review scores
Source	Rating
AllMusic	3.5/5 stars
The A.V. Club	B
The Daily Telegraph	3/5 stars
The Guardian	4/5 stars
The Independent	3/5 stars
NME	4/5 stars
Pitchfork	6.8/10
Q	4/5 stars
Rolling Stone	4/5 stars
Uncut	7/10

=== Critical reception ===
According to the review aggregator Metacritic, The Now Now received "generally favorable reviews" based on a weighted average score of 73 out of 100 from 28 critic scores.

The album, which is a comparably stripped-down affair, was praised for its lyrical and musical simplicity. In his review, NME's Thomas Smith called it a "trim and spritely listen". According to Rolling Stone's Will Hermes, the simplistic approach results in "the band's most coherent LP to date". Many reviewers compared The Now Now with the band's previous two records. Favourably commenting on the new-found coherence reminiscent of The Fall, Drowned in Sound's Duncan Conrad noted the "radically shortened guest list" and the "written-on-the-road simplicity" that are more akin to the band's 2010 fan club giveaway than the "over-stuffed" Humanz. NME's Smith lauded the album as more concise and less "generic" than its "bloated" immediate predecessor. DIY's Rachel Finn said the album feels "easy to just sit back and listen".

Most critics also praised the album's energy and optimism. According to NME, The Now Now consists of "11 pop tracks that zip with energy, passion and an abundance of ideas", Rolling Stone called it "optimistic by [Albarn's] usual standards". Among others, Clash's Wilf Skinner called it "a jubilant and solidly varied ... album".

Some critics felt that there was a lack of ambition on the album. Rolling Stone said there is a distinct lack of "the sparks that come from the usual Gorillaz mess of ideas and personalities". Drowned in Sound called it a "disappointingly minor album, low on standout songs and big ideas", and lacking the band's trademark experimentation.

Critics were also divided on the album's narrative. While Drowned in Sound's Conrad said the album "does very little to advance the mythology [of the band]" and thus "lacks a sense of purpose", NME said its narrative "works in tandem with their current storyline" to the band's "highly entertaining mythology".

GQ in Russia ranked The Now Now as the 18th best album of 2018.

=== Commercial reception ===
The Now Now debuted at number five on the UK Albums Chart, becoming Gorillaz' sixth album to reach the chart's top ten. In the United States, The Now Now debuted at number four on the US Billboard 200 with sales of 63,000 album-equivalent units, of which 52,000 were pure album sales, becoming Gorillaz' fifth top-ten album in the United States.

== Track listing ==
All tracks are written by Damon Albarn, alongside any featured artists, and produced by Gorillaz, James Ford, and Remi Kabaka.

The Now Now – Standard edition
No.	Title	Length
1.	"Humility" (featuring George Benson)	3:17
2.	"Tranz"	2:42
3.	"Hollywood" (featuring Snoop Dogg and Jamie Principle)	4:53
4.	"Kansas"	4:08
5.	"Sorcererz"	3:00
6.	"Idaho"	3:42
7.	"Lake Zurich"	4:13
8.	"Magic City"	4:00
9.	"Fire Flies"	3:53
10.	"One Percent"	2:20
11.	"Souk Eye"	4:34
Total length:		40:42

== Personnel ==
Credits adapted from the liner notes.

Gorillaz

- Damon Albarn – vocals, instrumentation, production (all tracks)
- Jamie Hewlett – artwork, design, video direction
- Junior Dan – bass (track 5)
- Stephen Sedgwick – mixing, engineering, recording
- Karl Vanden Bossche – percussion (track 3)
- Remi Kabaka Jr. – production, percussion, drum programming (track 7)
- John Davis – mastering
- Samuel Egglenton – engineering assistance
- James Ford – production (all tracks), drums, bass guitar (tracks 1–3, 5, 8–11), synthesiser (tracks 1, 4–7)

Additional musicians

- George Benson – guitar (track 1)
- Snoop Dogg – vocals (track 3)
- Jamie Principle – vocals (track 3)
- Abra – additional vocals (track 5)
- Graham Coxon – additional guitar (track 8)

Additional technical

- Mark DeCozio – additional engineering (track 1)
- Stuart Lowbridge – live music co-ordination

Additional artwork

- Stars Redmond – assistance
- Siobhan Battye – assistance

== Charts ==
=== Weekly charts ===
Chart (2018)	Peak position
Australian Albums (ARIA)	4
Austrian Albums (Ö3 Austria)	8
Belgian Albums (Ultratop Flanders)	5
Belgian Albums (Ultratop Wallonia)	2
Canadian Albums (Billboard)	4
Croatian Albums (HDU)	2
Czech Albums (ČNS IFPI)	17
Danish Albums (Hitlisten)	27
Dutch Albums (Album Top 100)	5
Finnish Albums (Suomen virallinen lista)	17
French Albums (SNEP)	6
German Albums (Offizielle Top 100)	10
Greek Albums (IFPI)	28
Hungarian Albums (MAHASZ)	7
Irish Albums (IRMA)	4
Italian Albums (FIMI)	17
Japan Hot Albums (Billboard Japan)	41
Japanese Albums (Oricon)	39
Mexican Albums (Top 100 Mexico)	3
New Zealand Albums (RMNZ)	9
Norwegian Albums (VG-lista)	7
Polish Albums (ZPAV)	27
Portuguese Albums (AFP)	8
Scottish Albums (Official Charts)	4
Spanish Albums (Promusicae)	11
Swedish Albums (Sverigetopplistan)	18
Swiss Albums (Romandie)	1
Swiss Albums (Schweizer Hitparade)	3
UK Albums (Official Charts)	5
US Billboard 200	4
US Top Alternative Albums (Billboard)	2
US Top Rock Albums (Billboard)	2
US Indie Store Album Sales (Billboard)	1
US Vinyl Albums (Billboard)	1

=== Year-end charts ===
Chart (2018)	Position
Australian Vinyl Albums (ARIA)	65
Belgian Albums (Ultratop Flanders)	70
Belgian Albums (Ultratop Wallonia)	137
Hungarian Albums (MAHASZ)	82
Mexican Albums (Top 100 Mexico)	72
US Tastemakers Albums (Billboard)	4
US Top Alternative Albums (Billboard)	30
US Top Rock Albums (Billboard)	57

== Certifications ==
Region	Certification	Certified units/sales
United Kingdom (BPI)	Silver	60,000^{‡}
^{‡} Sales+streaming figures based on certification alone.
