= Waldo, Kansas City =

Neighborhood in Kansas City, Missouri, U.S.

Waldo
- Neighborhood
- Interactive map of Waldo
- Coordinates: 38°59′19″N 94°35′25″W
- Country: United States
- State: Missouri
- County: Jackson
- ZIP codes: 64114, 64131
- Website: https://www.waldokc.org/

Waldo is a neighborhood located on the southside of Kansas City, Missouri, that has continued to maintain its own unique character, even though it was annexed by Kansas City in 1909. Waldo's boundaries are Gregory Boulevard on the north to 85th Street on the south, and Troost Avenue on the east to State Line on the west.

== History ==
In 1841, David Waldo of Gasconade County, Missouri, was convinced by some friends to purchase land in Jackson County, Missouri. Waldo purchased 1,000 acres (4.0 km^{2}) that ran from what is now Gregory to 91st Street and State Line to Holmes.

In 1860, a rail line was established between Westport and Dodson, and a main stop was located in Waldo. When the rail line was converted to street cars in 1907, a brick station was built at the Waldo location, and it became known as the Grand Central Station of Waldo. Waldo was annexed by Kansas City in 1909, which pushed the southern city limit from 49th Street to 77th Street. Business began to grow around the station, including Elmer Family Grocery and Milen Drygoods. As the growth continued, the Waldo area became a main traffic artery of south Kansas City. Houses on Wornall Road south to 75th Street made way for continued business expansion in the 1930s.

The Waldo Water Tower, located near 75th and Holmes, is a local landmark and is listed in the National Register of Historic Places. The Alexander Majors House is another local landmark listed in the National Register of Historic Places.

== Education ==
Waldo has a lending library, a branch of the Kansas City Public Library.

St. Elizabeth School is a parochial catholic school located in Waldo. It was founded in 1922, and serves students from pre-school through 8th grade.

Hale Cook Elementary is a Kansas City public school located in Waldo. It was founded in 1912 and closed in 2009, but reopened as a neighborhood school in 2014. It serves students from pre-school through 6th grade.

Kansas City Academy is an independent school serving students in 6th through 12th grade located in Waldo.

== See also ==
- List of neighborhoods in Kansas City, Missouri
