= Waldo Water Tower (Kansas City, Missouri) =

- U.S. National Register of Historic Places
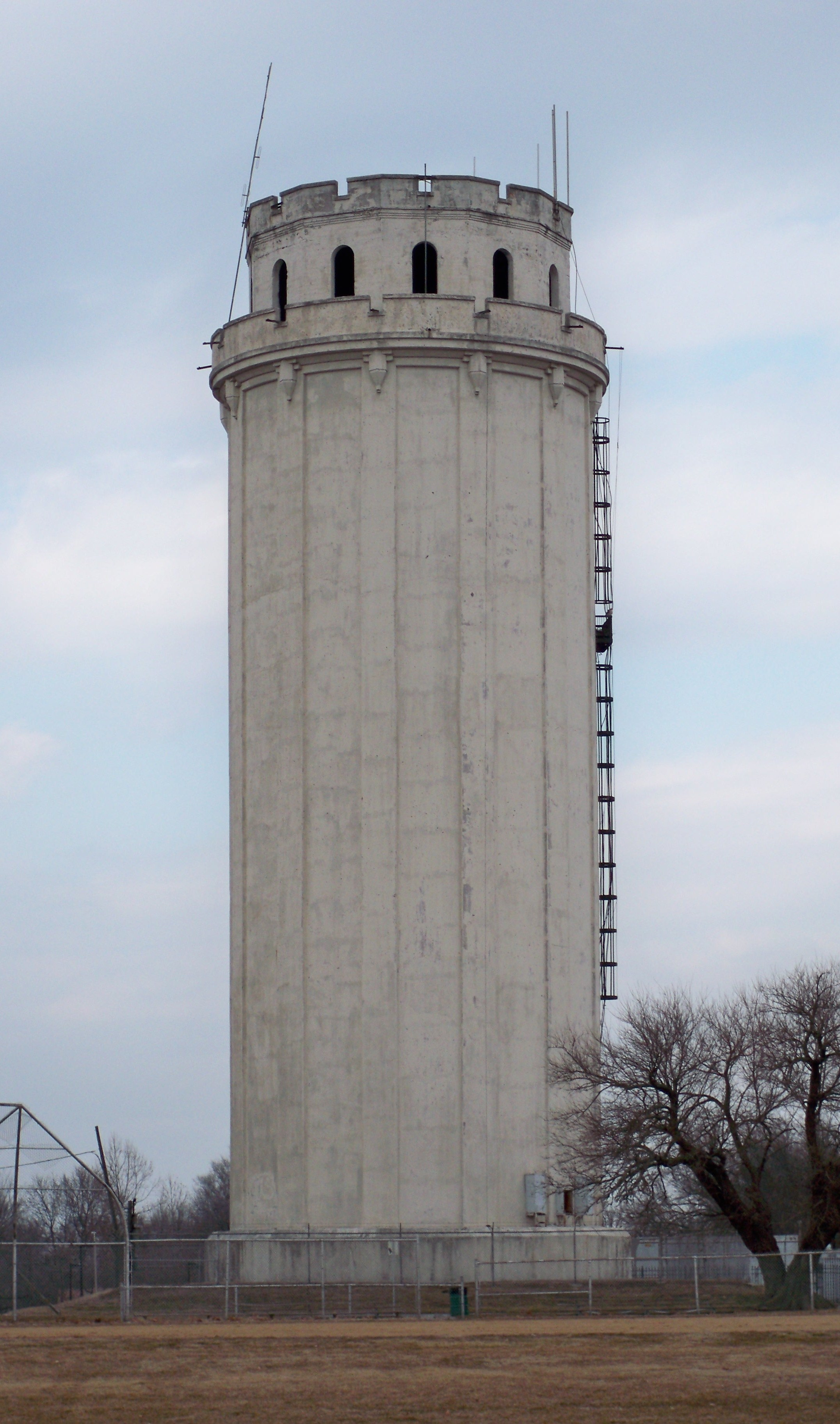
- Waldo Water Tower, March 2010

- Location within Missouri Location within the United States
- Location: 75th St. and Holmes Rd., Tower Park, Kansas City, Missouri
- Coordinates: 38°59′25″N 94°34′55″W
- Built: 1920
- Architect: Tifft Const. Co.
- NRHP reference No.: 77000810
- Added to NRHP: April 18, 1977

The Waldo water tower, officially called the Frank T. Riley Memorial, is a white, castle-like tower in the Waldo neighborhood of south Kansas City, Missouri, United States.

== Description ==
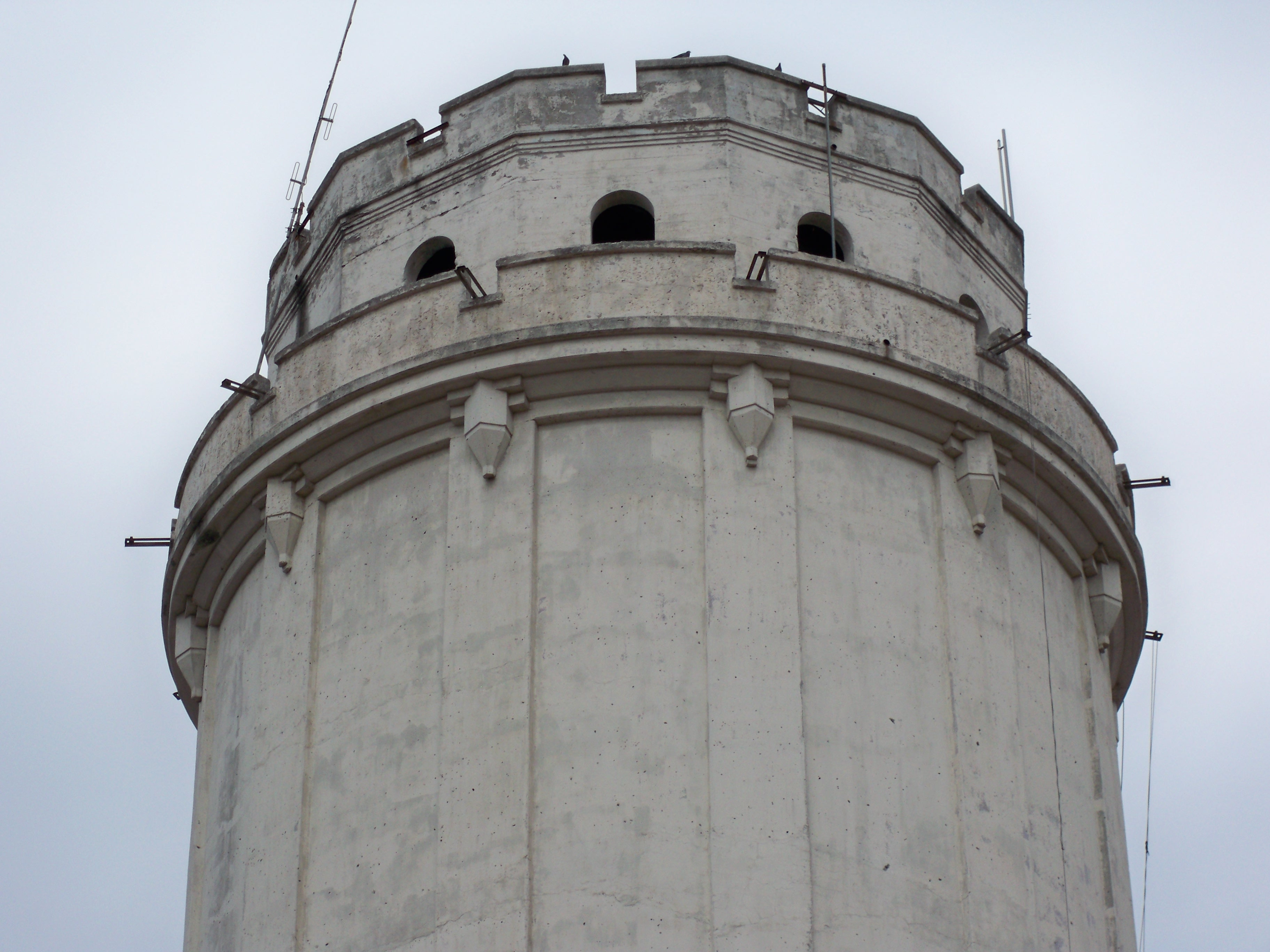
Closeup of the crenellated top, March 2010

The structure was a functioning water tower from 1920 until 1957. The tower was pictured each year from 1929 to 1946 in the World Book Encyclopedia as an early example of reinforced concrete. It was listed in 1975 as Missouri's first American Water Landmark by the American Water Works Association, and is on the National Register of Historic Places.

The 12-sided tower is 134 feet (41 m) tall, with walls 18 inches (460 mm) thick, and a capacity of 1,000,000 US gallons (3,800,000 L; 830,000 imp gal). The tower is topped by crenellations and 12 arched windows. It was constructed using a 14-day continuous pour.

In August 1962, the remains of a 20-year-old man missing since the previous November were discovered in the bottom of the tower. To retrieve the body, a hole was created near the bottom of the tower. The location of that hole is still visible on the west side of the tower. The tower is currently protected from vandals and climbers by a chain-link fence topped with barbed wire.

In 2015, the Kansas City Council set aside $850,000 to renovate the tower.

== See also ==
- National Register of Historic Places listings in Kansas City, Missouri
