= Kessler Apartments =

- U.S. National Register of Historic Places
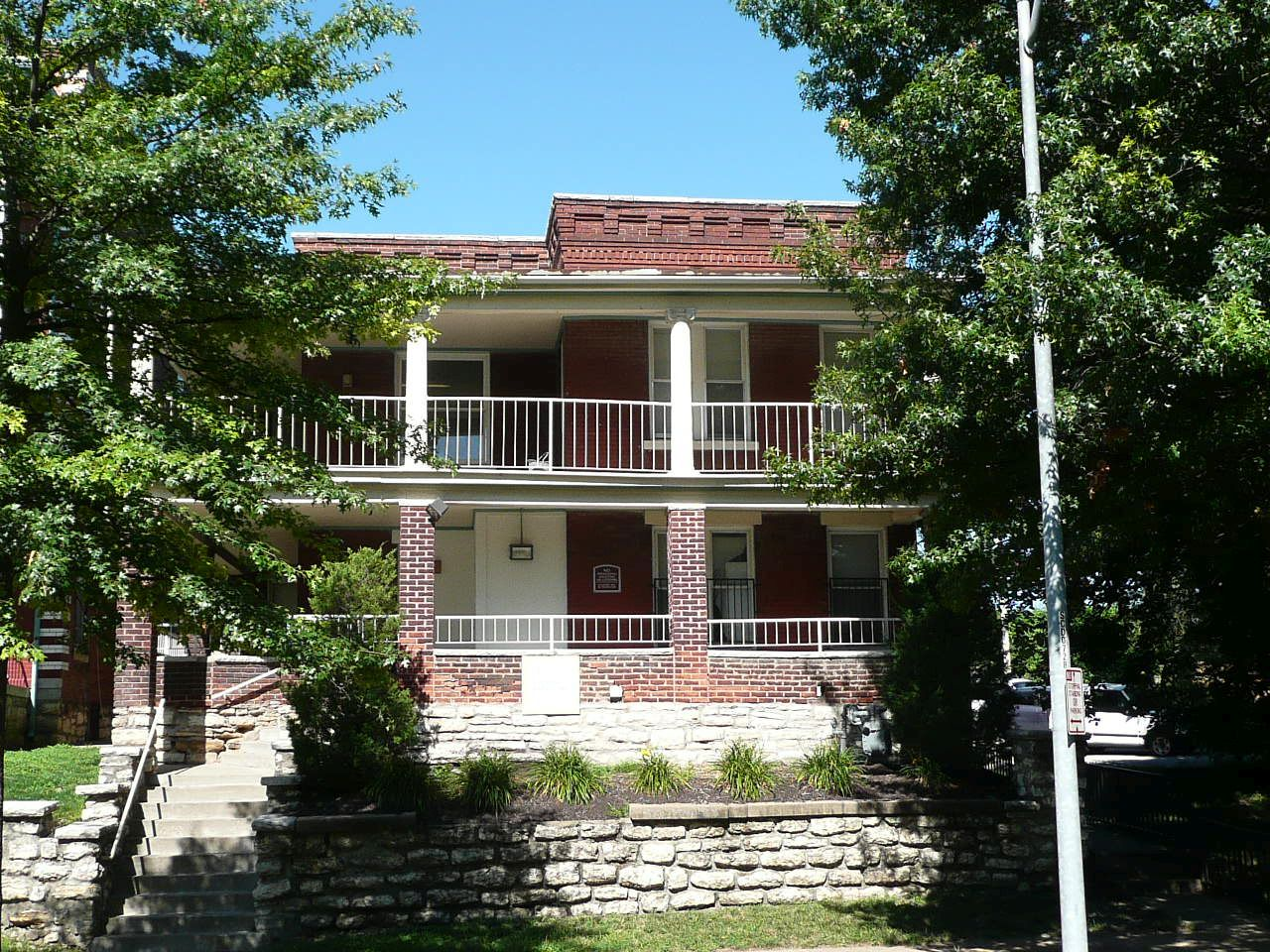
- The apartments in 2015

- Location within Missouri Location within the United States
- Location: 924 Paseo Blvd., Kansas City, Missouri
- Coordinates: 39°6′15″N 94°33′49″W
- Area: less than 1 acre (0.40 ha)
- Built: 1925
- MPS: Apartment Buildings on the North End of the Paseo Boulevard in Kansas City, Missouri MPS (64500814)
- NRHP reference No.: 02001202
- Added to NRHP: 22 October 2002

The Kessler Apartments in Kansas City, Missouri were built in 1925. They were listed on the National Register of Historic Places on October 22, 2002 as part of a group of buildings on the north end of Paseo Boulevard.

== See also ==
- Historic preservation
- National Register of Historic Places listings in Jackson County, Missouri: Kansas City other
