= National Register of Historic Places listings in Kansas City, Missouri =

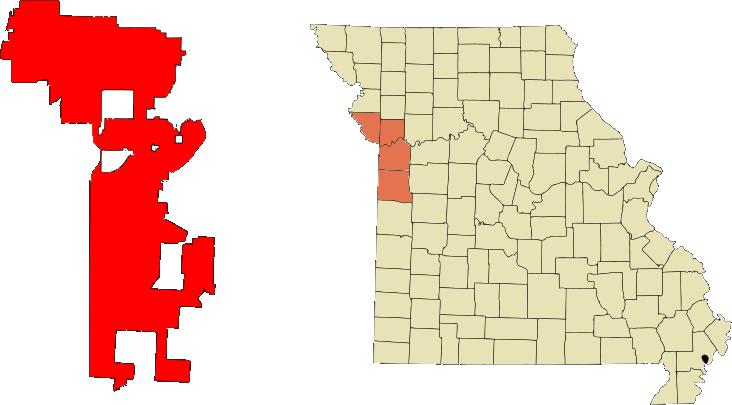
Location of Kansas City in Missouri

This is a list of the National Register of Historic Places listings in Kansas City, Missouri.

This is intended to be a complete list of the properties and districts on the National Register of Historic Places in the Jackson County portions of Kansas City, Missouri, United States. Latitude and longitude coordinates are provided for many National Register properties and districts; these locations may be seen together in an online map.

There are 388 properties and districts listed on the National Register in Jackson County, including 4 National Historic Landmarks. The portion of the city of Kansas City in Jackson County is the location of 336 of these properties and districts; they are listed here, while the remaining properties and districts, including all of the National Historic Landmarks, are listed separately. There are five properties in Kansas City outside of Jackson County which appear on lists for their respective counties, while all of the properties and districts in the administratively separate Kansas City, Kansas appear on the list for Wyandotte County, Kansas.

This National Park Service list is complete through NPS recent listings posted October 16, 2026.

== Number of listings by region ==
Approximately half of Kansas City's properties and districts are located in the downtown, which for the purposes of this list is defined as being roughly bounded by the Missouri River to the north, 31st Street to the south, Troost Avenue to the east, and State Line Road to the west.

	Region	# of Sites
1	Downtown	151
2	Remaining portions in Jackson County	186
3	Portions in Clay County	3
4	Portions in Platte County	2
5	Duplicates	(1)
Total:		341

== See also ==
- List of National Historic Landmarks in Missouri
- National Register of Historic Places listings in Missouri
