= Mineral Hall =

Historic house in Missouri, United States

- U.S. National Register of Historic Places
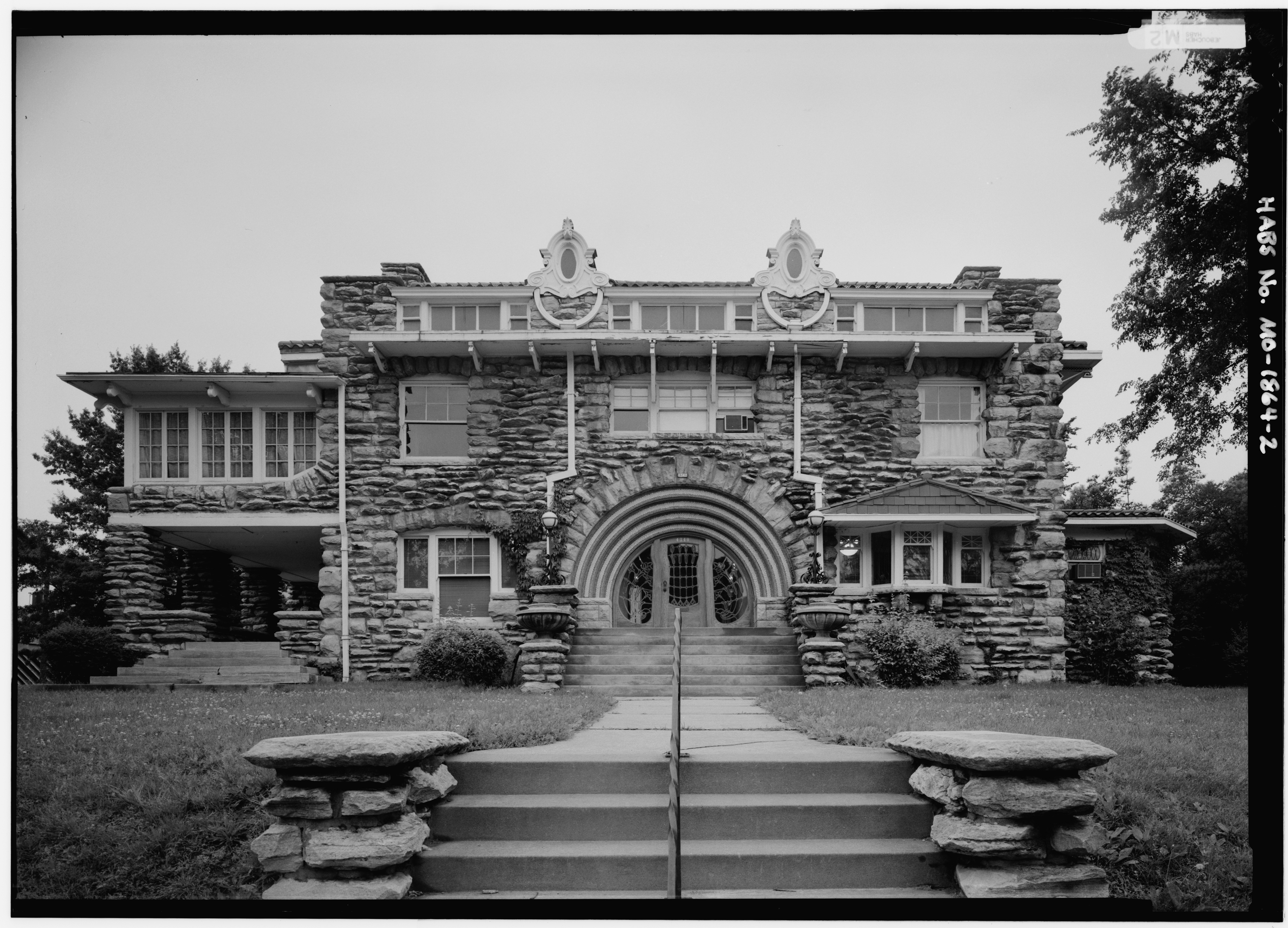
- Facade of Mineral Hall in 1988

- Location within Missouri Location within the United States
- Location: 4340 Oak St., Kansas City, Missouri
- Coordinates: 39°2′51″N 94°34′55″W
- Built: 1903
- Built by: Henry H. Johnson
- Architect: Louis S. Curtiss
- Architectural style: Prairie School
- NRHP reference No.: 76001112
- Added to NRHP: 12 July 1976

Mineral Hall in Kansas City, Missouri is a historic building constructed in 1903. An elaborate example of Prairie School architecture by Louis Singleton Curtiss, it originally served as a residence.

== Description ==
The building is located in the residential/mixed South Hyde Park neighborhood of Kansas City. Designed by noted architect Louis S. Curtiss it reflects a Prairie School practice of combining Second Empire, Art Nouveau and Neoclassical architectural elements. The building is asymmetrical yet almost rectangular with projecting bays on the north, south, west and northwest. The three-story structure is above grade on a full basement with approximate maximum dimensions of 75 by 55 feet (23 by 17 m). The foundation is uncoursed large block and the primary wall material is rock faced Jackson County limestone with a random pattern. The facade is the east side and fronts Oak Street. Features of the facade include a stone veranda and the central main entrance which is approached by seven wide stone steps. The entry arch is ornamented as is the stairway and approach.

== History ==
Built in fourteen months from 1903 to 1904 at a cost of US$25,000 (equivalent to $895,833 in 2025), Mineral Hall was the residence of Roland E. Bruner. He bought the building in 1905 after it had been built for William A. Rule. It was a second home in the city for Rule and he never occupied it having had it built "to maintain the quality of the neighborhood". The building and the addition on the north built the next year are important examples of the work of Kansas City architect Louis S. Curtiss. Born in Canada, Curtiss was a notable architect in Kansas City. Construction was supervised by local stone contractor Henry H. Johnson. The building was donated to the Kansas City Art Institute in 1968. It was listed on the National Register of Historic Places on July 12, 1976.

== Photo gallery ==
Photographs of Mineral Hall
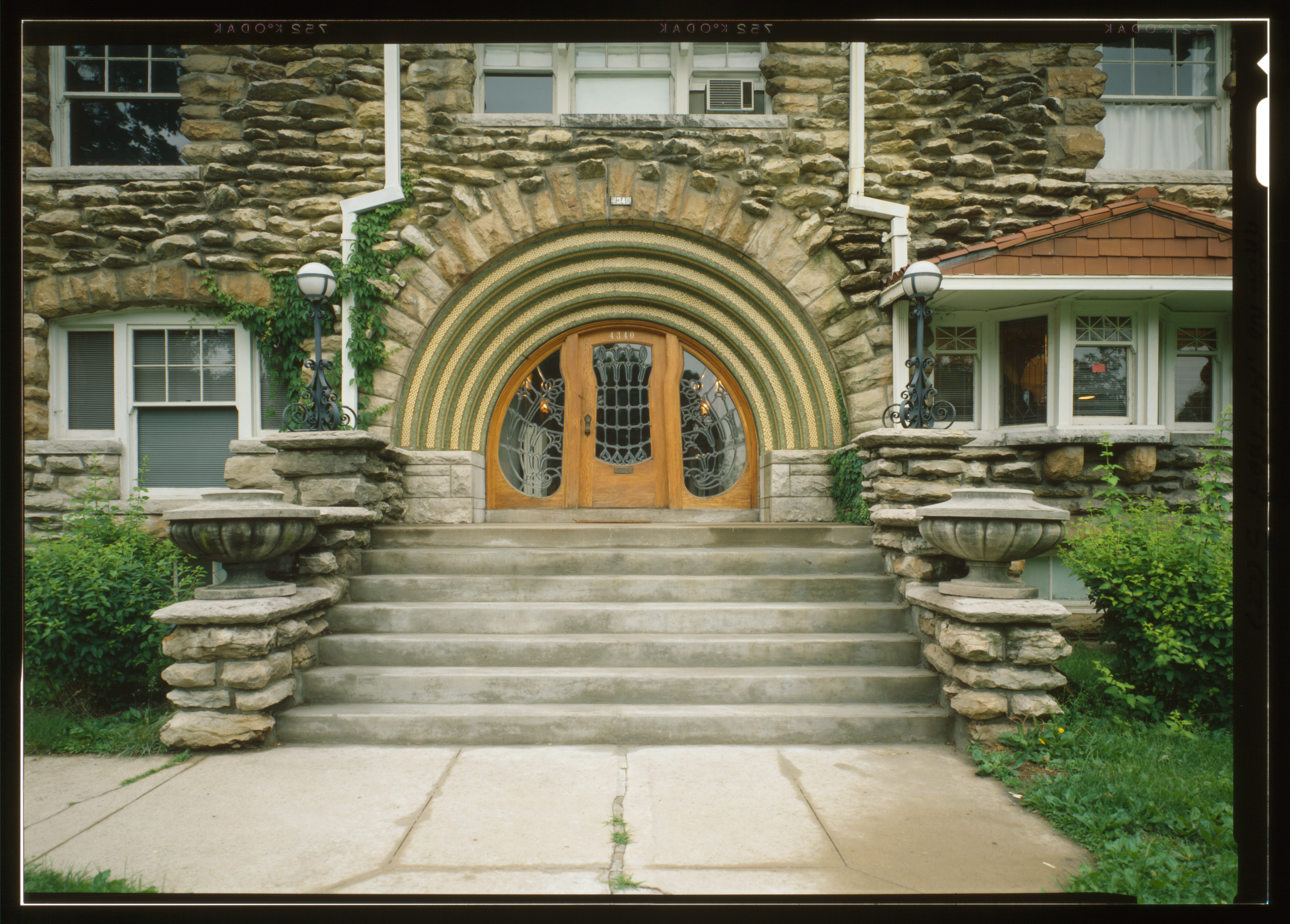
Detail of main entrance (1988)

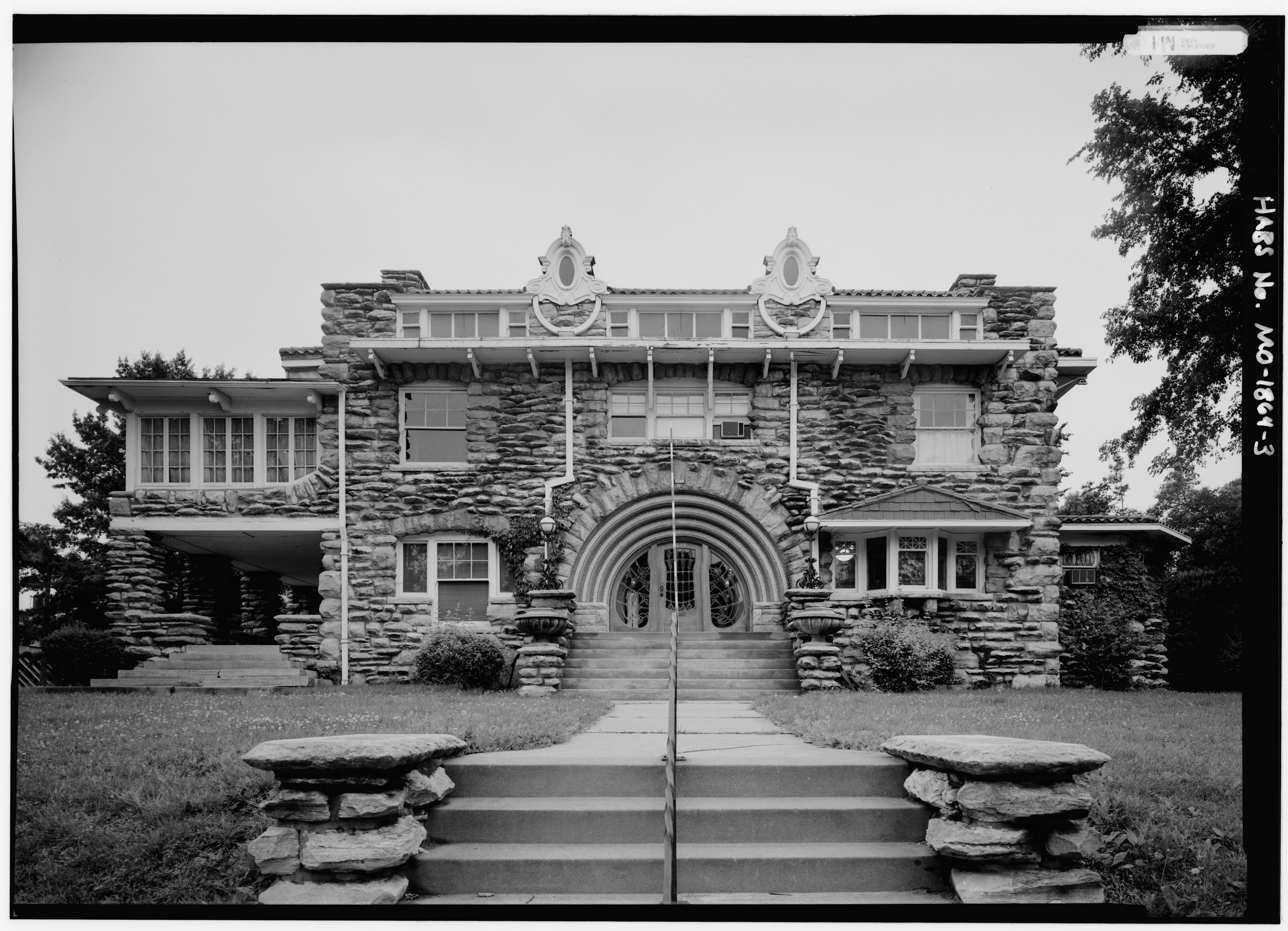
Facade, east elevation with scale rod (1988)

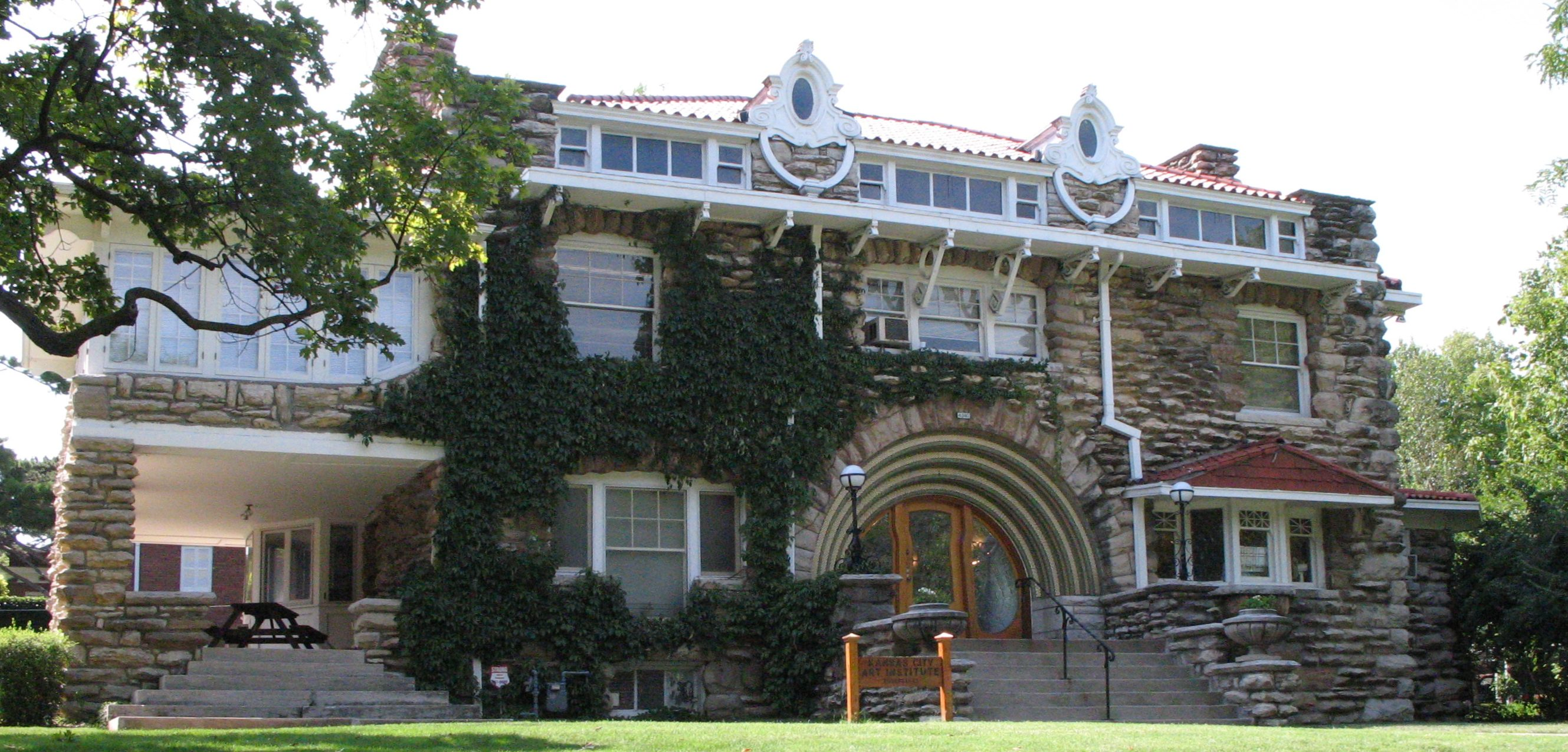
Mineral Hall at Kansas City Art Institute (2006)

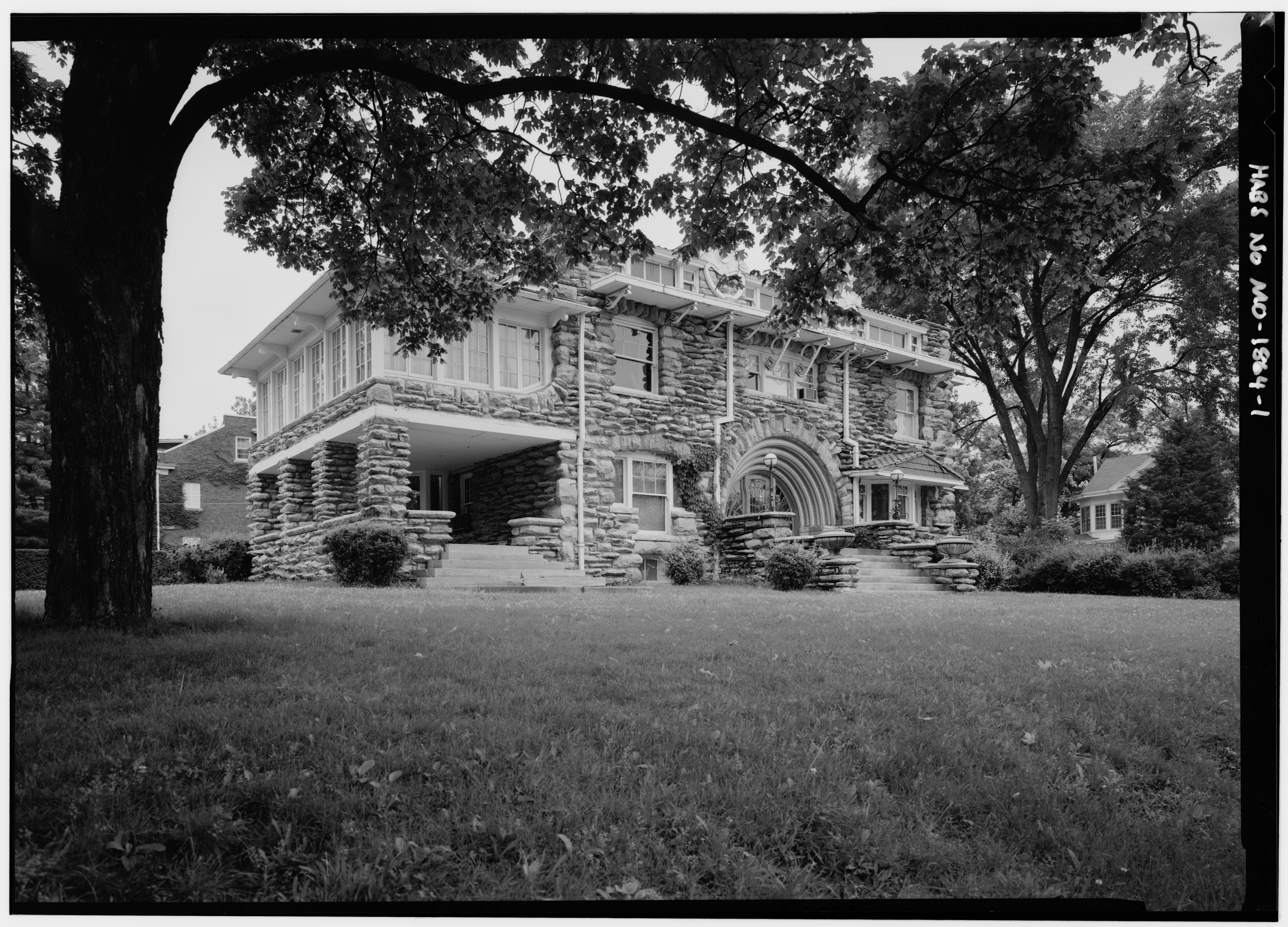
Facade from southeast (1988)
Photography: Jack Boucher (1988) for HABS; Commons (2006)

== See also ==
- Historic preservation
- Mineralogy
- National Register of Historic Places listings in Jackson County, Missouri: Kansas City other
- Stonemasonry
