= 85th and Manchester "Three Trails" Trail Segment =

Historic trail segment in Missouri, US

- U.S. National Register of Historic Places
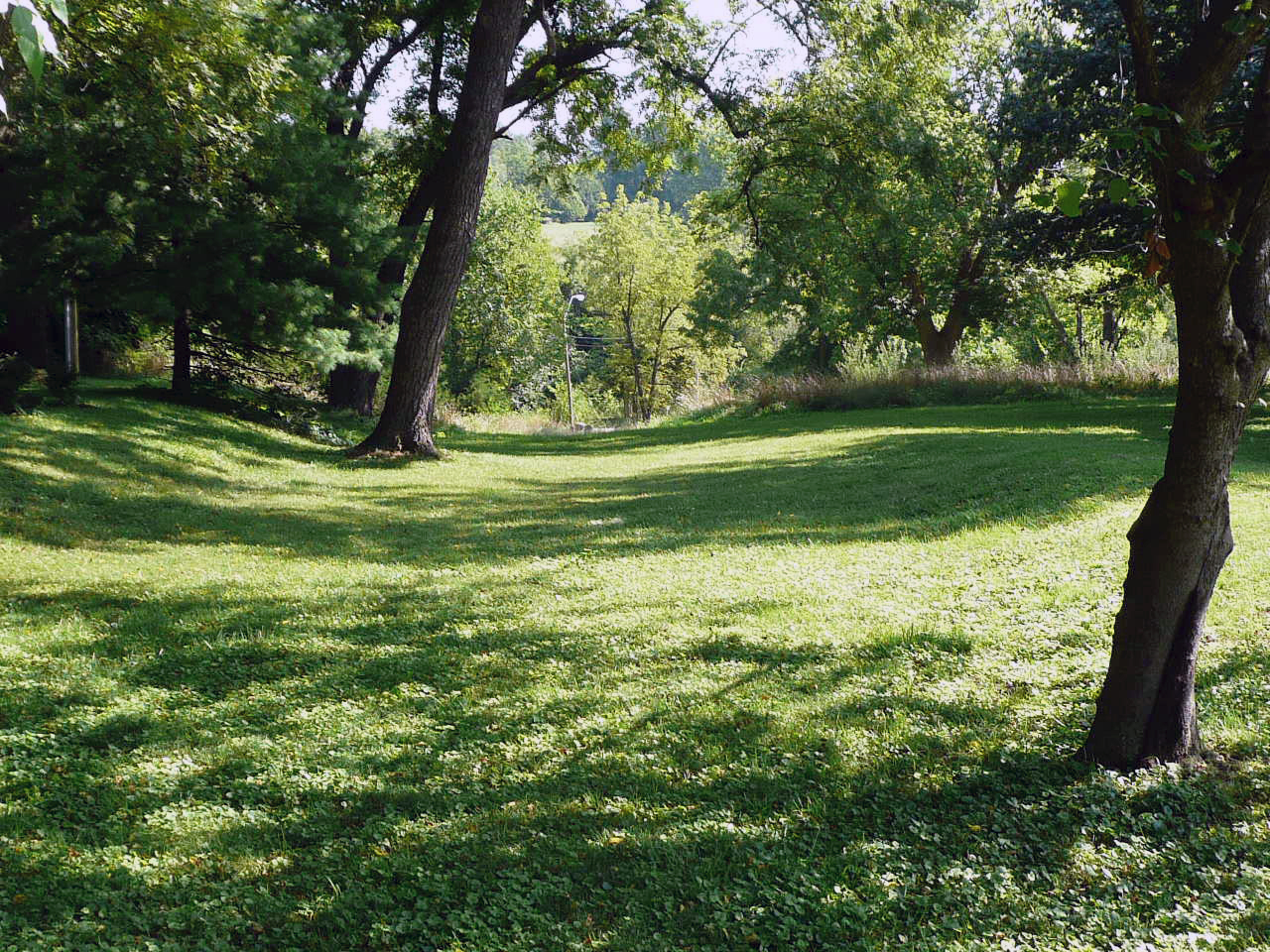

- Location within Missouri Location within the United States
- Location: Northwestern corner of the junction of 85th and Manchester, Kansas City, Missouri
- Coordinates: 38°58′13″N 94°29′55″W
- Area: 1.22 acres (0.49 ha)
- MPS: Santa Fe Trail MPS
- NRHP reference No.: 12000525
- Added to NRHP: August 22, 2012

85th and Manchester "Three Trails" Trail Segment is a historic Santa Fe Trail segment located at Kansas City, Missouri, United States. The segment is a deep and wide swale that diverges around a natural rock outcrop and measures approximately 390 feet (120 m) long. The segment may have been on the route of the original Santa Fe trading expedition led by William Becknell in 1821.

It was added to the National Register of Historic Places in 2012.
