= Maine Apartments =

- U.S. National Register of Historic Places
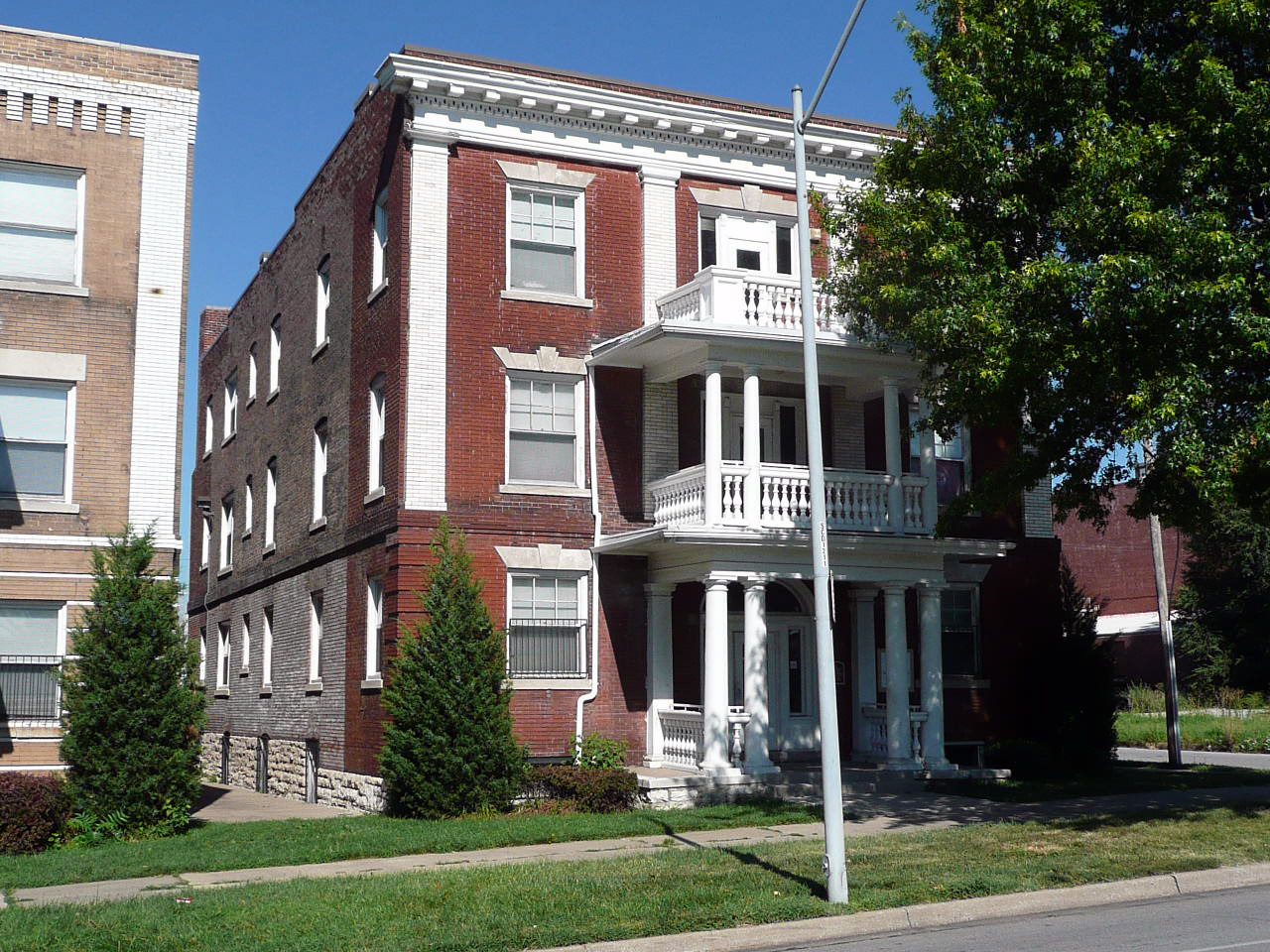

- Location within Missouri Location within the United States
- Location: 1300 Paseo Blvd., Kansas City, Missouri
- Coordinates: 39°5′59″N 94°33′53″W
- Area: less than one acre
- Built: 1901
- Architect: Davis, Walter M.
- Architectural style: Apartment building
- MPS: Apartment Buildings on the North End of the Paseo Boulevard in Kansas City, Missouri MPS
- NRHP reference No.: 02001198
- Added to NRHP: October 22, 2002

The Maine Apartments in Kansas City, Missouri are buildings from 1901. They are listed on the National Register of Historic Places as of 2002.
