= West Plaza =

Neighborhood in Kansas City, Missouri, United States

Coordinates: 39°02′34″N 94°36′09″W

West Plaza is a neighborhood in Kansas City, Missouri, that was originally constructed to be a working class area, but in the more than a century since has transformed and now contains the 45th (and State Line) Antique and Art District.

It is urban neighborhood comprising small single-family housing and small apartment buildings constructed on small lots for working-class people, storefront businesses, and a few large homes built for the wealthy of Westport.

== History ==
=== Early history ===
The larger homes date from the 1800s, with the smaller stock dating from before World War 1. There were no utilities, neither gas nor water, when the small working-class housing stock was built, and the homes began as single-storey buildings mounted on brick piers with crawlspaces underneath. They had three rooms: living room in front, kitchen, and bedroom in back. There were no bathrooms, and heating was solely provided by the wood-burning stove in the kitchen used for cooking. In the 1940s, as services improved, many homes had a second story added, alongside indoor bathrooms.

The streets are steep and narrow. The stone wall lining is utilitarian rather than decorative, as several streets, when utilities and sewers were installed after the War, were leveled and the walls used to shore them up.

The 45th Street area features a cluster of antique and houseware stores, containing shops such as the Myriad House Coffeehouse and Vintage Shop (Note: at 4448 Bell Street) opened in 2014, the Knotty Rug Company, European Express, and Morning Glory Antiques; but it was originally a neighborhood shopping area with, a drugstore, bakery, butchers, and Philip's Market. (Note: at 1813 West 45th Street.) In the 1920s, a streetcar line looped along 45th Street and State Line Road.

=== Current ===
With the decline in local businesses caused by the advent of automobiles, the area has become the Forty-Fifth Street Antique and Art District. By the mid-1990s, there were already more than 50 antiques, arts, and crafts dealers in the district.

== See also ==
- List of neighborhoods in Kansas City, Missouri
