= Parade Park Maintenance Building =

- U.S. National Register of Historic Places
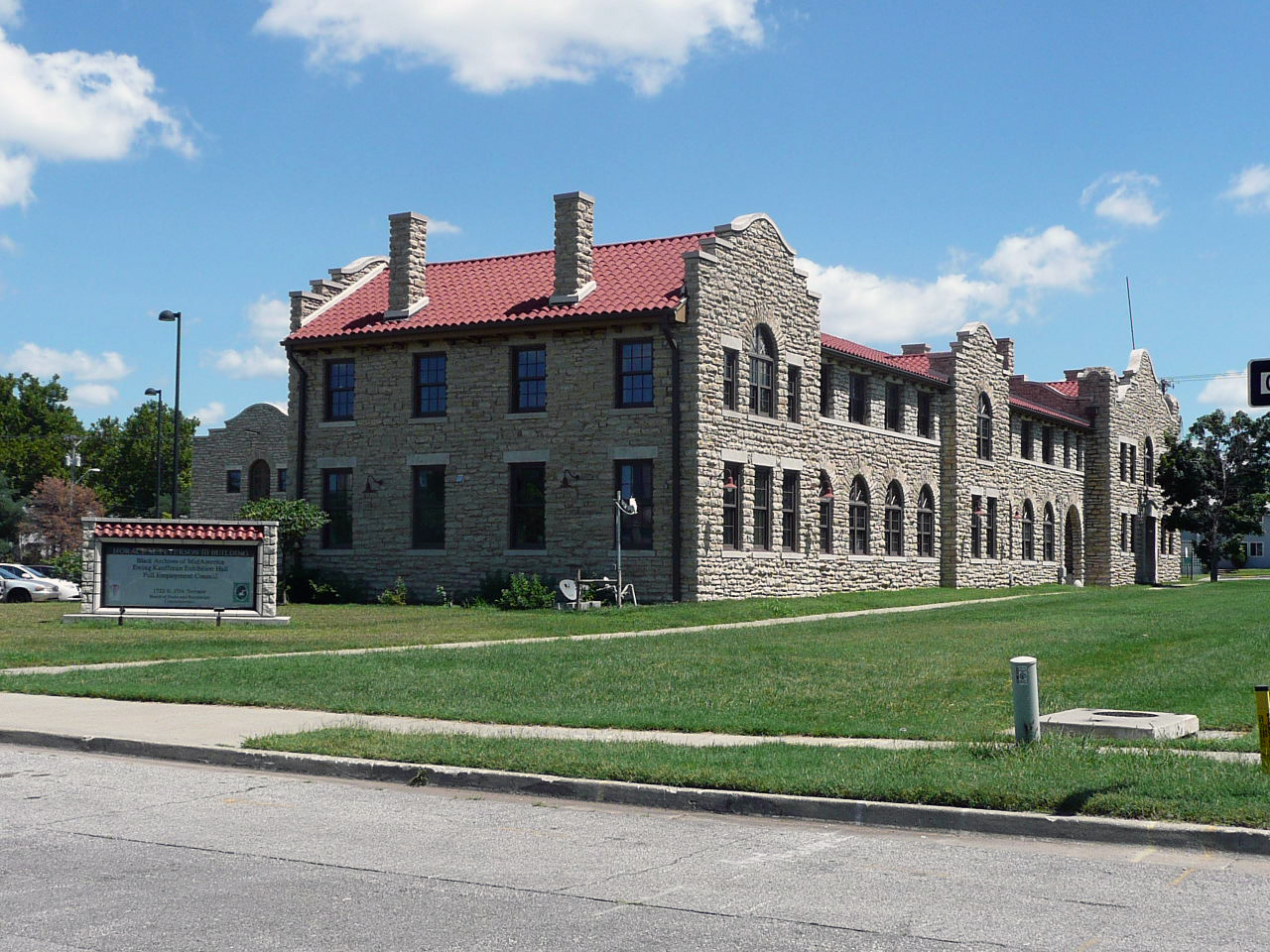

- Location within Missouri Location within the United States
- Location: 1722 Woodland Ave., Kansas City, Missouri
- Coordinates: 39.09216°N 94.56119°W
- Area: 2.4 acres (0.97 ha)
- Built: 1912
- Architect: Sparks, Arthur L.
- Architectural style: Mission/Spanish Revival
- NRHP reference No.: 08000719
- Added to NRHP: July 24, 2008

The Parade Park Maintenance Building in Kansas City, Missouri is a building from 1912. It was listed on the National Register of Historic Places in 2008.
