= Kansas City Masonic Temple =

- U.S. National Register of Historic Places
- Location within Missouri Location within the United States
- Location: 903 Harrison St., Kansas City, Missouri
- Coordinates: 39°6′11″N 94°34′13″W
- Area: less than one acre
- Built: 1909
- Architect: Kuykendall, J.C.
- Architectural style: Classical Revival, Beaux Arts
- NRHP reference No.: 80002365
- Added to NRHP: November 14, 1980

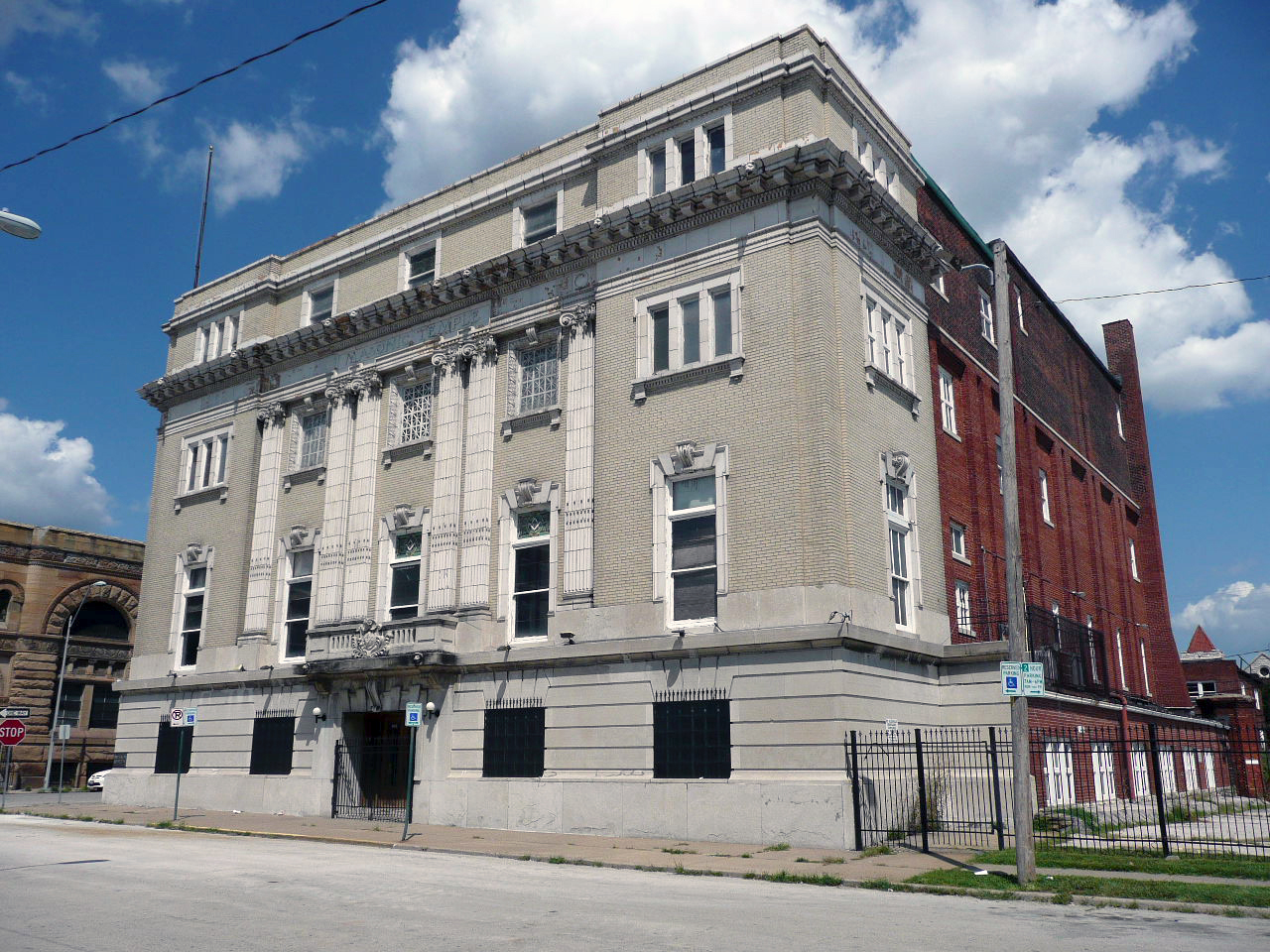

The Masonic Temple in Kansas City, Missouri is a Neo-Classical Architecture building in the Beaux-Arts architecture tradition. Designed by J.C. Sunderland, the Masonic Cornerstone was laid October 8, 1910 and the building held a public dedication ceremony on September 30, 1911.

Harry S. Truman and Bess Truman danced in the 6,600 square foot Tiffany Ballroom which prominently features plaster columns and an impressive Tiffany glass window array.

The Kansas City Masonic Temple was listed on the National Register of Historic Places in 1980 and as a film location with the Missouri Film Commission in 2013. A restoration project was launched in 2017 to restore and preserve the building for future generations.
