= Newbern Hotel =

Historic hotel in Kansas City, Missouri, United States

- U.S. National Register of Historic Places
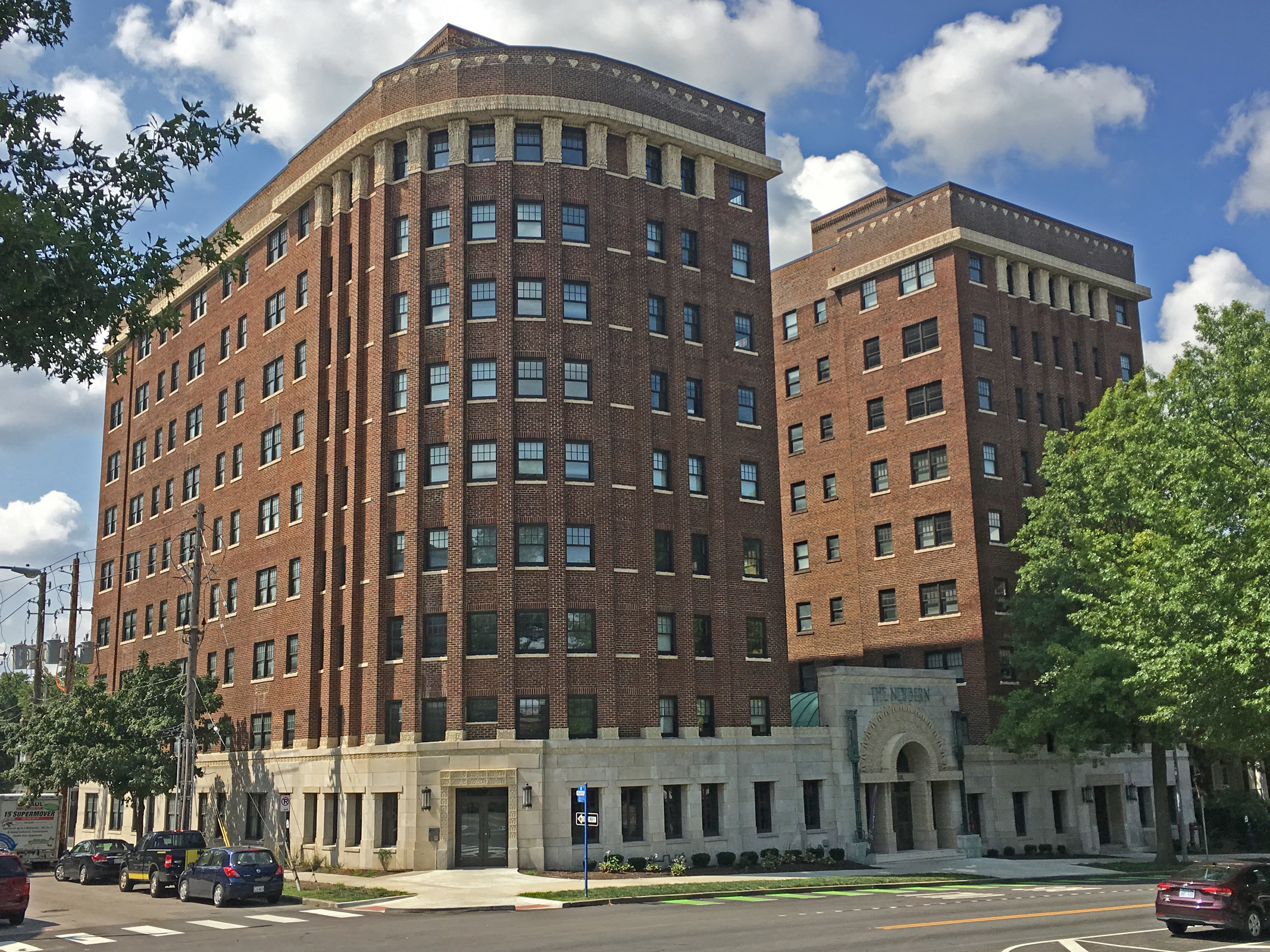
- Newbern Apartments northeast entry in 2018

- Location within Missouri Location within the United States
- Location: 525 East Armour Boulevard; Kansas City, Missouri; United States
- Coordinates: 39°3′48″N 94°34′43″W
- Area: less than 1 acre (0.40 ha)
- Built: 1921–1923
- Built by: C.O. Jones, Armour Building Co.
- Architect: Ernest O. Brostrom
- Architectural style: Sullivanesque
- NRHP reference No.: 80002367
- Added to NRHP: 23 September 1980

The Newbern Hotel is a historic hotel/apartment building in Kansas City, Missouri, United States, that is listed on the National Register of Historic Places (NRHP).

== Description ==
Located at 525 East Armour Boulevard, the hotel is set back from the sidewalk about 6 feet (1.8 m) and surrounded by a grass border with some small shrubs the buildings occupy a prominent position at the intersection of Armour Boulevard and Cherry Street. The building consists of two basically rectangular nine story towers bridged by a one-story barrel vaulted hall giving the overall plan a U shape. One of the towers has a curved corner on the northeast, towards the intersection. Designed by Ernest O. Brostrom it displays Sullivaneque architectural style. Built from 1921 to 1923 by J.O. Jones of the Armour Building Company, the intended name was "Le Pavonien" but the initial name was the Peacock Hotel. It was renamed the Newbern Hotel in 1925 when Beine H. Hopkins bought the property. It was listed on the NRHP on September 23, 1980.

== See also ==
- National Register of Historic Places listings in Jackson County, Missouri: Kansas City other
- Historic preservation
