= Volker, Kansas City =

Neighborhood of Kansas City, Missouri, U.S.

Coordinates: 39.044°N 94.581°W

Volker is a historic neighborhood in Kansas City, MO that lies just northwest of the Westport historic and entertainment district. The 39th Street West District and the Old Westport Shopping Center lie within the Volker neighborhood. The boundaries of the Volker Neighborhood are 31st Street on the north and Westport Road/43rd Street on the south. The western boundary is State Line Road. On the east, the boundaries are Roanoke Road on the north side of 39th and Southwest Trafficway south of 39th.

The area is named after one of its beloved former residents: William Volker, a German-born philanthropist who donated most of his fortune to the city and its poor.

== See also ==
- List of neighborhoods in Kansas City, Missouri
