= Washington-Wheatley, Kansas City =

Neighborhood of Kansas City, Missouri, U.S.

Coordinates: 39°05′03″N 94°32′40″W

Washington-Wheatley is a historic neighborhood in Kansas City, Missouri, United States. The neighborhood is located between 18th Street and 27th Street and Prospect Avenue to I-70.

It is mostly an African-American neighborhood on the East Side.
