= Raphael Hotel =

Hotel in Kansas City, Missouri

Coordinates: 39°02′23″N 94°35′29″W

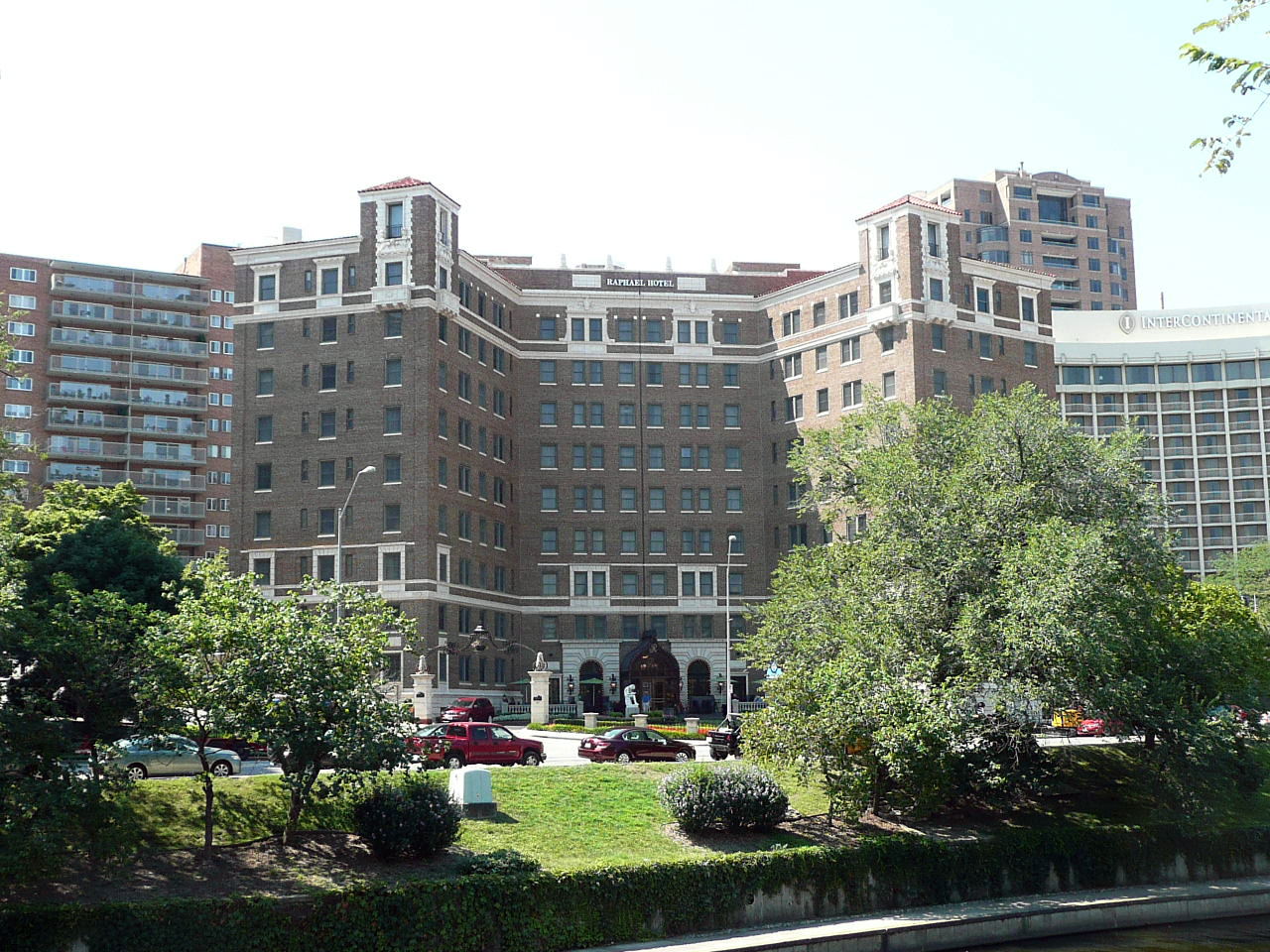
Raphael Hotel

The Raphael Hotel is a historic nine-story hotel located at 325 Ward Parkway in the Country Club Plaza district in Kansas City, Missouri. It is a locally significant landmark that originally opened in 1928 as Villa Serena Apartments, a block of luxury apartments. Its Italian Renaissance Revival style architecture was designed to complement the Spanish style of the nascent Country Club Plaza developed in the early 1920s.

In 1974, the J.C. Nichols Company purchased the structure, remodeled and re-opened it as The Raphael in 1975. The 126-room hotel is patterned after small European hotels. The property is a member of the Historic Hotels of America since 2001 and was listed in the National Register of Historic Places in 2009. Raphael Hotel is affiliated with the Marriott Autograph Collection. As of 2017, Raphael hotel had a restaurant named Chaz.

== Bibliography ==
- Van Luchene, Katie (2008). Insiders' Guide to Kansas City (3d ed.). Globe Pequot Press. p. 40. ISBN 978-0-7627-4554-8.
