= List of museums in Kansas City, Missouri =

This list of museums in Kansas City, Missouri encompasses museums which are defined for this context as institutions (including non-profit organizations, government entities, and private businesses) that collect and care for objects of cultural, artistic, scientific, or historical interest and make their collections or related exhibits available for public viewing. Also included are non-profit and university art galleries.

== Museums ==
Name	Neighborhood	Type	Summary
American Jazz Museum	18th and Vine	Music	History of jazz music, located in the same building as the Negro Leagues Baseball Museum
American Royal Museum	Greater Downtown	Agriculture	Open by appointment, exhibits about horse and livestock shows, rodeos and agriculture
Arabia Steamboat Museum	River Market	Museum ship	Recovered mid-19th-century side wheeler steamboat and artifacts
Battle of Westport Museum & Visitor Center	South Kansas City	History	website, located in Swope Park, history of the Battle of Westport
Belger Arts Center	Crossroads	Art	Features a fine art collection and also holds exhibitions of art in various media
Black Archives of Mid-America	18th and Vine	History	website, features permanent exhibit about the story of African Americans in the Kansas City
Bruce R. Watkins Cultural Heritage Center	East Side	African American	Legacy of Kansas City's early African-American pioneers, artistic, cultural and social history of the African-American experience
College Basketball Experience	Downtown	Sports	Includes the National Collegiate Basketball Hall of Fame, interactive history of men's college basketball in the United States
Greenlease Art Gallery	Plaza area	Art	Part of the Center for Arts and Letters at Rockhurst University
Hallmark Visitors Center	Greater Downtown	Commodity	website, exhibits of historic Hallmark cards, ornaments, art, collectibles and Hallmark Cards company history
Harris-Kearney House	Westport	Historic house	Operated by the Westport Historical Society, mid 19th-century Greek revival house
John Wornall House Museum	Brookside	Historic house	Pre-Civil War era house
Kansas Fire Brigade Museum	Downtown	Firefighting	Located in a historic fire station
Kansas City Garment District Museum	Downtown	History	Clothing, hats, photos of the period, period tools of the trade such as sewing machines, scissors and industrial fabric cutters
Kansas City Irish Center	Broadway Gillham	Ethnic	Irish and Irish-American community, culture, history, and heritage in the greater Kansas City area and region
Kansas City Museum	Northeast	Multiple	History, natural history, art
Kemper Museum of Contemporary Art	Southmoreland	Art	Works created after the 1913 Armory Show to works by present-day artists
Media Tech Museum	Crossroads	Media History	900+ artifacts spanning radio, film, and television history. website
Missouri Quilt Museum	North	Quilting and Sewing	World's Largest Spool of thread, over 1000 toy sewing machines, antique treadles, quilt galleries, anything and everything sewing related. www.missouriquiltmuseum.com Located in Hamilton, MO
The Money Museum	Greater Downtown	Numismatic	Exhibits on the Federal Reserve, nation's financial system, coin collections; operated by the Federal Reserve Bank of Kansas City
Museum of BBQ	Greater Downtown (Crown Center)	Food	website, various exhibits about barbecue
National Airline History Museum	Northeast	Aviation	Located at the Kansas City Downtown Airport, history of commercial aviation
National Museum of Toys and Miniatures	Plaza area	Toy	Classic toys and fine-scale miniatures (formerly the Toy and Miniature Museum of Kansas City)
National World War I Museum and Memorial	Greater Downtown	History	World War I artifacts in interactive displays
Negro Leagues Baseball Museum	18th and Vine	Sports	History of the Negro leagues, located in the same building as the American Jazz Museum
Nelson-Atkins Museum of Art	Southmoreland	Art	Collections include European paintings, Asian art, American paintings and photography
The Rabbit hOle	North Kansas City	Children's	website, Children's museum with immersive exhibits based on children's literature
Science City at Union Station	Greater Downtown	Science	Over 120 hands-on science exhibits, planetarium
Shoal Creek Living History Museum	Northland	Living	website, 19th-century Missouri life, over eighteen buildings and log cabins dated from the 1800s relocated from surrounding counties to create a small village setting, on 80 areas in Hodge Park
The Ginger House Museum	East	History	website, Birthplace of famed actress/dancer Ginger Rogers, restored to 1911 period [closed since 2019]
Thomas Hart Benton Home and Studio State Historic Site	Midtown-Westport	Biographical	Home and studio of artist Thomas Hart Benton
Trailside Center	South Kansas City	History	Exhibits memorabilia from the Battle of Westport and the Santa Fe, Oregon, and California trails.
United Federation of Doll Clubs Museum	Northeast	Doll	website, antique, vintage, and modern, play and artist dolls

== See also ==
- List of museums in Missouri
- List of museums in St. Louis
- List of points of interest in Kansas City, Missouri
