= Fire Station No. 11 (Kansas City, Missouri) =

Historic fire station in Kansas City, Missouri

Operational area
- Country: United States
- Address: 2033 Vine Street, Kansas City, Missouri (final)

Agency overview
- Established: 1890; 136 years ago
- Dissolved: 1977; 49 years ago
- Employees: 5 (founding)
- Fire chief: George C. Hale (founding)

Facilities and equipment
- Stations: 1 (historical)
- Engines: Hose truck, pumper

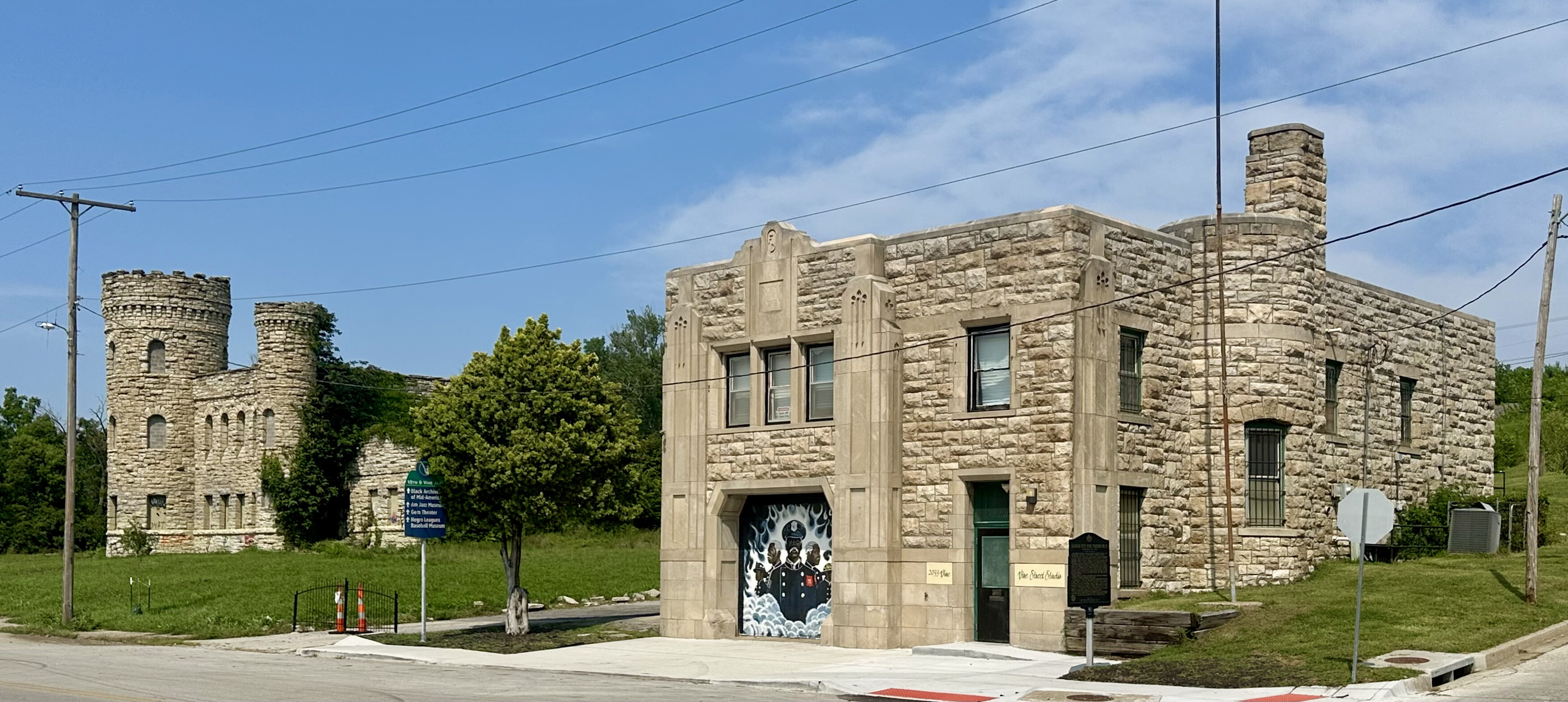
The historic city workhouse castle and Fire Station No. 11 are on Vine Street.

Fire Station No. 11 (originally Hose Company No. 11) was the first all-Black fire company in Kansas City, Missouri. The Kansas City Fire Department (KCFD) organized it in 1890. It is featured on the African American Heritage Trail, which notes that this fire station reflects the historic racial segregation of urban America. For nearly 90 years, it remained vital to the city's Black community, as a product of racially discriminatory municipal policy and as a source of employment and community pride. The station's history is linked to the evolution of Kansas City's racial geography, as its relocations followed the consolidation of the Black population into the 18th and Vine neighborhood. Since the city officially organized neighborhood boundaries in the 1990s, the modern Wendell Phillips neighborhood was formed around the station's final landmark building, leaving it a few blocks south of 18th and Vine.

The KCFD decommissioned the station in the late 1970s following the department's full integration. The building is listed on the Kansas City Register of Historic Places and houses the Vine Street Studio for artists. It neighbors the historic city workhouse castle, built 1897.

== History ==
=== Origin ===
Fire Station No. 11 was established during the Post-Reconstruction era's hardening racial segregation. In 1890, Kansas City Fire Chief George C. Hale received authorization to form Hose Company No. 11 as the KCFD's first all-Black fire company. "Hose Company" was the official KCFD designation for the unit of firefighters, and "Fire Station" is the physical building they occupied. This was a pragmatic administrative solution, not an act of progressive inclusion, that allowed the city to employ Black firefighters without violating the era's rigid racial hierarchy. The formation of a segregated company was consistent with the city's creation of other separate institutions for Black citizens, such as General Hospital No. 2.

The company's first captain was Edward S. Baker, who had become KCFD's first Black firefighter in 1887 and was promoted on July 3, 1890. He was joined by an initial crew that included Joseph Wheeler, Thomas H. Elliott, William P. Campbell, and Baker's son, William H. Baker, as watchboy. The company began operations in a temporary tent at the corner of Independence Avenue and Park Street. In November 1890, it moved into its first permanent building at 1309 Independence Avenue.

=== Relocation to 18th and Vine ===
In 1908, the KCFD relocated Fire Station No. 11, because of the city's intensifying racial segregation. Operations transferred from 1309 Independence Avenue to the pre-existing Engine House No. 10 at 1812 Vine Street, which was then re-designated as Station No. 11. This move placed the all-Black fire company in the center of the emerging Black community, which was being concentrated by racial redlining policies into the 18th and Vine neighborhood. The station became an institutional anchor in the area, which developed into a self-contained "city within a city" for the Black community. Its jobs were a significant example of the patronage awarded by Tom Pendergast's political machine.

The fire company modernized over time, transitioning from a horse-drawn apparatus to a motorized truck in 1917. It acquired a new Stutz pumper in 1926 capable of delivering 750 US gallons per minute (2,800 L/min). The 1812 Vine Street location was used until it was replaced in 1931, and it was demolished in 1967.

=== 2033 Vine Street landmark ===
Fire Station No. 11
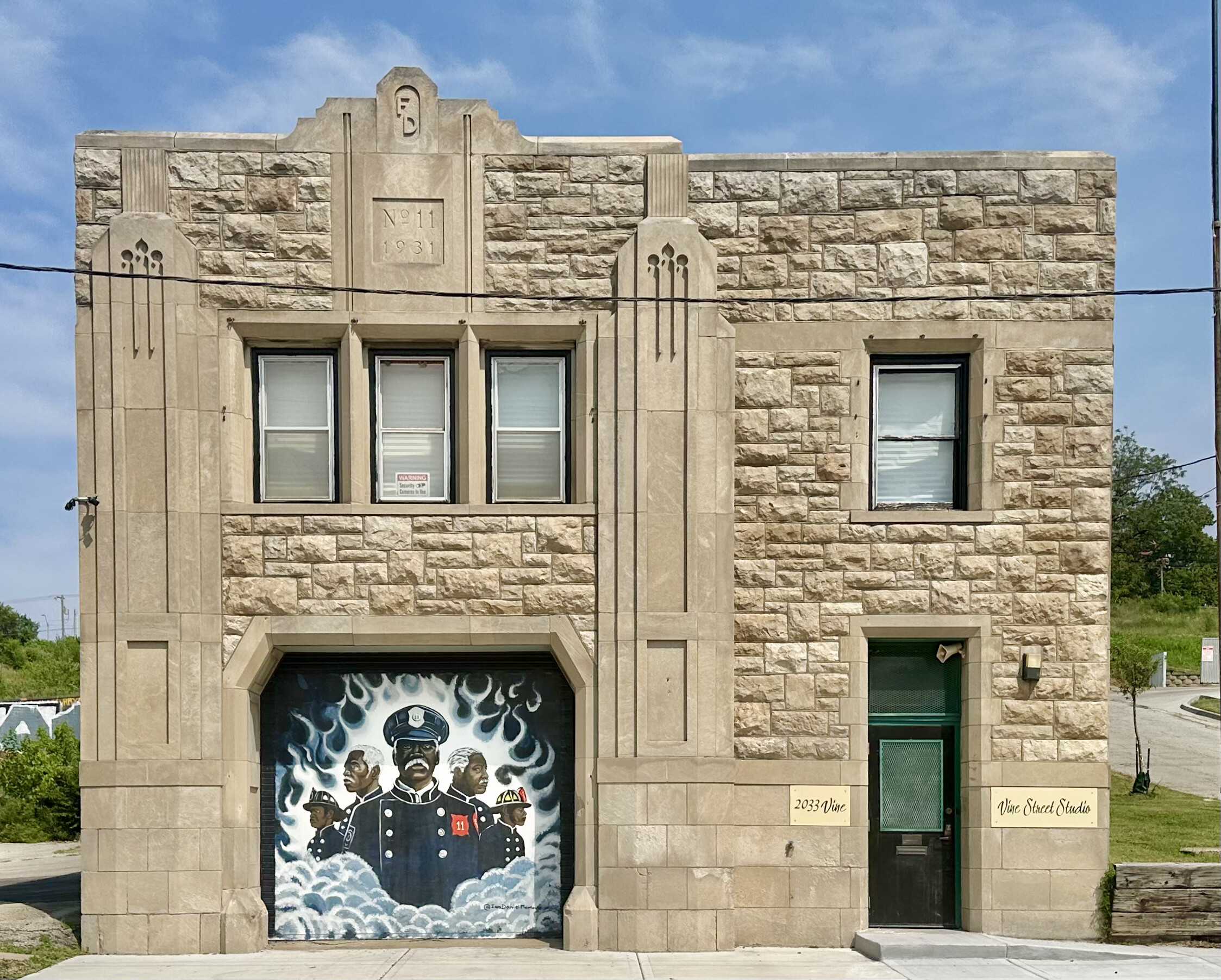
- The final station became an art studio at 2033 Vine Street.
- Interactive map of the Fire Station No. 11 area

General information
- Status: Closed, became an art studio
- Architectural style: Art Deco
- Location: Kansas City, Missouri, U.S.
- Coordinates: 39.0871°N 94.5637°W
- Completed: 1931
- Client: Kansas City Fire Department

Design and construction
- Architects: Robin A. Walker; James O'Connor (supervising)

On September 23, 1931, Fire Station No. 11 moved into its final and most historically significant building at 2033 Vine Street. The city had awarded the design contract to architect Robin A. Walker, with city architect James O'Connor supervising. The structure is a two-story, flat-roofed building with three bays, constructed with reinforced concrete and an exterior of limestone ashlar masonry. The building was constructed for US$20,500 (equivalent to $434,000 in 2025) next to the historic city workhouse castle jail, which had been built in 1897. As an Art Deco civic project of the Pendergast era, its design reflects the style of larger contemporary landmarks, characterized by native Bethany Falls limestone. The primary facade is distinguished by Art Deco details, including a stepped parapet, decorative geometric patterns in the limestone, and steel sash windows on the second floor.

At the station on May 22, 1941, firefighter Donald Lewis was killed in a vehicle collision, becoming the first Black KCFD firefighter to die in the line of duty. The station was a training ground for future leaders, including Raymond E. Daniel, who became KCFD's first Black Battalion Chief in 1960, and Edward E. Wilson Jr., who became KCFD's first Black Fire Chief. KCFD was formally racially integrated on May 5, 1958, making the station's original purpose obsolete. The facility was closed on May 1, 1976, as part of a citywide modernization.

== Legacy ==
After its closure, historian Horace M. Peterson III acquired the building to become the first permanent headquarters for the Black Archives of Mid-America. The Archives outgrew the location and relocated to the larger former Parade Park Maintenance Building in the 18th and Vine neighborhood. In 2015, the Gem Theater Cultural and Performing Arts Center, Inc., purchased 2033 Vine. It now houses the Vine Street Studio, a multi-disciplinary creative hub.

The building was listed on the Kansas City Register of Historic Places on April 4, 2009, and was listed on the National Register of Historic Places in 2026. It is a featured site on the African American Heritage Trail of Kansas City. Its history is preserved in the "Fire Station 11 Collection (AC105)" at the Black Archives of Mid-America, which contains its daily journals, logs, and photographs. In 2022, The Native Sons and Daughters of Greater Kansas City and the Greater Kansas City Fire Fighters Local 42 erected a historical marker at the site.
