= List of points of interest in Kansas City, Missouri =

Wiki list

The list includes businesses, museums, historical monuments, and theme parks.

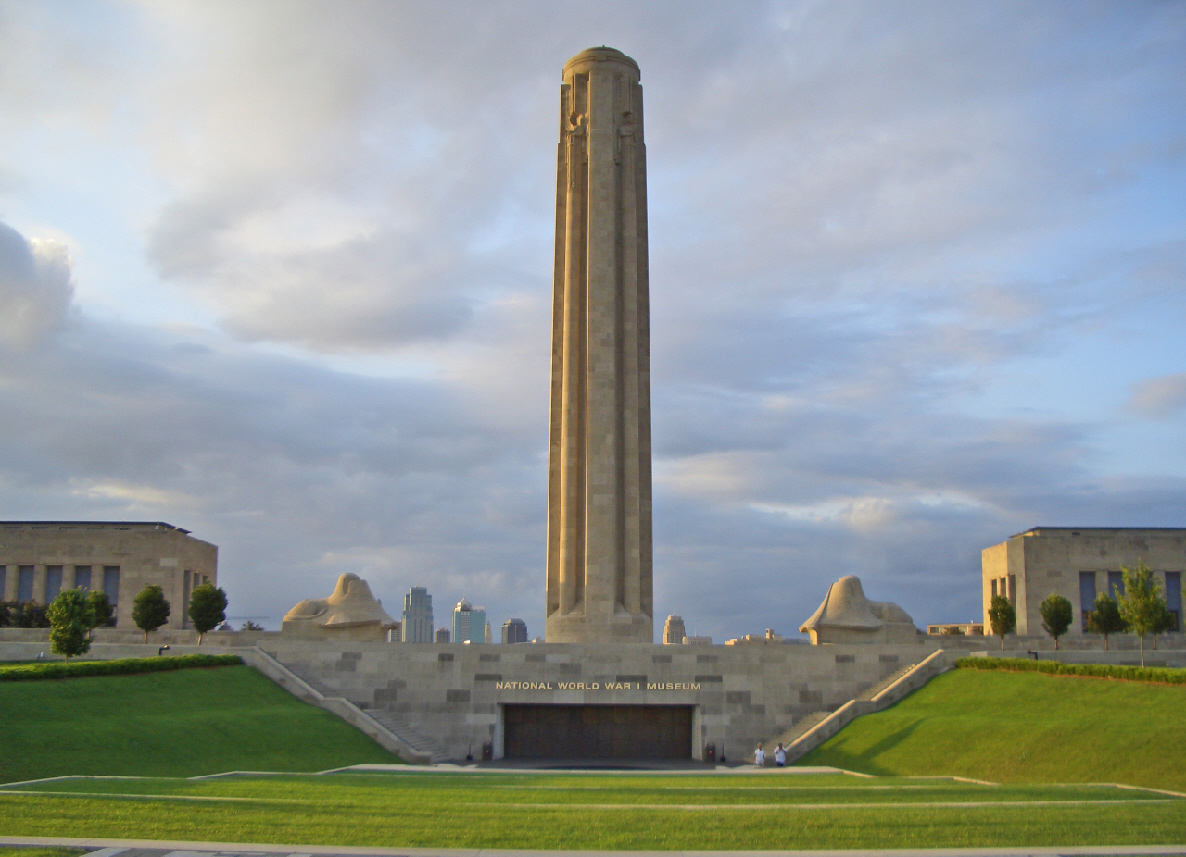
Liberty Memorial and National World War I Museum.

== Arts ==
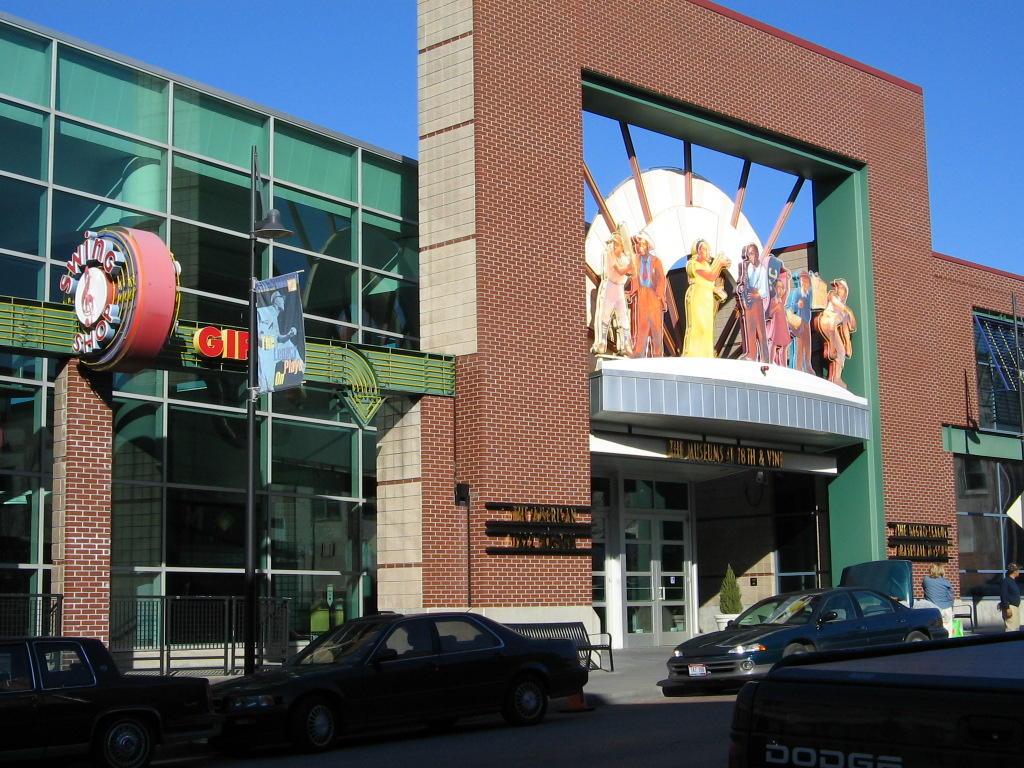
The building located in the historic 18th and Vine District houses the Negro Leagues Baseball Museum and the American Jazz Museum.

- American Jazz Museum, in the 18th and Vine
- Community Christian Church, designed by Frank Lloyd Wright with 1.2 billion candlepower "Spire of Light", on the Plaza.
- Crossroads Arts District, warehouse district with art galleries and restaurants.
- Laugh-O-Gram Studio, Walt Disney's original cartoon studio in Kansas City.
- Thomas Hart Benton Home and Studio State Historic Site, regionalist painter's residence.
- Nelson-Atkins Museum of Art, encyclopedic collection of art.

== Business ==
- Hallmark Cards Tour, company history and interactive displays at headquarters in Crown Center complex.
- Harley-Davidson factory, motorcycle manufacturer's Vehicle and Powertrain Operations plant
- Kansas City Board of Trade
- Boulevard Brewing Company Tour, manufacturing tour and beer tasting.

== Historical buildings ==
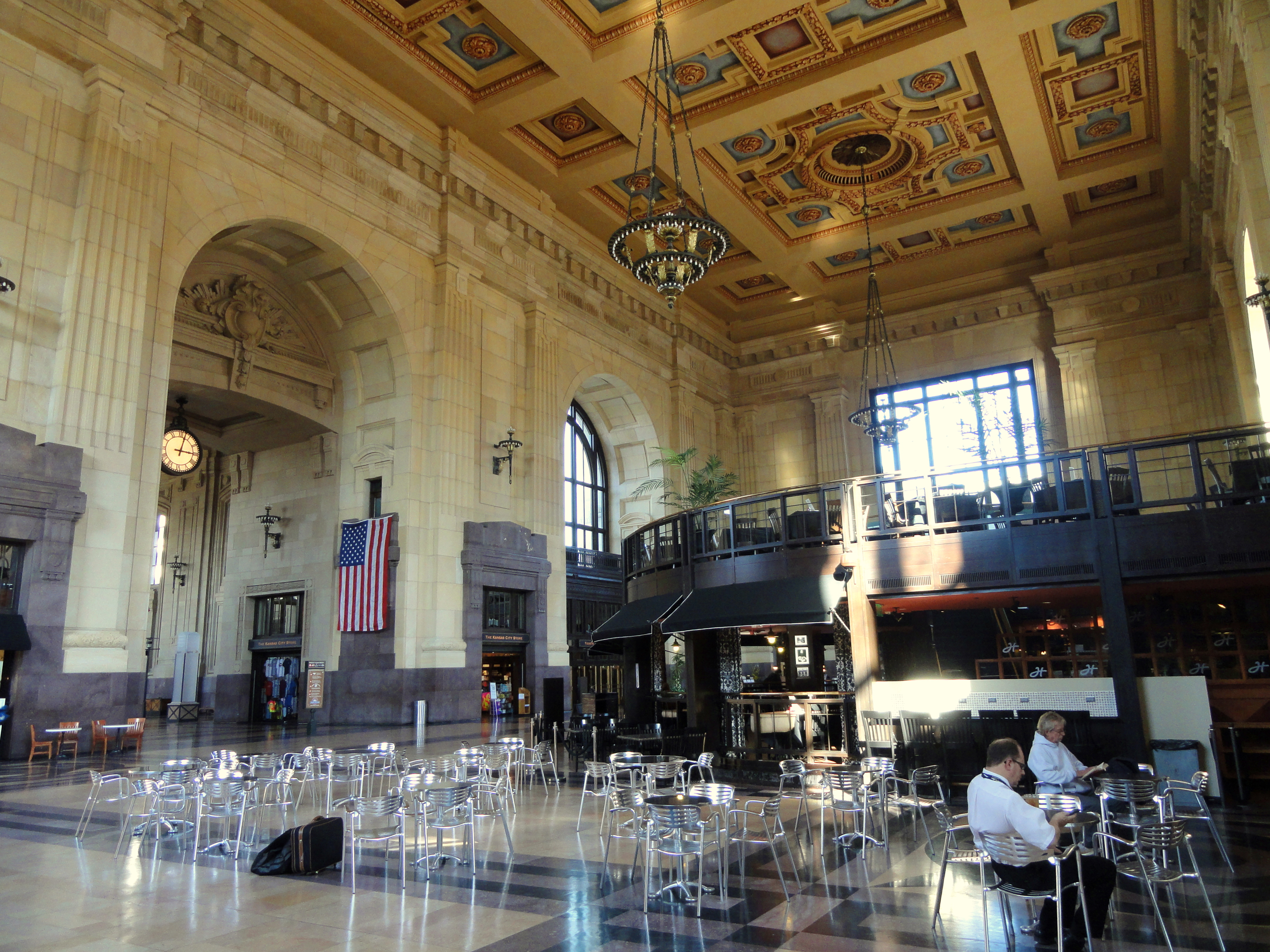
The Grand Hall of Union Station

- Science City at Union Station, interactive science center, Gottlieb Planetarium, City Extreme Screen theater, and exhibitions.
- Union Station, with restaurants, shopping, and special shows.
- Tiffany Castle, built 1909 for Flavel B. Tiffany who founded the Tiffany Springs neighborhood
- City workhouse castle, built 1897 as a city jail
- Sheraton Kansas City Hotel at Crown Center, formerly a Hyatt, site of the Hyatt Regency walkway collapse

== Memorials and landmarks ==
- Liberty Memorial, National World War I Museum, and Skywalk Memorial Plaza

== Museums ==
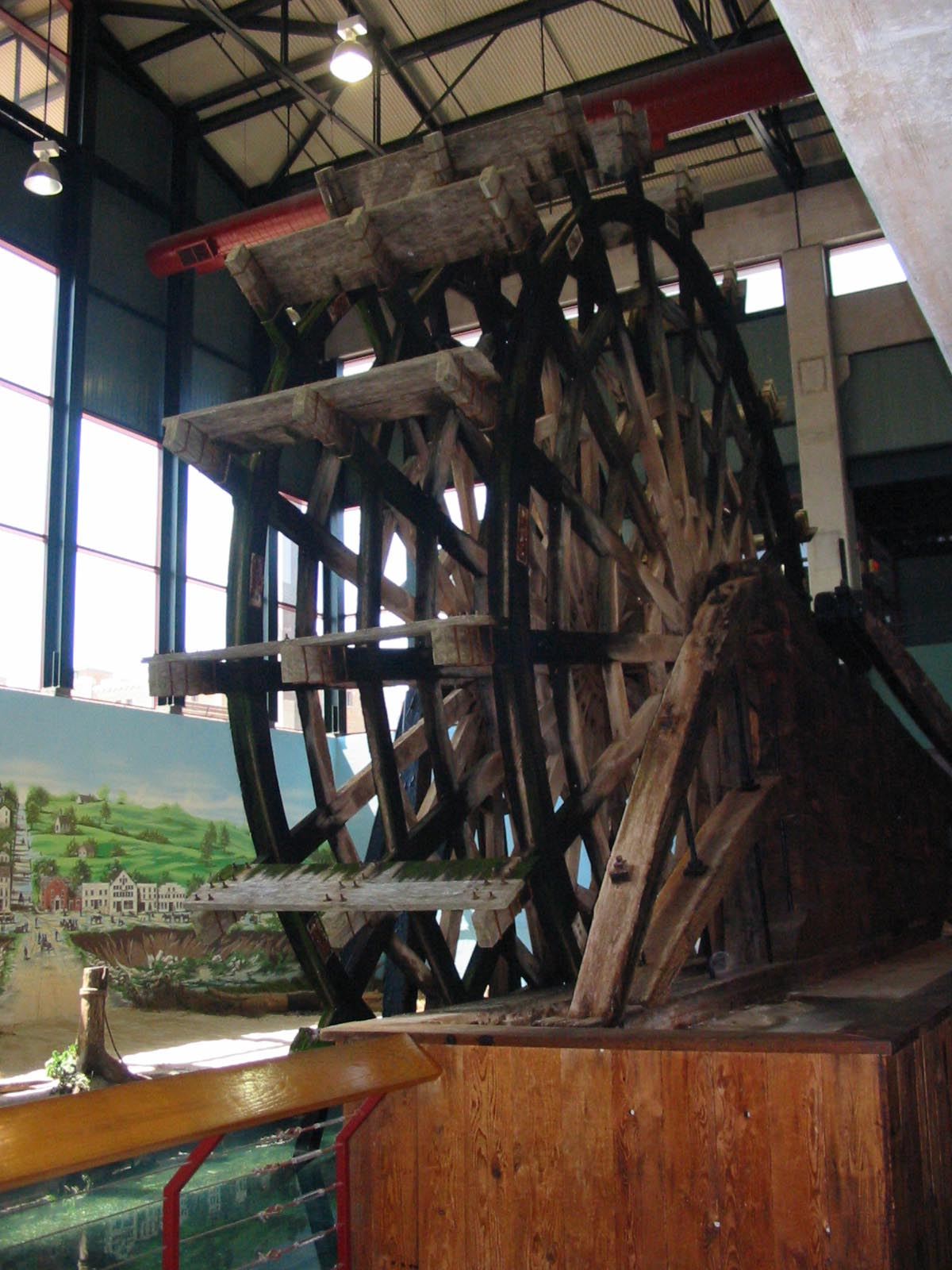
The paddle recovered from the wreck of the Steamboat Arabia, is on display in the Arabia Steamboat Museum, which houses the largest single collection of pre-Civil War artifacts in the world.

- Airline History Museum at Charles B. Wheeler Downtown Airport.
- The Money Museum of the Federal Reserve Bank of Kansas City, with exhibits and tours of the multi-story cash vault.
- Irish Museum and Cultural Center located in Kansas City's Union Station.
- Kansas City Museum at Corinthian Hall, local area history and natural sciences museum in a Beaux-Arts mansion.
- Nelson-Atkins Museum of Art, the region's largest art museum, located near the Country Club Plaza (see below)
- Arabia Steamboat Museum, artifacts and history of a sidewheel steamboat sunk in 1856, recovered in 1987-88, with interactive displays and tour.
- The National Toy and Miniature Museum, formerly the Toy and Miniature Museum of Kansas City, is the largest collection of classic toys and fine-scale miniatures in the Midwest.
- Trailside Center, a tourist center, museum, and community facility. Items on display include exhibits of Civil War items related to the Battle of Westport as well as items related to the Santa Fe, Oregon, and California trails. The center is staffed by volunteers.
- The Rabbit hOle immersive children's book museum in North Kansas City.

== Parks ==
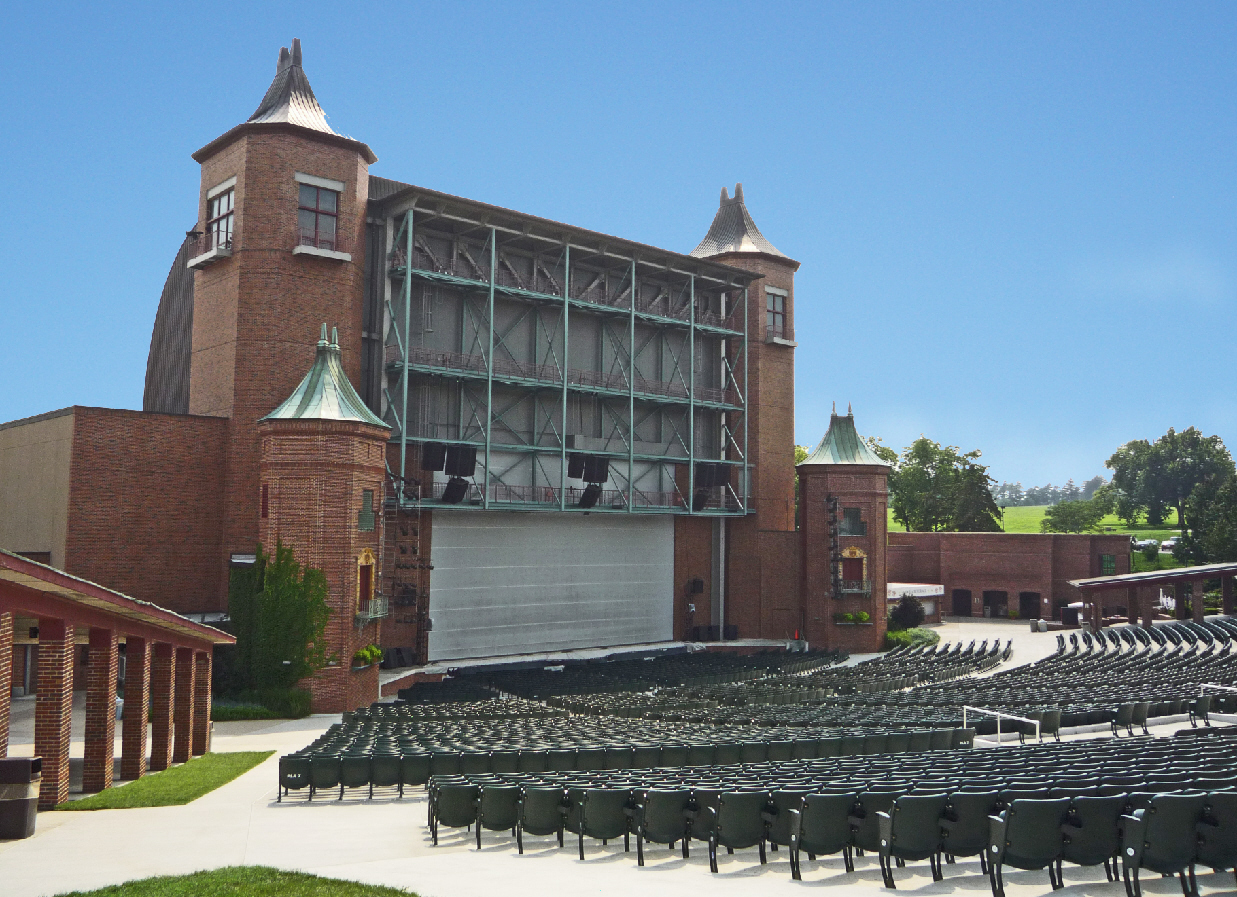
Starlight Theatre is in Swope Park, hosting off-Broadway productions and concert series.

- Battle of Little Blue River site, Big Blue Battlefield Park, 63rd and Manchester Tfwy, American Civil War site.
- Battle of Westport sites, a major battle of the American Civil War.
- Ewing and Muriel Kauffman Memorial Garden, arboretum near Country Club Plaza
- Hodge Park: Shoal Creek Living History Museum, with 20 authentic buildings from the 1800s, events, tours, and historical reenactments
- Loose Park, the third largest park in Kansas City, includes Rose Garden and Civil War markers from the Battle of Westport.
- Swope Park, a 1,805-acre city park containing many other facilities.
  - Kansas City Zoo, 10th largest zoo in the US
  - Lakeside Nature Center, large, city-operated wildlife rescue and nature center with exhibits and woodland trails in Swope Park.
- Worlds of Fun and Oceans of Fun amusement parks.

== Shopping ==
Brush Creek on the Country Club Plaza at night

- Power & Light District, downtown entertainment district
- Country Club Plaza, America's first shopping center designed for the automobile; boutiques, stores, and dining.
- Crown Center shopping, entertainment, restaurant, and hotel complex.
- Westport, historic district; restaurants, entertainment, and nightlife.
- Zona Rosa, retail, office, and residential with shopping, restaurants, and entertainment.
- River Market district, pioneer town of Kansas historical site, City Market, Arabia Steamboat Museum

== Sports ==
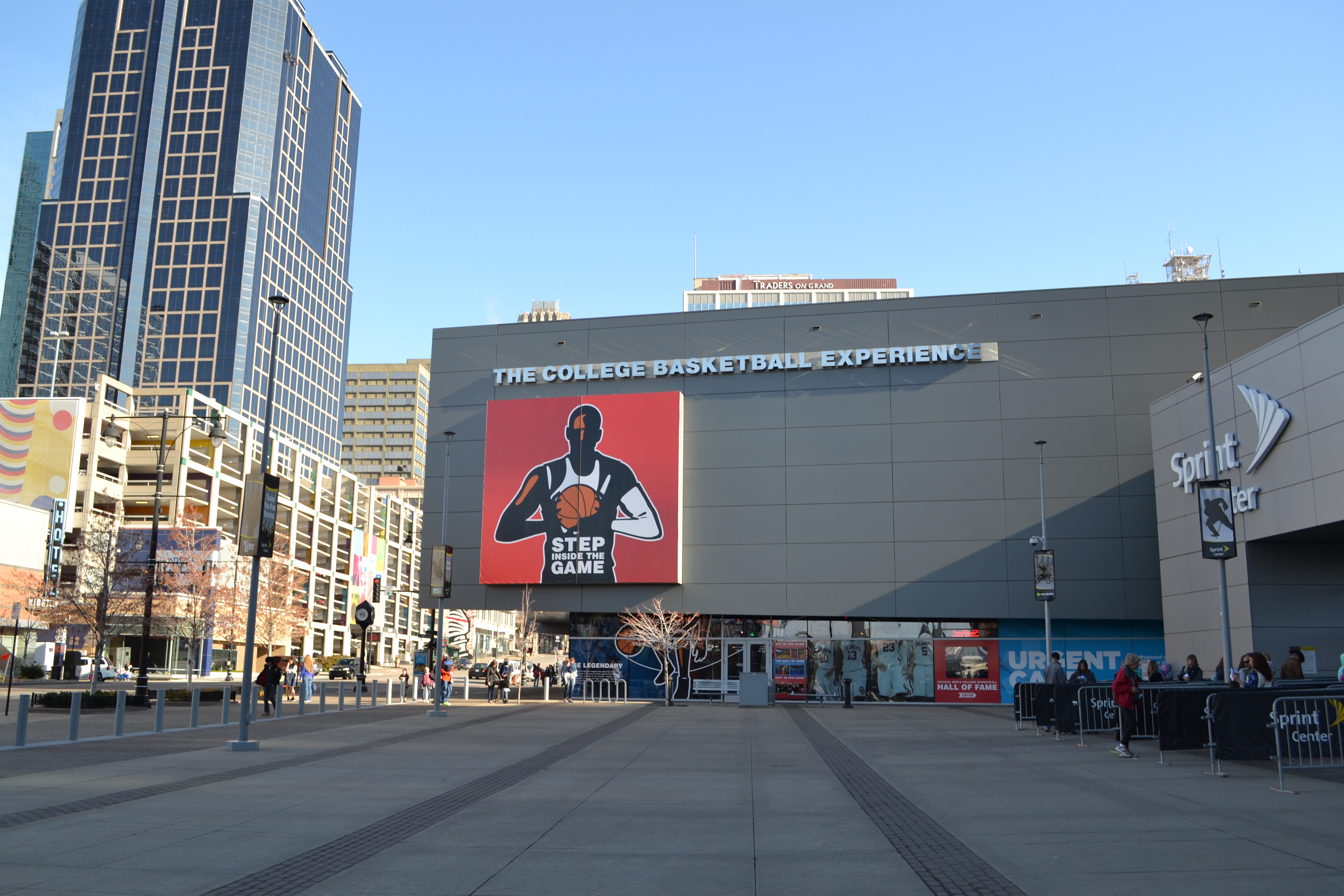
The National Collegiate Basketball Hall of Fame at The College Basketball Experience is in downtown.

- Arrowhead Stadium, home of the Kansas City Chiefs
- College Basketball Experience and National Collegiate Basketball Hall of Fame, next to the Sprint Center
- Kauffman Stadium, home of the Kansas City Royals
- Sporting Park, home of Sporting Kansas City
- CPKC Stadium, home of Kansas City Current
- Kemper Arena (renamed Hy-Vee Arena), former home to the now defunct Kansas City Renegades of the Champions Professional Indoor Football League.
- Negro Leagues Baseball Museum, in the 18th and Vine Historic District

== See also ==
- List of museums in Kansas City, Missouri
- Independence, Missouri, in the KC metro, includes the Truman Library.
- Overland Park, Kansas, in the KC metro, includes the Overland Park Arboretum and Botanical Gardens and Deanna Rose Children's Farmstead.
- Kansas City, Kansas, includes Sporting Park and the Rosedale World War I Memorial Arch.
