= Wheatley-Provident Hospital =

Historic building in Kansas City, Missouri

- St. Joseph's Parochial School; Perry Sanitarium
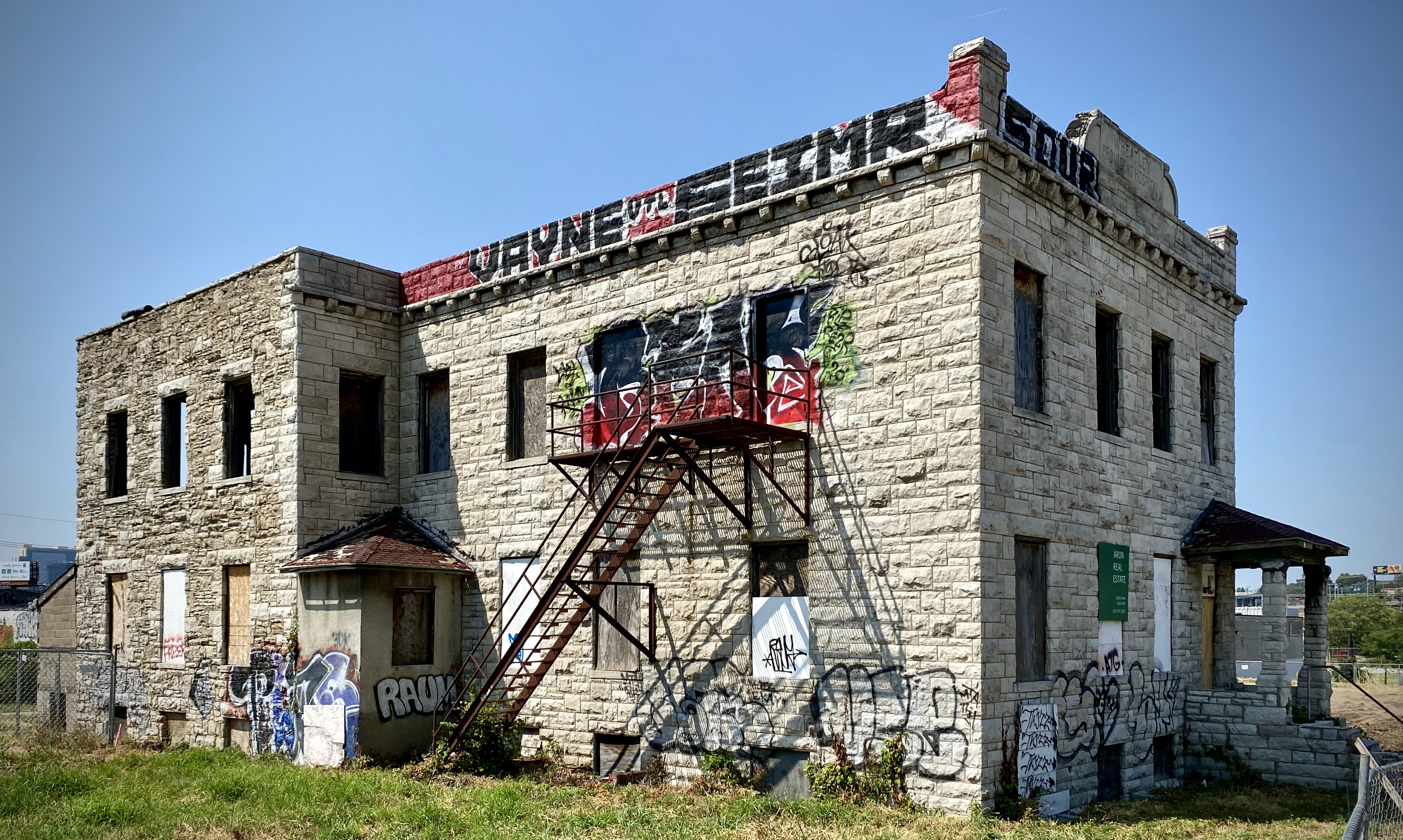
- Southeast side and front door (2020)
- Location in Kansas City
- 39°05′27″N 94°34′10″W
- Location: 1826 Forest Avenue, Kansas City, Missouri

History
- Founded: 1902
- Founder: Dr. John Edward Perry
- Built: 1903; 123 years ago
- Built for: St. Joseph's Parochial School
- Original use: St. Joseph's Parochial School
- Rebuilt: June 1, 1918; 108 years ago

Site notes
- Elevation: 817 feet (249 m)
- Architect: Hoit, Price & Barnes (1925 addition)
- Architectural style: Gothic Revival (elements)
- Restored by: 1826 Forest Re Holdings LLC
- Current use: Historical restoration
- Owner: 1826 Forest Re Holdings LLC
- Website: https://wheatleyprovident.com/ at the Wayback Machine (archived December 4, 2024)

U.S. National Register of Historic Places
- Designated: October 8, 2020
- Reference no.: 100005665

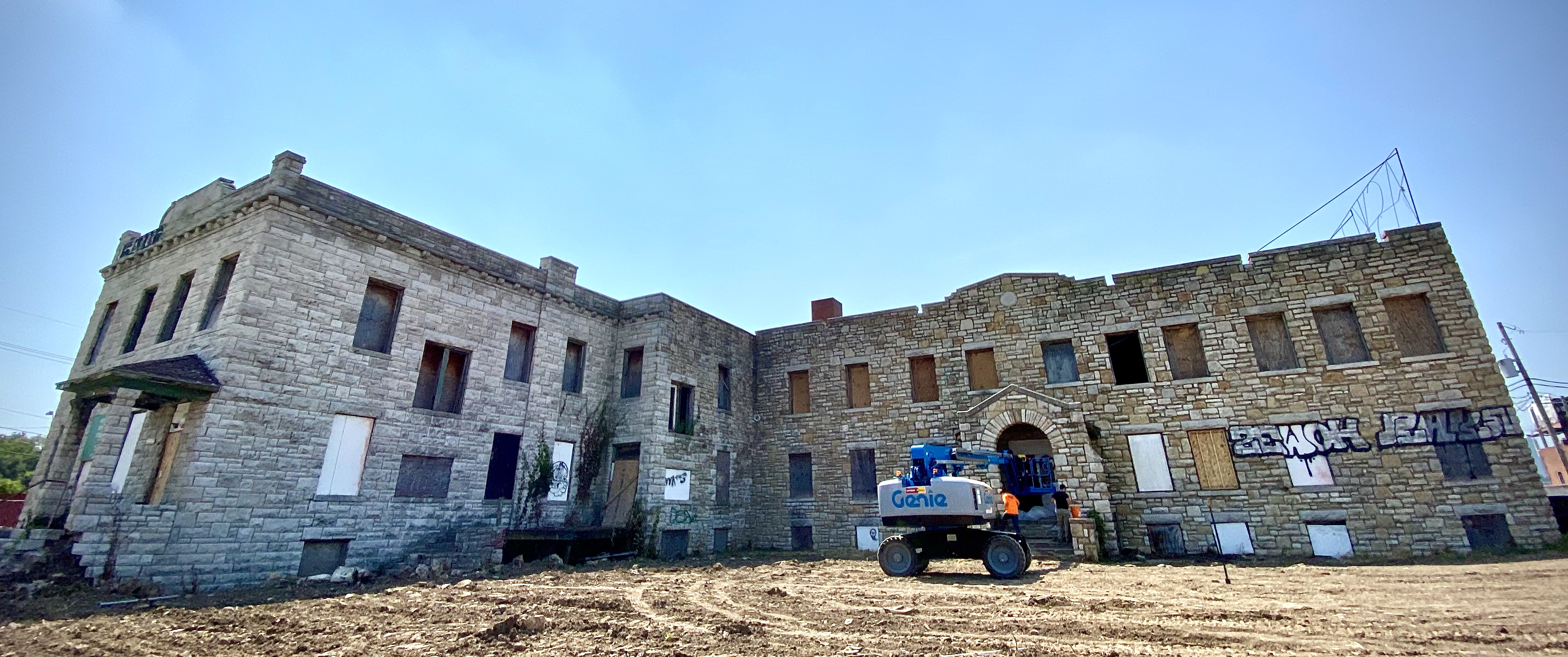
The northeast side had active construction in August 2020.

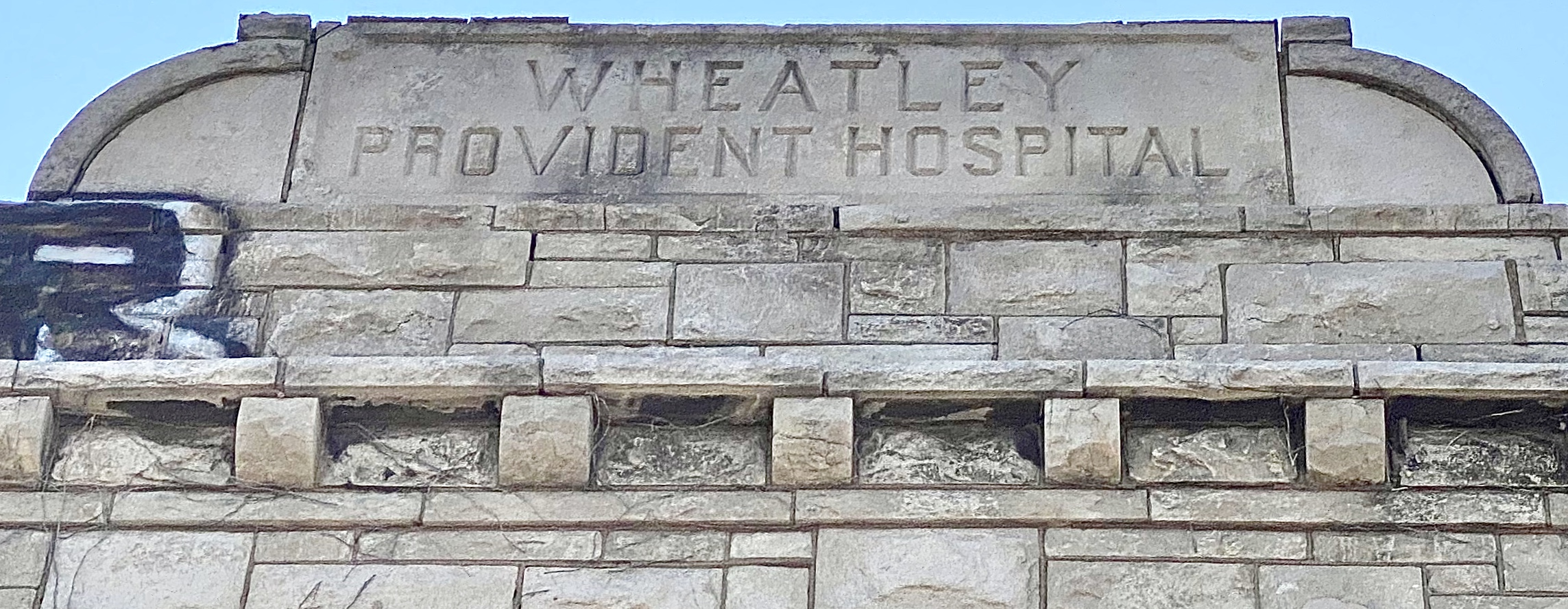
Etching above the east-facing front door (2020)

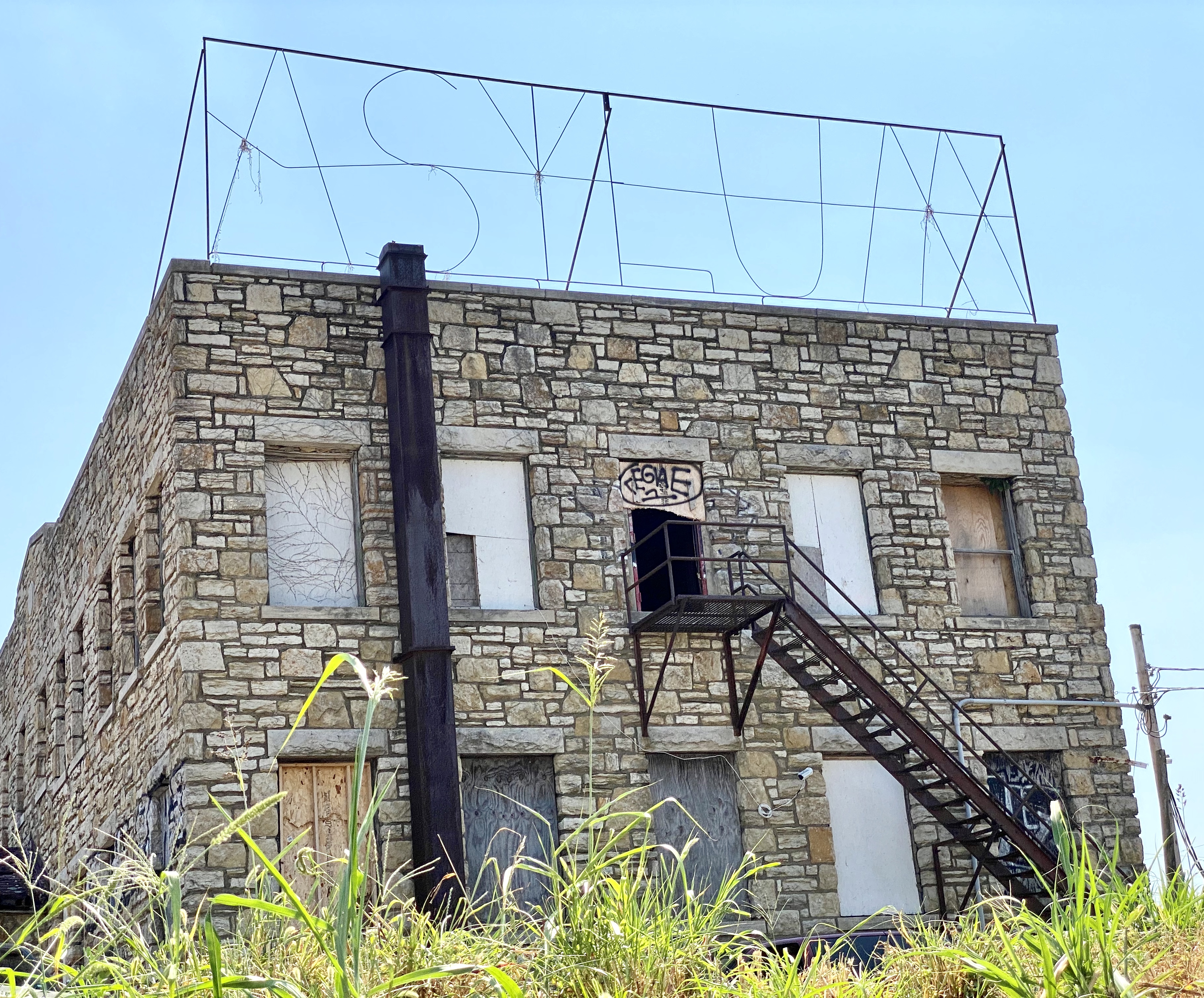
The north face's rooftop "ASYLUM" sign is a remnant (August 2020) from having been a Halloween haunted attraction in the 1980s and 1990s.

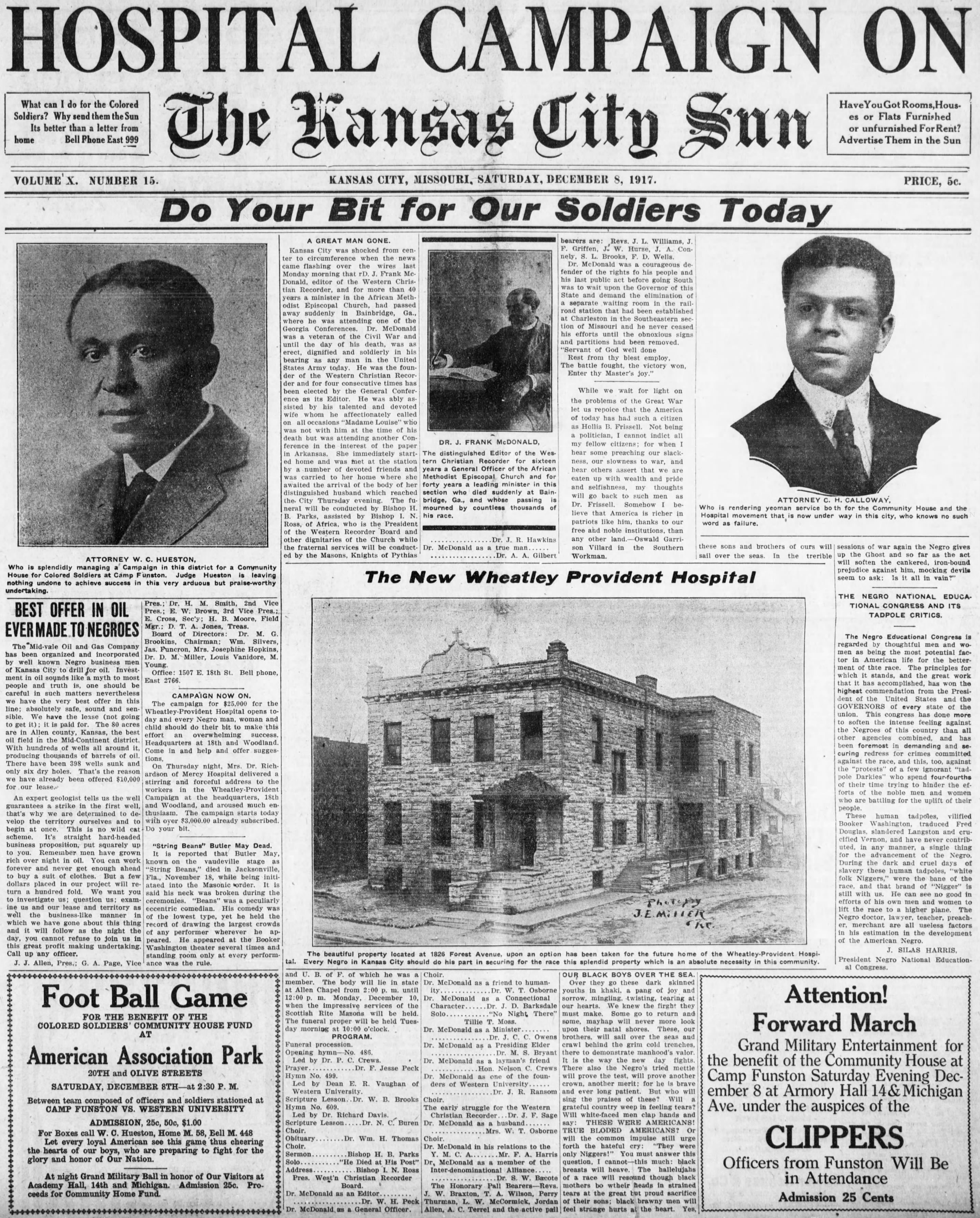
"Hospital Campaign On" is the front page headline of the Kansas City Sun's coverage on December 8, 1917, of the fundraiser for founding Wheatley-Provident Hospital. This page was archived at the Library of Congress for historical significance in the Chronicling America digital collection.

Wheatley-Provident Hospital is a historic former hospital located at 1826 Forest Avenue, three blocks from the 18th and Vine Historic District of Kansas City, Missouri. It is the only surviving hospital building in Kansas City that was owned and operated by the African American community during the era of racial segregation. It was founded by Dr. John Edward Perry, to provide critical medical care and professional training for Black nurses and physicians who the city restrictively segregated in all other institutions.

The facility occupies a two-story limestone structure originally built in 1903 as St. Joseph's Parochial School. The hospital moved into the building in 1918 after outgrowing its previous location. In 1925, a significant pediatric wing was added to the north, designed by the prominent Kansas City architectural firm Hoit, Price & Barnes, known for the Kansas City Power and Light Building.

After over half a century of service, the hospital closed in 1972. The building was listed on the Kansas City Register of Historic Places in 2007 and the National Register of Historic Places on October 8, 2020, and is undergoing historic restoration.

== History ==
The hospital's predecessor was a small hospital and training school for nurses founded in 1902 by Dr. John Edward Perry. In 1910, it was located at 1214 Vine, named Perry Sanitarium and Nurse Training Association.

On June 1, 1918, after an extensive public fundraiser campaign yielding US$25,000 (equivalent to about $535,000 in 2025), the facility was relocated to a pre-existing building at 1826 Forest Avenue. Having been built in 1903 as St. Joseph's Parochial School, that building was renamed Wheatley-Provident Hospital and repurposed as Kansas City's first permanent hospital for Black people. It was led by Dr. Perry and his wife Fredericka Douglass Sprague Perry, who was the daughter of Rosetta Douglass and granddaughter of Frederick Douglass.

A children's wing was added in 1925. By 1971, 50,000 patients had been served, and the hospital was closed 1972. Following its closure, the hospital remained vacant for a period. It was later repurposed temporarily as a haunted attraction, operating under the names The Asylum in the 1980s and Dr. Deadly's Haunted Hospital in the 1990s.

It entered the Kansas City Register of Historic Places in 2007 and the National Register of Historic Places in October 2020. The property became owned by an absentee landlord, and was declared a hazardous building and threatened with demolition by 2017. The historic building was saved from destruction and rehabilitation began in 2021. The owner is 1826 Forest Re Holdings LLC, which is rehabilitating the property into office space, preferably for tenants in the medical field for consistency with its heritage, as "a key to connecting the Crossroads and 18th and Vine".

== See also ==
- City workhouse castle, a historical limestone building near 18th and Vine
- History of the Kansas City metropolitan area
- List of points of interest in Kansas City, Missouri
- Homer G. Phillips Hospital – A major historic African American hospital in nearby St. Louis.
