= Community Christian Church (Kansas City, Missouri) =

Church designed by Frank Lloyd Wright

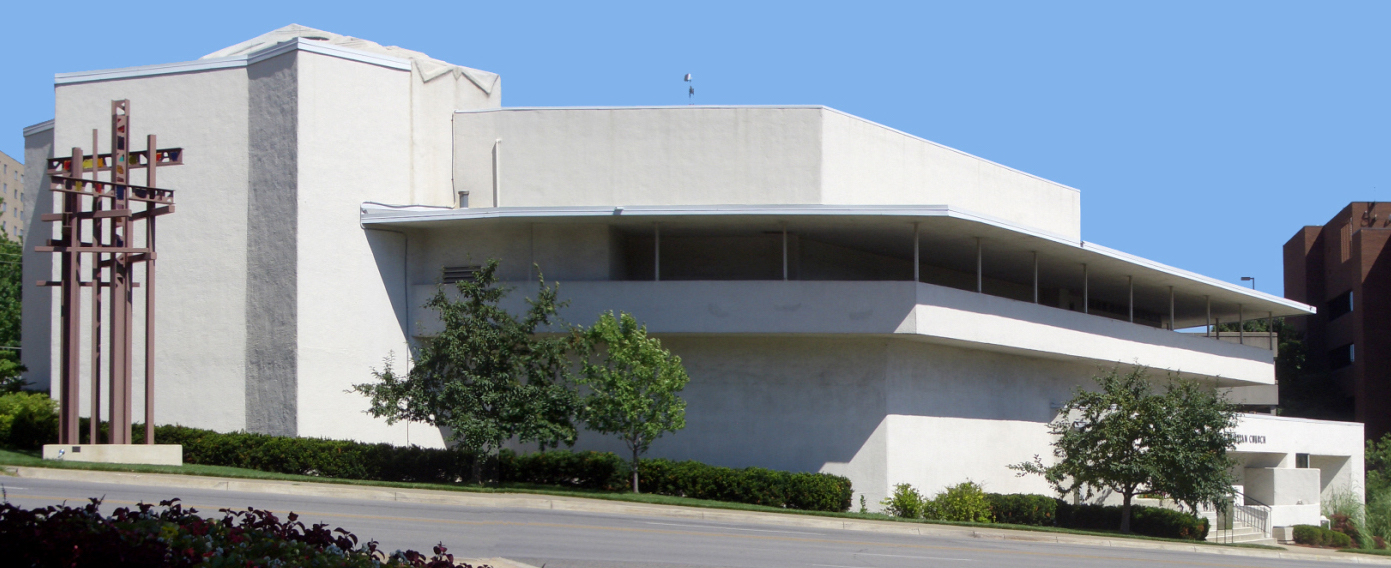
- Community Christian Church (1940–1942), next to the Country Club Plaza

- Location within Missouri Location within the United States

Religion
- Affiliation: Christian Church (Disciples of Christ)
- Year consecrated: 1942
- Status: active

Location
- Location: 4601 Main St., Kansas City, MO 64112
- Coordinates: 39.043161°N 94.586465°W

Architecture
- Architect: Frank Lloyd Wright
- Style: Usonian

Website
- http://www.community-christian.org/

Community Christian Church was designed by Frank Lloyd Wright and sits across from the Country Club Plaza's main shopping district on Main Street at East 46th Street in Kansas City, Missouri. It is affiliated with the Christian Church (Disciples of Christ) denomination, which has a heavy representation in the Kansas City area.

In April 1940, members of the church congregation contracted Wright and asked him to design a new building to replace their previous church which had been destroyed in a fire. Wright based his design on a parallelogram including some features previously conceived for his last building for Johnson Wax Company, along with one additional unique feature: a spire of light. Due to high building costs, the scale of the church was reduced during construction. The auditorium was cut back from a planned 1,200 seats to 900 seats, many details were eliminated, and the building was sheathed in gunite, a form of lightweight concrete, over Wright's objections. The spire of light also could not be built and illuminated due to technical limitations of the times. However, the church was dedicated on January 4, 1942, and served the congregation well.

In 1994, the Steeple of Light was finally completed as planned by Kansas City artist Dale Eldred. Eldred died in 1993 before it was completed, so his partner and collaborator Roberta Lord finished the project. The components are housed on the church roof inside of a perforated dome on the building's northwestern corner. The spire is created by four 16-inch (41 cm) xenon bulbs ignited by 40,000 volts of electricity, that, in combination with a parabolic reflector, produces 300 million candlepower of illumination (per light, 1.2 billion cp total) in a near-perfect column. The spire can be seen for miles around Kansas City, and reportedly can be spotted 10 miles (16 km) north of the Plaza, depending on conditions. It has been calculated to stop at least 3 miles (4.8 km) above the Earth, about half the maximum height at which jet airplanes fly. The Steeple of Light is lit regularly on Fridays, Saturdays, and Sundays; has extended hours on holidays; and remains dark on the two days before Easter. Its lighting is one of the features of the annual Plaza lighting ceremony.

Walk-in tours of Community Christian Church are open to the public and free of charge, and guided tours may be scheduled by calling or emailing the church at least two weeks prior to a visit.

== See also ==
- List of Frank Lloyd Wright works
- List of points of interest in Kansas City, Missouri
