= Hale's Tours of the World =

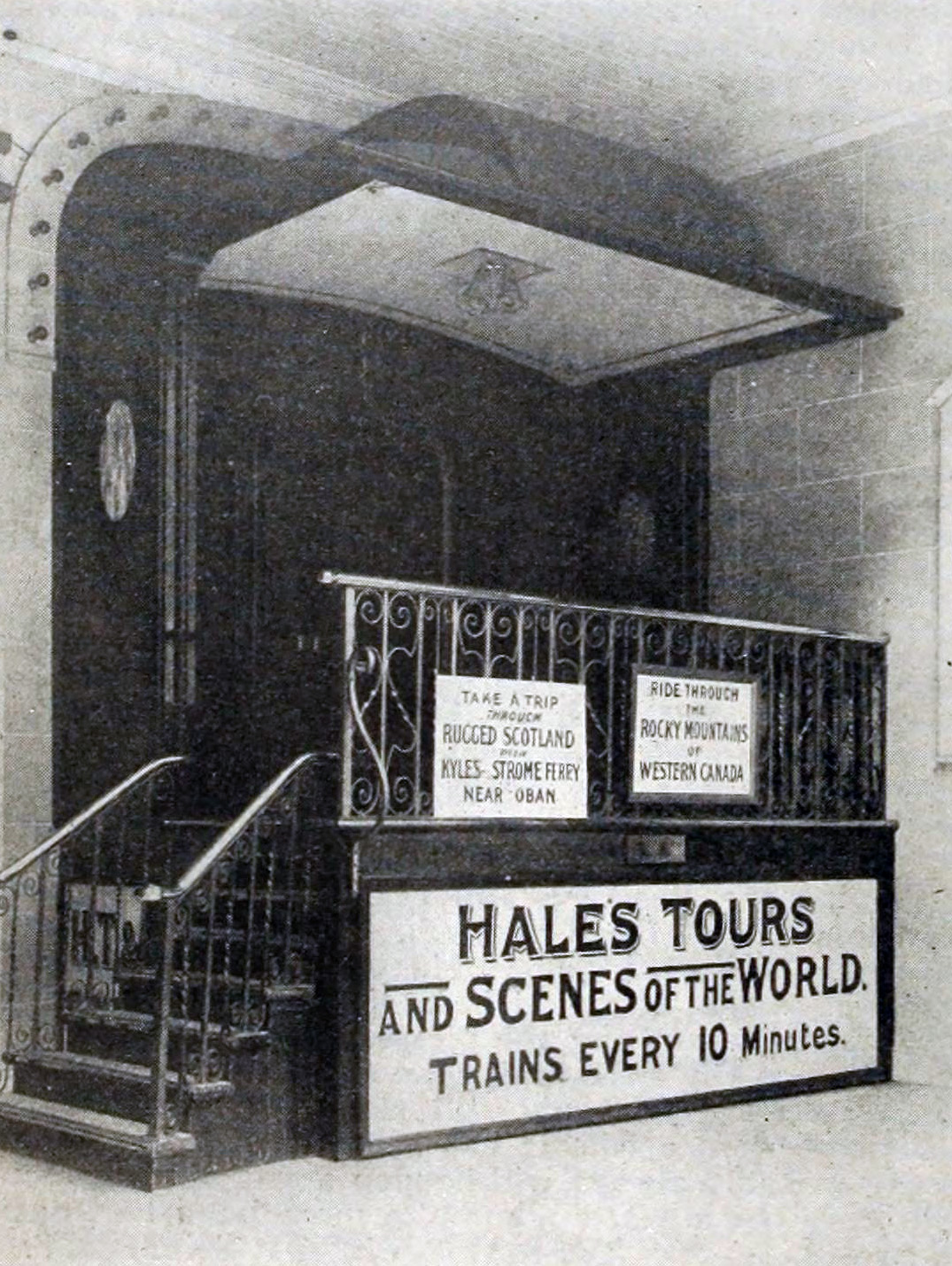
Entrance to Hale's Tours (1916), operated by Adolph Zukor in company with William A. Brady

Hale's Tours of the World were an attraction at amusement parks and similar venues in the early 20th century. They were specially constructed spaces designed to simulate a railway journey.

== Creation ==
George C. Hale was born on October 28, 1849. He was a well-travelled and prolific inventor, engineer and Fire Chief of Kansas City, Missouri from 1882 until retiring in 1902. Interested in the use of film, Hale came across William Keefe who had conceived the idea of an imitation railway passenger car on a circular platform that would remain motionless as a panorama of images would revolve around the "passengers" to simulate the experience of a railway journey. "Realism" would be increased with staff providing a rocking motion, a wind machine and sound effects. Lacking the financial capital, Fell teamed with Judge Fred Gifford who introduced Fell to Hale who had possibly viewed the phantom rides on tours of Great Britain. The idea was patented in 1904; Hale and Gifford soon bought out Keefe's interest in the venture.

== First uses ==
The first appearance of Hale's Tours were at Electric Park, Kansas City in 1905. The frequent claim of appearing at the 1904 St. Louis Exposition is a myth given that there is no contemporary record of such an attraction yet George C. Hale's much less groundbreaking and famous spectacle 'A Midnight Fire in Greater New York' is well attested at the world's fair.

The idea was further refined under the name Pleasure Railway. The idea then appeared in New York and Chicago and spread throughout the United States and Canada with an estimated 500 Hale's Tours appearing between 1906 and 1911. In 1906 Wade C. Gifford took Hale's Tours throughout the world in Mexico, the British Isles, Continental Europe and Hong Kong.

== In Britain ==
The American film producer and director Charles Urban, had an early franchise for Hale's Tours at 165 Oxford Street (later the Academy cinema), with main offices selling films and equipment a few hundred yards away on Wardour Street. The business seems to have been in liquidation by 1906, when the franchise for Hale's Tours was acquired by J. Henry Iles in December 1906, and a company named Hales Tours of the World Ltd. was set up in December of that year to take over the running of 165 Oxford Street. Further venues were opened in Nottingham, Manchester, Brighton, Leeds, Blackpool and Bristol.

== Decline ==
As with most novelties, Hale's Tours gradually came to a decline as audiences tired of the idea. A lack of films lead to infrequent changes in program and some people felt uncomfortable being in a rocking carriage at close quarters with strangers. Hales died on 14 July 1923.

== In popular culture ==
An amusement similar to Hale's Tour appears in the 1948 film Letter from an Unknown Woman.

== Legacy ==
One film, A Trip Down Market Street was added to the National Film Registry in 2010.
