= City workhouse castle =

Historic building in Kansas City, Missouri

- Vine Street workhouse castle, Brant Castle
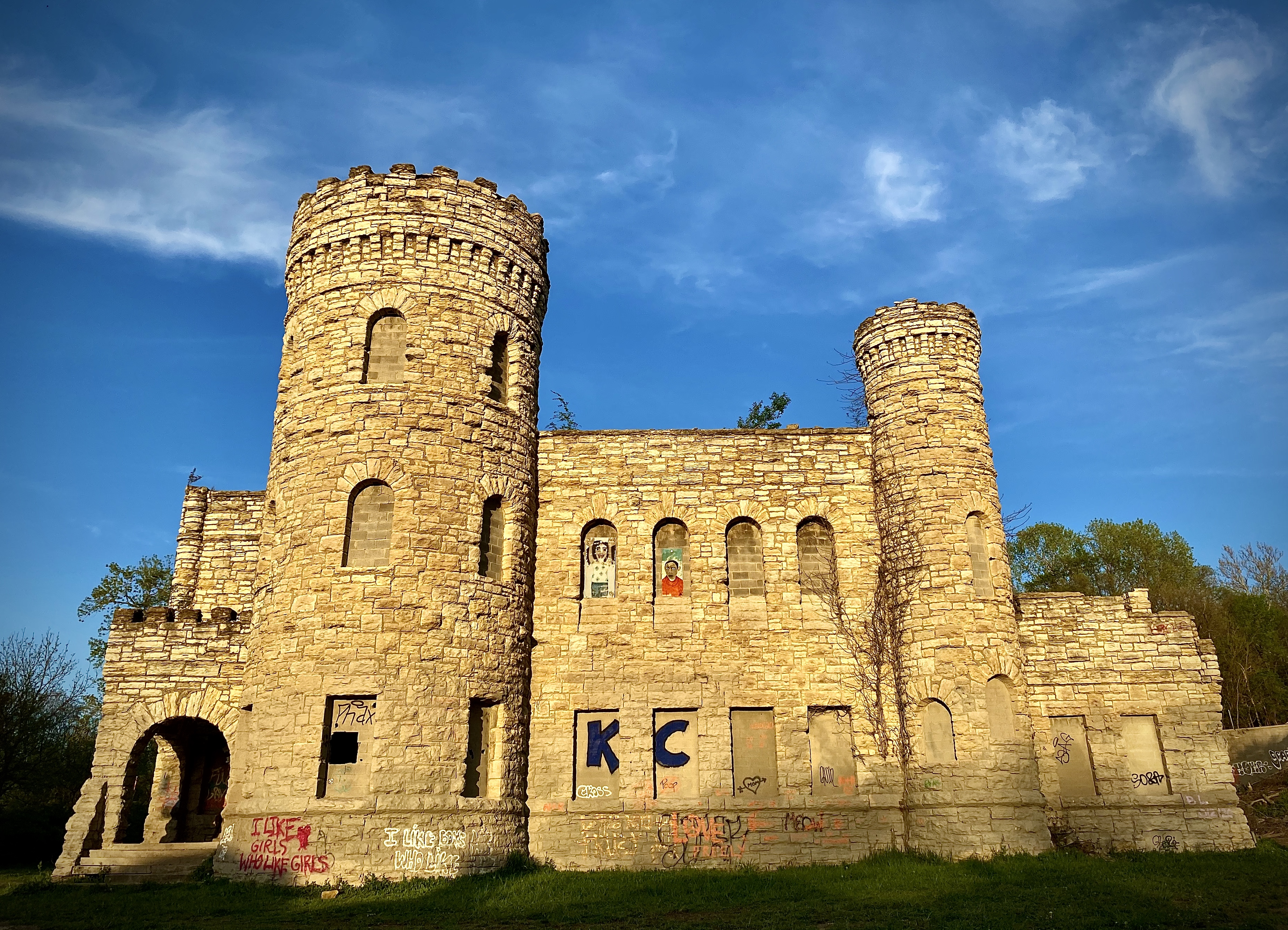
- Castle front in April 2020
- Interactive map of City workhouse castle
- 39°5′16.6776″N 94°33′47.0298″W
- Location: Kansas City, Missouri

History
- Founder: Major Alfred Brant
- Built: December 20, 1897; 128 years ago
- Built for: Workhouse jail
- Original use: City workhouse jail

Site notes
- Elevation: 857 ft
- Architect(s): A. Wallace Love and James Oliver Hogg
- Architectural styles: Romanesque Revival and Scottish baronial
- Current use: Abandoned
- Owner: Kansas City Business Center for Entrepreneurial Development

The City workhouse castle (Vine Street workhouse castle, Brant Castle) is a city historical register site located at 2001 Vine Street in Kansas City, Missouri. The castle was constructed by contractors in 1897 for US$25,700 (equivalent to $995,000 in 2025) next to the natural deposit of yellow limestone which had been quarried by inmates of the preceding city workhouse jail across Vine Street. On December 20, 1897, the castle was inaugurated as the city's new workhouse with dedicated jail. Its Romanesque Revival architecture with castellated towers were in vogue among the Kansas City upper class at the time. Its first Superintendent, Major Alfred Brant, proudly declared it "the best building Kansas City has".

It was conceived as a model of humanitarian housing and rehabilitation. Its function in corrections ended in 1924, succeeded by the Leeds Farm to the remote east of the city where inmates also grew crops. The castle is two blocks south of the historic 18th and Vine, which has been referred to as America's third most recognized street after Broadway and Hollywood Boulevard due to the legacy of Kansas City jazz music. Across the next five decades, the castle and surrounding field were periodically repurposed more than one dozen times including as a city storage facility, a Marine training camp, and a dog euthanasia center—abandoned in 1972. Across the decades of infamous blight of the whole Vine Street District, the dilapidated wood interior collapsed down to only the open limestone walls. The structure steadily accumulated trash, trees, graffiti, and a cascade of unproductive owners and investors including Bank of America and a convicted con artist. The castle has been only a token feature among many broken promises by developers for lucrative areawide rehabilitation, at least one of whom proposed the structure's demolition. In 2014, it was bought conditionally cash-free by its current owner, Vewiser Dixon.

In 2014, Daniel and Ebony Edwards led a huge nonprofit project to successfully remove 62 tons of trash, and then hosted their own wedding and various community events there, with the ultimately unrealized goal of buying and developing it into a permanent community center. The Kansas City Star nicknamed the project "Daniel and Ebony's Modern Fairy Tale", as the castle's first functionality in 42 years. The site has resumed vacancy and attracting graffiti since 2016.

== History ==
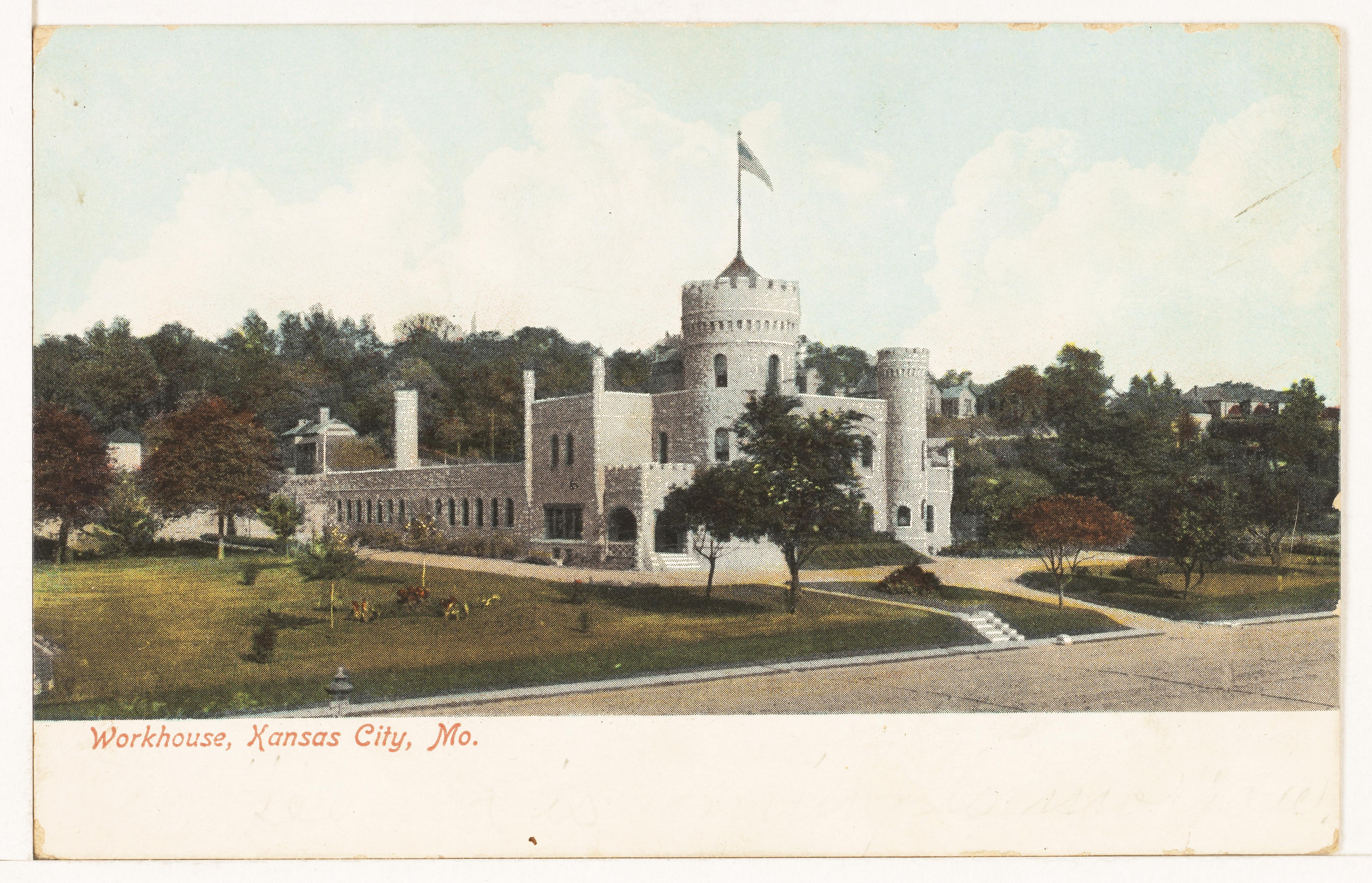
This postcard of the castle is c. 1907.

=== Background ===
By the late 1800s and early 1900s, Kansas City experienced an explosion in population and in petty crime. The population was 700 in 1846, 32,260 in 1870, and 132,716 in 1890. Prohibition of alcohol was enacted in Kansas in 1881 and nationwide in 1919, so drinkers simply went to Kansas City, Missouri's hundreds of saloons and taverns where the Pendergast political machine maintained alcohol supply.

Vagrancy was a class of petty crimes usually arising from a chronically degenerate lifestyle, resistance to employment and existing social programs, or just hard luck. Such crimes included homelessness, unemployment, alcoholism and other drug addiction, gambling addiction, domestic violence, public drunkenness or fighting, petty theft, scams, pimping or "vampires", or unpaid debt. By early 1906, the north side (what now includes River Market) reportedly harbored an epidemic cycle of vagrancy due to "disreputable" saloon owners giving food, clothing, alcohol, and shelter under their porch awnings, knowing that what little money the vagrants would ever earn would soon be spent in the favored saloons. The vagrants were inclined to crime for their sporadic leisure money, and the saloon owners would often snitch on vagrants when questioned by police. Citing a robbery at Edward Abbott's saloon at 117 Holmes St, the Kansas City Star reported, "The North end is recognized by the police to be the home of crooks. There is no other place in the city for them to stay."

Meanwhile, the Kansas City Star reported the city government's open commitment against homelessness and unemployment for citizens deemed "deserving" by their willingness to work, including a homeless shelter and a basic job placement. For offenders who were too problematic for that help and who disobeyed police orders to vacate Kansas City, the legal system's last resorts were its main jail or a special court sentence into its workhouse.

The Superintendent of the old workhouse was Captain Thomas Phelon. In 1885, it had 70 prisoners and city staff reportedly found it to overall be a fire hazard capable of "almost inevitably a shocking loss of life". By 1896, inmates did various works such as breaking rocks, to repay their sentenced fines at a rate of $0.50 per day. In 1897, it had almost 200 inmates, some having lodged there for most of the past ten years, and was "fairly alive with vermin". The Kansas City Star outspokenly deplored the rotten frame shack with heavy boards nailed on the outside "to keep the prisoners from kicking holes through". The cell room—"reeking with a thousand of different odors, with no sort of proper ventilation, and inhabited by millions of vermin of all sorts—was a place to turn the stomach of a sewer rat". The facility was condemned as "a disgrace to any city in a civilized country".

=== Design ===
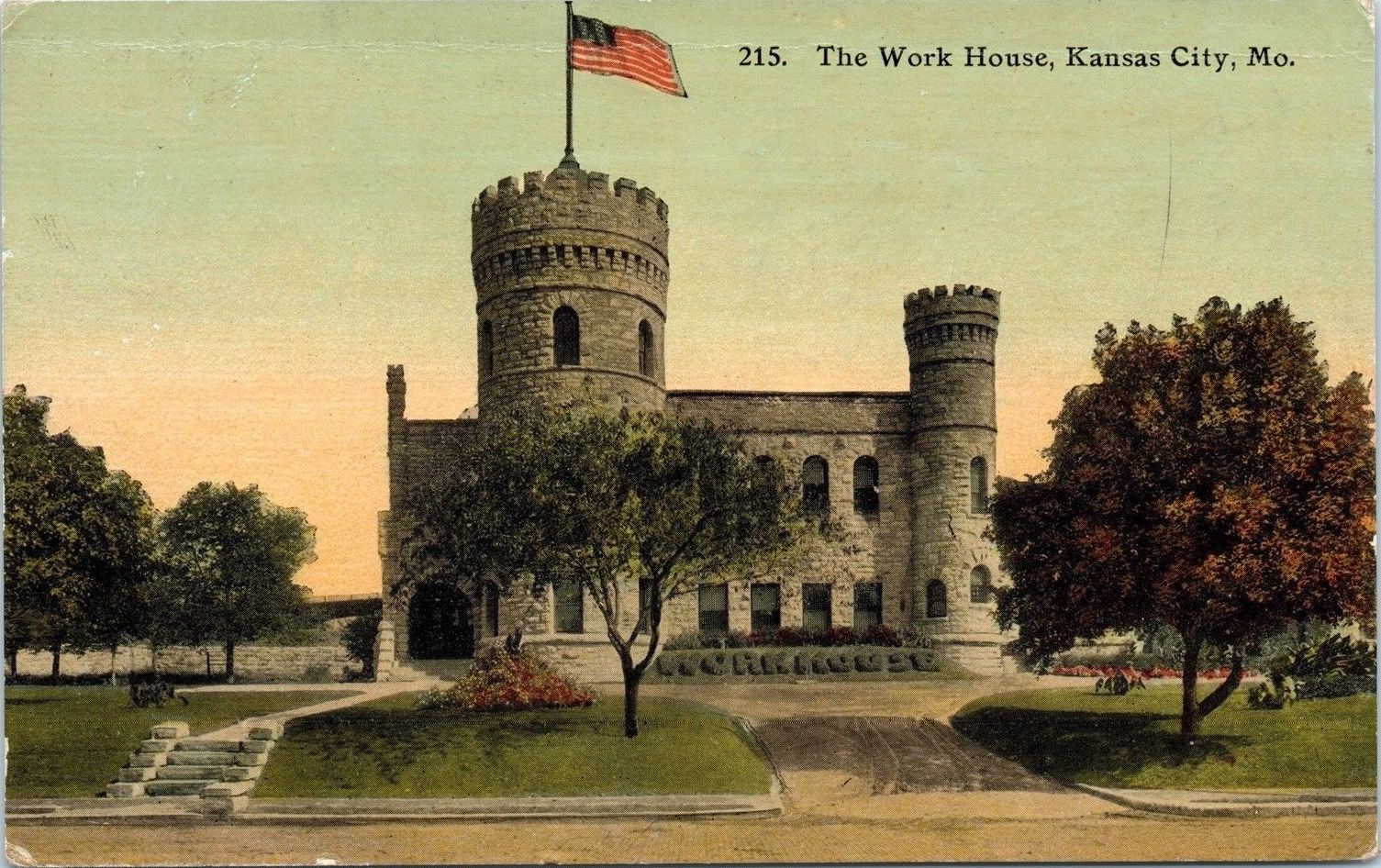
This postcard of the castle, c. 1911, has "workhouse" spelled in landscaping.

A new facility was needed with greater capacity and scope: a high-security combined jail and workhouse, a decent standard of living, and a hard-core productivity program for serious offenders. The Kansas City Star equated the humanitarian need for building a new city workhouse with that of expanding the city hospital: "Humanity demands it, and the exercise of humanity is always good economy." Alderman Morgan was a longstanding champion of this initiative. In a January 14, 1895, meeting, the Lower Council required the Superintendent of Buildings to plan a new workhouse with a US$15,000 budget. The facility was designed by two prominent Kansas City architects—James Oliver Hogg and A. Wallace Love, who was also Kansas City's Superintendent of Buildings—with suggestions from Major Brant.

The base building cost proposal was $15,000 for the building and $7,000 for steel cells, totaling $22,000. The location is in questionable proximity to the city's population center, though it was coincidentally chosen for its generous natural deposit of yellow limestone. It would be quarried by inmates, and constructed by contract labor. Building design and land use plans were complete by March 1895, anticipating funding at the beginning of the city's fiscal year on April 15. The design was presented as "a commodious and imposing structure" for "a model prison of the kind", emphasizing ventilation and sanitation. Its unusual style is inspired by 16th century Europe's Romanesque Revival architecture with "the impression of an ancient baronial castle". Its solid limestone walls are two feet thick and mortared with concrete. Its towers extend 20 feet above the two story roof, castellated with regularly spaced battlements on top. The building has parapet walls, Scotch coping, and windows narrow and barred. Its appearance was considered "pleasing" and the castle style was in vogue among the Kansas City upper class at the time. The actual final construction cost was reportedly $25,700 (equivalent to $995,000 in 2025).

The main building has two stories, with a front 39.10×42.9 feet and a wing 54.4×24.3 feet. The first floor has many rooms: the superintendent's office; the bookkeeper's office; a big guard room in view of the whole cell room; a large dining room for inmates and doubling as a chapel; an employee dining room with an open fireplace, tile mantle, and "comforts of home"; a kitchen suitable for "a most aesthetic chef" with a new 9-foot stove range, a large icebox built into the wall, and several hot and cold water faucets; and boys' cells. The Musicians' Union held concerts in the dining hall. The dining hall and kitchen where the women work, had a spiral staircase. The second floor held eight women's cells with mattresses, plus a bathroom with a porcelain bathtub and "all the modern conveniences". Brant's "especial pride" was the boys' reformatory school room, with blackboards, where he said he was willing to teach if necessary. The rear part has one story, 122.8×35 feet with 30 steel cells for up to 120 adult male prisoners "so as to separate the young prisoners from those old and hardened in crime" because "mixed up with the men, they can learn nothing but wickedness". The outer walls are very thick, potentially expandable upward to add a second story of men's cells and a permanent chapel, though that never materialized. The castle was heated with steam, expected to eventually have its own electricity plant. The basement is called a "dungeon" for punishment, completely darkened by solid steel sheets, and completed after the facility. The laundry building was behind the castle.

The inmate room has 28 cells "of the most modern construction", each with a bench and a cot that must be hooked up against the wall at night, except for one empty cell with "a shower bath of the most business-like sort" especially for new arrivals. The cell floors deter any tunneling escape, adding three layers above the ground: a layer of concrete, a layer of 1/8" steel, and an interior floor of concrete. Cells originally had a spittoon until plumbing was laboriously retrofit in 1909.

The Kansas City Star reported that the castle facility was expected to be less of a "terror" to inmates and more "thoroughly appreciated by the average hobo and that Major Alf Brant's boarders will at once begin to increase rapidly in numbers". Superintendent Brant envisioned the castle's future beyond a workhouse jail, possibly eventually converted into "a reformatory of some kind" or a hospital by replacing the upstairs cells with rooms. He proudly declared it "the best building Kansas City has".

=== Operation ===
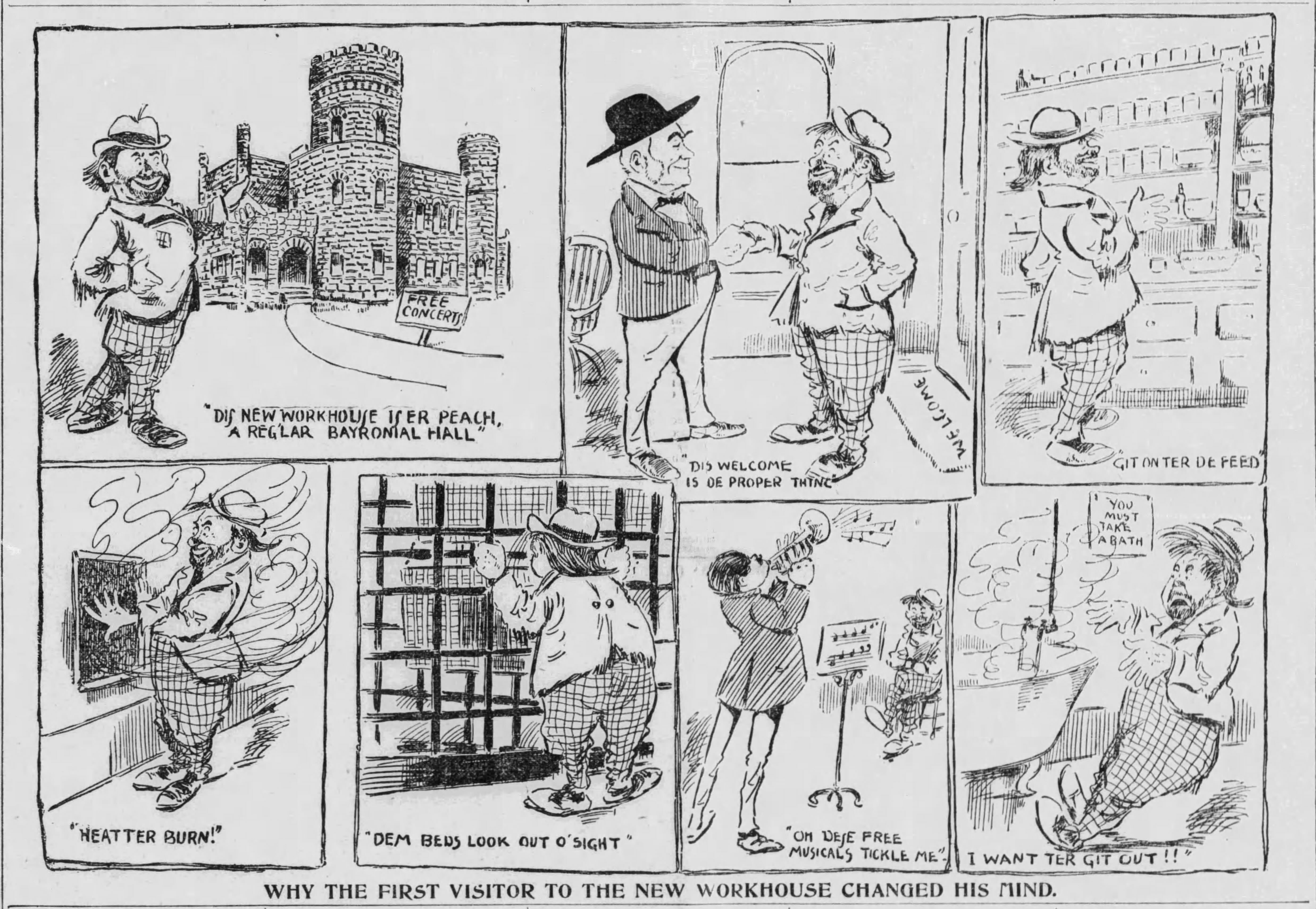
The Kansas City Times put a huge inaugural cartoon in the December 20, 1897 article "Ready for Its Hobo Guests".

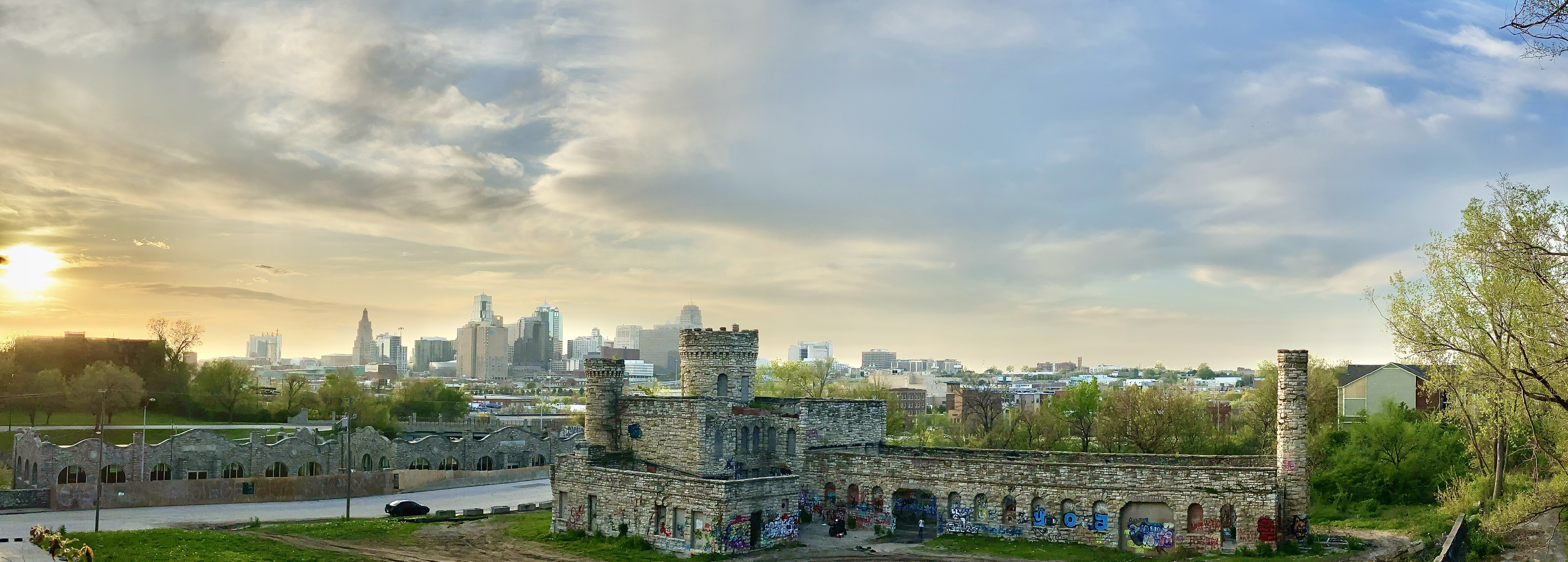
The castle in April 2020, with abandoned city offices across Vine St, overlooks downtown.

On December 20, 1897, The Kansas City Times published an uncommonly huge cartoon and article declaring the new castle "Ready for Its Hobo Guests". All 100-150 men and 20-30 women abandoned the squalor of the old empty workhouse in "a grand cleaning up of hoboes and hoboesses, the like of which was never known in Kansas City before". Upon arrival, Superintendent Alfred Brant admonished the filthy residents to a rigorous hygiene regimen, immediately giving them new clean clothes, thorough baths, and a new outlook. He expected them to maintain dignity as if it was "a new brown stone house to live in".

Judges would attach a fine to a workhouse sentence, intending for the prisoner to work it off at a daily rate. As a part of their sentences, the women sewed prison uniforms and the men labored for the city's public works department. After a few years, life was uniformly hard in the workhouse, reportedly including an "overcrowded, vermin-ridden dungeon". Some prisoners had social connections to drugs, women, and the jail keys. Reportedly, anyone stealing bread in the dining hall would get chained, standing, to a dungeon wall. One prisoner called breakfast "bad, very bad": a rusty pan of gravy, a rusty cup of coffee, half a brick of moldy bread, and a small piece of meat.

In April 1901, infamous temperance movement crusader Carrie A. Nation invaded M. A. Flynn's saloon at 117 East 12th Street, chopping liquor bottles with her hatchet and standing tabletop to lecture patrons on their moral depravity. She was arrested, given a suspended fine of $500 (equivalent to $19,400 in 2025), and ordered out of the city within the hour or else suffer the workhouse castle.

On November 21, 1903, the Kansas City Star openly implored the city leaders to quit ignoring repeated reports of rampant corruption at the city workhouse castle. This reportedly included the confessed torture of prisoners to unconsciousness, and a governmental peanut graft system of recruiting inmate con artists and gamblers who were suitable to a political crony's business needs and granting them parole either by the superintendent's lawless fiat or by "jackleg" lawyers working the system. This produced individually unnoticed small jobs or "peanuts", but on a mass scale.

In early 1906, at the city's historical peak of crime to date, when most of the solved robberies and thefts anywhere in Kansas City were attributed to "North end crooks", the exasperated Police Chief Hayes conducted three campaigns to clear the North end of Kansas City of vagrants, sometimes catching dozens per week. Chief Hayes and Judge Brady had a deal that vagrants who defied police orders to leave town would spend one year at the workhouse. Many were juggled by police holding cells or the courts due to serious overcrowding at the castle.

In 1909, Mayor Thomas T. Crittenden, Jr. responded to the state of workhouse corruption by assigning the newly formed Board of Pardons and Paroles a broad authority of investigation and of conducting individualized paroles. A report was compiled on the workhouse's terrible living conditions and criminal corruption, so most of the staff resigned or were fired. On August 23, 1909, Superintendent Patrick O'Hearn was put on trial and fired for corruption and for having flogged a Black girl who'd insulted his wife. Kansas City park planner George Kessler consulted the warden of the Leavenworth federal prison, who recommended the $39,000 (equivalent to $1,397,000 in 2025) purchase of a 115-acre tract southeast of Leeds with running water, two gas wells, and four oil wells. Kessler helped design a workhouse and farm for vocational rehabilitation in horticulture, vegetable gardening, quarrying, and stonecutting.

The next Superintendent installed electricity, refrigerated water, fresh straw mattresses, showers, and toilet plumbing.

On July 25, 1910, the Kansas City Star reported that the "recalcitrant" Superintendent Herman E Weisflog stubbornly refused to vacate his office even after having been displaced from the city payroll in favor of a duly elected and hired successor, I. L. Dayhoff. The new man had reportedly been "peering in with a yearning and pie-eating appeal" after having quit his two jobs at a book publisher and at a maintainer of Yellowstone Park pleasure camps. Weisflog responded to a visitor who supposed him already gone, "Foolish question 6,713. Sure I'm here, and still—and yet. Your supposer played you bad. [Dayhoff] was here Saturday. Comes often but doesn't stay long. Rather warm out here." Weisflog's tenure had been reportedly "excellent" and he admitted that Dayhoff had legitimately won the job by virtue of the civil service competitive examination, but he slammed the table and said "Here I am and here I stay until my year is up or the court comes out with Battery B and tells me to vacate. I'm a stayer—not a quitter until the last ditch. Is that plain?" Dayhoff said the two had no quarrel, had toured the facility as colleagues, and that he was content to wait. Two days later on July 27, the two friends happily resolved at the mayor's office to a handoff on September 1, because time was needed for Weisflog to find a new house and for Dayhoff to make a business trip to Cuba. Weisflog mused that life is too short and the weather too hot "to distress one's self about such a little thing as a job ... I bow to the insurgents."

On June 23, 1911, the male inmates moved permanently to the new workhouse farm at Leeds, leaving only the women in the castle. Nicknamed "Farm of Hope", the workhouse farm was led by Superintendent Jacob Billikopf, who would soon become an internationally respected authority in social services, and who busted loan sharks by starting the Municipal Loan Bureau of Kansas City. He held the theory that "the best way to reform a man is to do it in the open, at some useful and healthful work, instead of cooping him up in a close prison, where he is forced to idleness".

In 1924, the site's original function as workhouse jail was vacated. Across the following five decades, the castle and surrounding field would be periodically repurposed more than one dozen times, including as a city storage facility, a Marine training camp, and a dog euthanasia center. In 1969, the remodeled castle served as sewer department offices, with the basement dungeon becoming a neatly painted supply storage area. The site was abandoned in 1972.

=== Rehabilitation ===
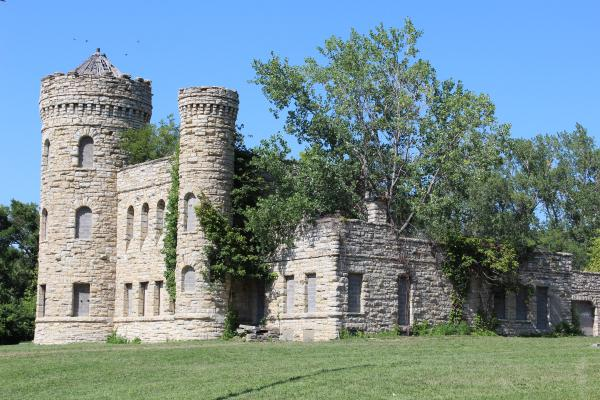
In 2014, the castle was filled with weeds and trees.

The castle became ruinous, suffering a succession of lackadaisical or corrupt owners. Vacant for another five decades of widespread Vine Street District blight, its roof collapsed and the interior floors followed. This let it fill with weeds, trees, and garbage, while vandals covered it in spraypainted graffiti. This millennium made the castle a small token among colossal visions and broken promises of erasing Kansas City's epidemic blight. In 2001, Bank of America pre-announced $46 million to redevelop 96 acres of blight across the Vine Street District but canceled in 2005 ahead of the global crash of 2008, selling much of it to KC native millionaire Ephren W. Taylor II who likened his invisible investments to the comic book antihero The Phantom. Actually a con artist, Taylor promised in 2006 to develop his large Jazz District property into 42 homes plus a community center of museum in the castle, but was instead convicted of a Ponzi scheme defrauding Black churchgoers of millions of dollars and federally imprisoned. The castle entered the Kansas City Register of Historic Places on November 29, 2007. This prevented its demolishment by its owner, an estimated $300,000 project.

In 2011, the Black Economic Union (BEU) sued to force a sale and rescue areawide abandoned land. In early 2014, BEU's advisor, Vewiser Dixon, bought 165 parcels cash-free on contract to pay $5 million when the land is developed in either 15 or 30 years. He bought it via his Kansas City Business Center for Entrepreneurial Development, a one-man 501(c)(3) non-profit which he calls a business incubator for minorities.

In 2014, community developers Daniel and Ebony Edwards chose the ruinously abandoned castle as the beneficiary target of their mission to host their own wedding while simultaneously rehabilitating a lost cause property into a modern community center. Dixon enthusiastically allowed the intensive cleanup project, which was powered by the Edwards's nonprofit organization 2orMore plus hundreds of volunteer laborers and funded by $12,500 from a Community Capital Fund grant and crowdfunding. The Kansas City Star nicknamed the optimistic crowdsourced effort "Daniel and Ebony's Modern Fairy Tale", which across the months successfully removed all 62 total tons of trees and trash, hosted concerts with food trucks, and hosted their wedding on June 8, 2014. After 2orMore had rehabilitated the property for free, Dixon offered a $1.5 million sale price to Edwards, who had been expecting one tenth of that price. Edwards then lost his potential investors and abandoned the property entirely in favor of developing other nearby land in the neighborhood. This had been the castle's first functionality in 42 years.

In 2016, the city debated many plans which would affect the castle, all focused on areawide rehabilitation of historic blight of the 18th and Vine neighborhood, which U.S. Representative Emanuel Cleaver claimed is America's third most recognized street after Broadway and Hollywood Boulevard due to the legacy of Kansas City jazz music. As of January 2020, the city has conditionally approved $1.2 million in tax money toward Dixon's proposal for the castle's restoration as an event space, and the land's repurposing into a $150 million housing development called Enterprise Village Ecosystem (EVE). This is presumptively backed by UrbanAmerica, a company which in turn qualifies for up to 25 years worth of tax breaks by association with Eighteenth and Vine Redevelopment Corp., of which Dixon is the President. The city then discovered that Dixon had already been simultaneously under FBI investigation 2019 for allegedly committing financial fraud and death threats while spending at least $20,000 of the Black Economic Union's money to pre-launch EVE. This controversy also prompted the proposal of an upgrade to the city's Ethics Code to introduce background checks of applicants, and the resignation of a tax board member under concern of potential future conflict of interest due to his employment by UrbanAmerica.

== See also ==
- Wheatley-Provident Hospital, fellow historical limestone building in 1903 in 18th and Vine
- Tiffany Castle, Kansas City's other castle, built 1908
- History of the Kansas City metropolitan area
- List of points of interest in Kansas City, Missouri
- English Poor Laws and workhouse
