= George C. Hale =

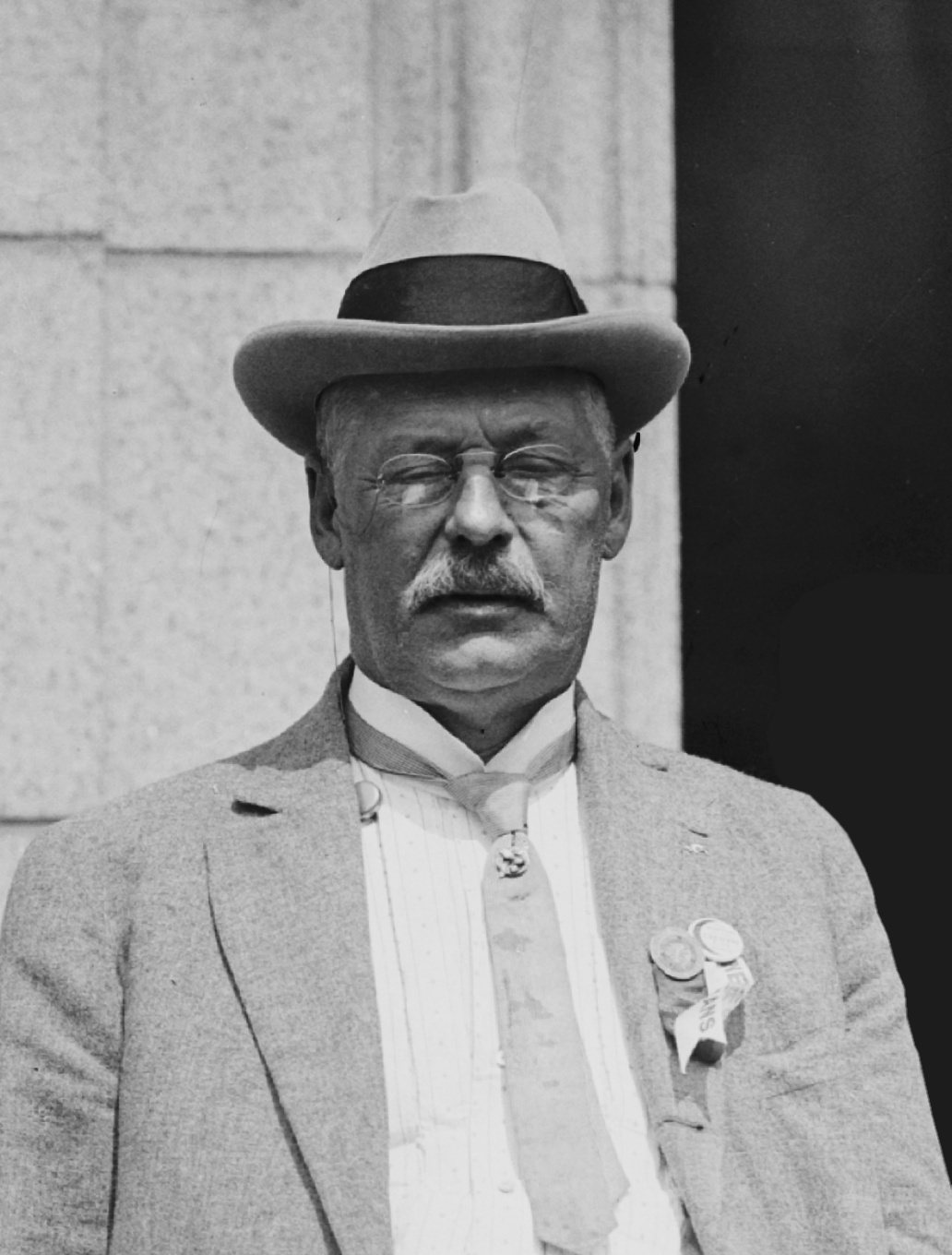
George Consider Hale in 1913

George Consider Hale (1849-1923) was fire chief in Kansas City, Missouri from 1882 to 1902. During this time he competed in the international firemen competition in Paris, and another in London in 1893. He was also the holder of more than 60 patents for fire fighting equipment. He is an honoree of Kansas City Fire Brigade's Hall of Fame.

== Biography ==
He was born in 1849. He was fire chief in Kansas City, Missouri from 1882 to 1902. He was president of the International Association of Fire Chiefs in 1889. In the 1900s, he competed in the Paris Olympic Games in the firefighting discipline.

In 1904, Hale started the Hale's Tours of the World.

He died in 1923.

== Writings ==
- History of the world's greatest fires (1905)
- Compound rotary engine] (1911)
