= American Jazz Museum =

Museum in Kansas City, Missouri, U.S.

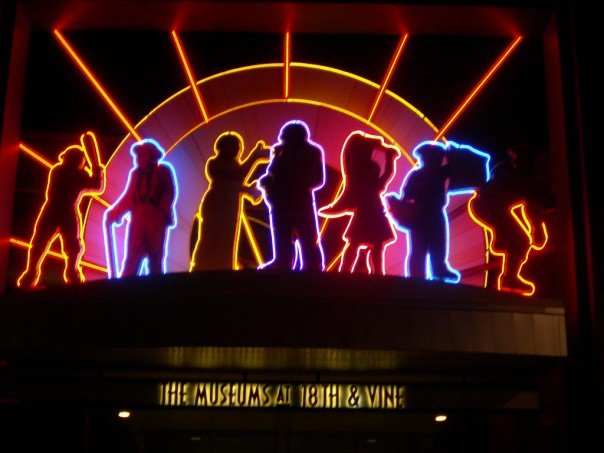
- Established: September 5, 1997
- Location: 18th and Vine, Kansas City, Missouri
- Coordinates: 39.0912832°N 94.5619851°W
- Website: americanjazzmuseum.org

The American Jazz Museum is located in the 18th and Vine historic district of Kansas City, Missouri. The museum preserves the history of American jazz music, especially Kansas City jazz music, with exhibits including Charlie Parker, Duke Ellington, Louis Armstrong, Ella Fitzgerald, Big Joe Turner, Thelonious Monk, and Etta James. The Blue Room is a jazz club which holds live performances multiple nights each week. The museum also runs youth cultural programs, including youth jazz ensembles, lessons, camps, and visual storytelling sessions.

== History ==
The museum opened on September 5, 1997 and shares the building with the Negro Leagues Baseball Museum. In March 2024, music historian and ethnomusicologist Dr. Dina Bennett became the executive director of the museum, returning after beginning her professional career there as in intern in 1999.

== Collections ==
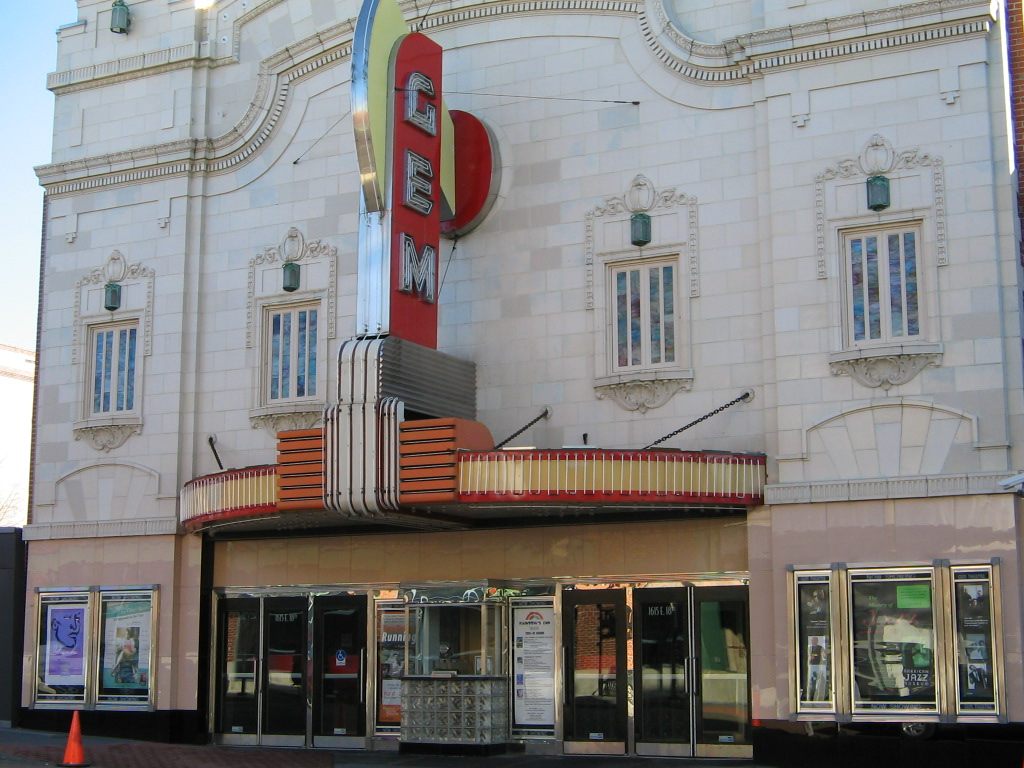
The adjacent Gem Theatre

The museum is a Smithsonian Affiliate. It displays the Graphon alto saxophone played by Charlie Parker at the famous January 1953 Massey Hall concert in Toronto with Max Roach, Dizzy Gillespie, Charles Mingus, and Bud Powell. Other exhibits include Benny Goodman's shoes, Harold Ashby's saxophone, and Myra Taylor's dress. Visitors can learn about different styles and rhythms of jazz at multiple listening station exhibits. The 1912 Gem Theatre is part of the museum, located directly across 18th Street.

== The Blue Room ==
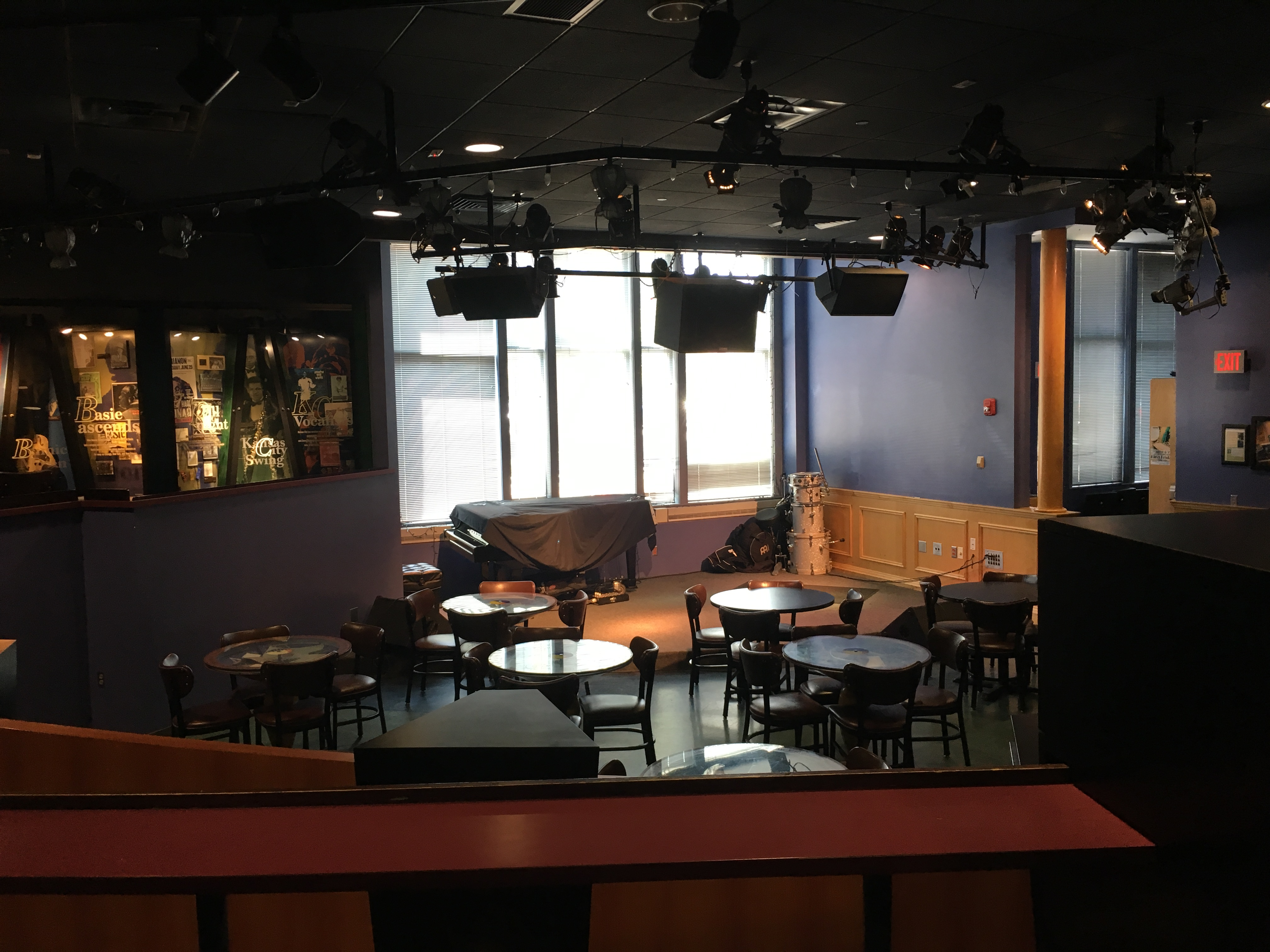
The Blue Room

The Blue Room is a jazz club based on the design of the Street Hotel's Blue Room that hosted players like Charlie Parker and Bennie Moten during the 1930s. The Blue Room has interactive exhibits, a bar, and hosts live performances multiple evenings every week. Its entrance is directly at the corner of 18th and Vine streets.

== See also ==
- List of points of interest in Kansas City, Missouri
- List of music museums
