= Trailside Center =

Facility in Kansas City, Missouri, US

Coordinates: 38°56′53″N 94°34′55″W

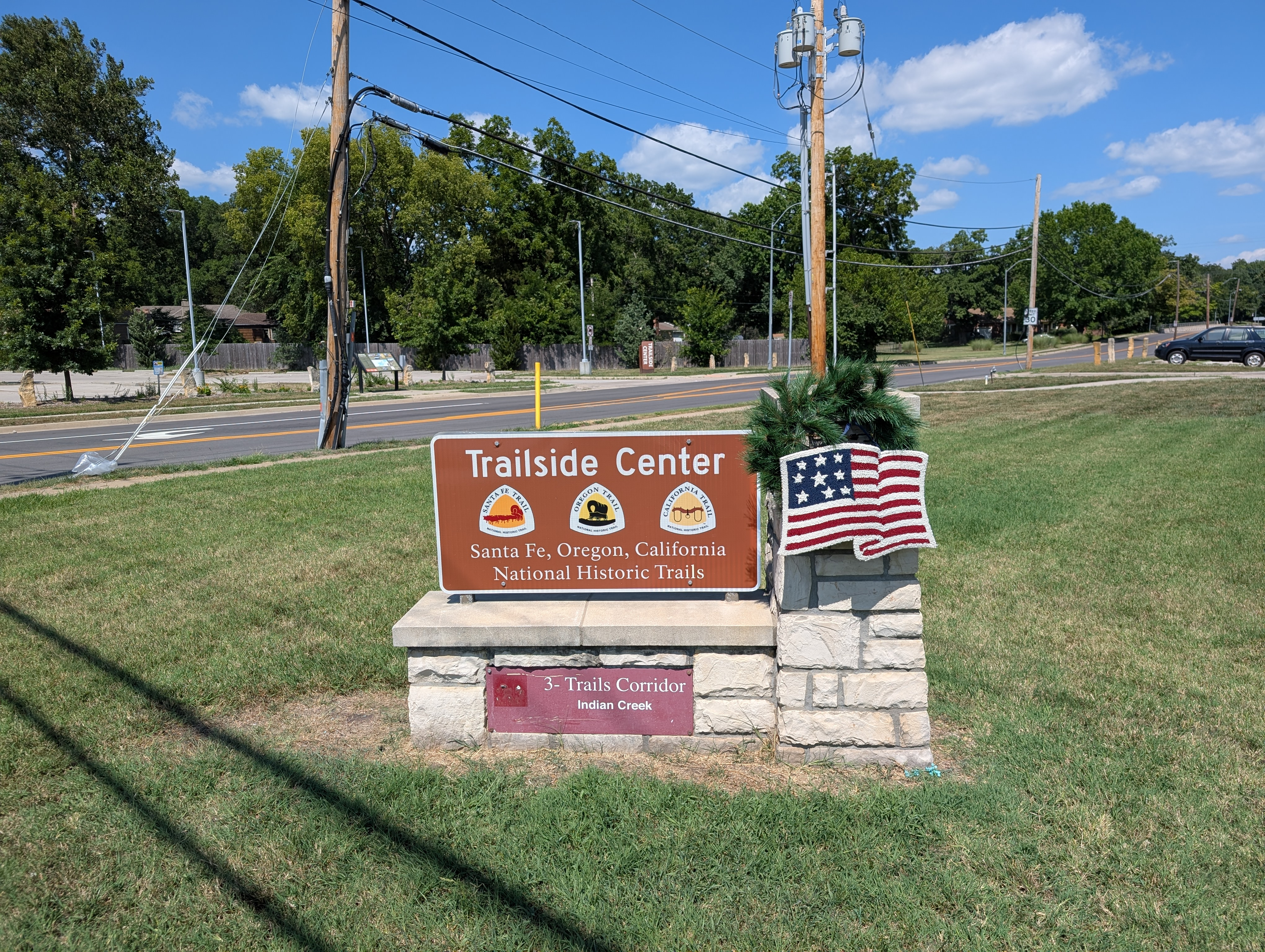
The sign outside the trailside center in Kansas City, Missouri.

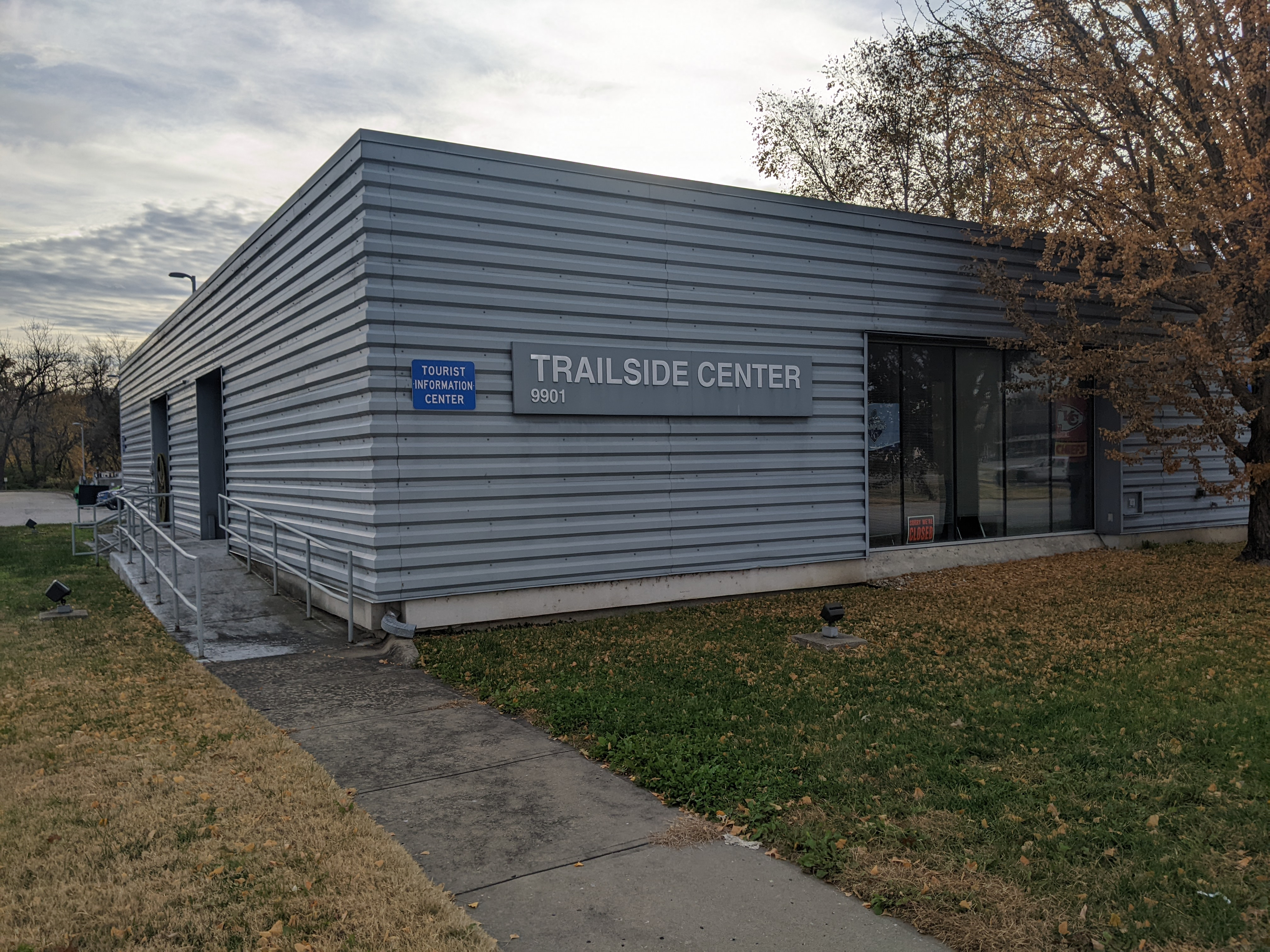
Trailside Center building, as viewed from Holmes Road

The Trailside Center is a tourist center, museum, and community facility in Kansas City, Missouri. The center is located at the intersection of Holmes Road and East 99th Street. Items on display include exhibits of Civil War items related to the Battle of Westport as well as items related to the Santa Fe, Oregon, and California trails. The center is staffed by volunteers. The center also serves as a meeting place for public forums, discussions, and other events.

== See also ==
- List of museums in Missouri
- List of points of interest in Kansas City, Missouri
