= Kansas City Irish Center =

Non-profit organization in Missouri, USA

Coordinates: 39°05′06″N 94°35′08″W

The Kansas City Irish Center, formerly known as the Irish Center of Kansas City, is a non-profit organization in Kansas City, Missouri. The Center opened in Union Station on March 17, 2007 (Saint Patrick's Day). The Center's mission encourages knowledge and appreciation of the Irish and Irish-American community, culture, history, and heritage in the greater Kansas City area and region.

== Events ==
The center hosts many cultural events including:

- Programs on Irish, Irish American, and Celtic topics including culture, arts, music, Irish dance, literature, history and heritage
- Monthly Irish Music jam sessions
- Irish Music classes
- Irish language classes
- Irish knitting, crochet and lace making classes
- Genealogy workshops and individual research assistance

Irish Whiskey tastings and concerts featuring local Irish musicians are two of the more popular events at the Center.

== Exhibits and resources ==
Exhibits and collections include:

- Small exhibit about the history of Kansas City's Irish Community
- 4,000-book John Forest Resource Library, a collection that covers the depth and breadth of Irish culture and history. The library is a resource center, as books can be utilized on-site only.
- Ireland travel information & resources

A small pub and stage will be included in renovations to the building. Drexel Hall currently has an event space that holds up to 500 people, which the Center will use for concerts, speakers, theatre productions and other activities.
