= The Rabbit Hole (museum) =

Immersive children's book museum

The Rabbit hOle
- Established: March 12, 2024
- Location: 919 E 14th Ave, North Kansas City, MO 64116
- Coordinates: 39.1338°N 94.5695°W

The Rabbit hOle is an immersive children's book museum located in North Kansas City, Missouri, United States. It opened in March 2024 and features exhibits based on classic and contemporary children's books. It is the first museum of its kind in the United States.

== History ==
The Rabbit hOle was founded by Pete Cowdin and Deb Pettid. They formerly owned the independent children's bookstore Reading Reptile in Kansas City. They closed the bookstore in 2016 to focus on developing the museum.

The pair transformed a warehouse in North Kansas City's Iron District. It is now a large-scale literary attraction with more exhibits being added each year.

== Exhibits and programs ==
The warehouse where The Rabbit hOle is located is approximately 150,000 square feet. Some of the works featured include Goodnight Moon, Caps for Sale, Frog and Toad, Strega Nona, My Father's Dragon, Harry the Dirty Dog, and Where the Sidewalk Ends. The museum also includes an exhibit gallery, bookstore, print shop, makerspace, story lab, resource library, and an event space. The exhibits are designed by an in-house team of fabricators, including welders, carpenters, painters, textile specialists, and other artists. The museum holds the rights to more than 70 literary works represented within the museum.

== Reception ==
Before its opening, The New York Times included The Rabbit hOle in its "52 Places to Go in 2024" feature. In 2024, Time included The Rabbit Hole in its list of notable destinations, describing it as an immersive literary museum that allows visitors to physically enter environments inspired by children's books.

Local and regional media outlets have highlighted the museum's innovative approach to literacy, storytelling, and exhibit design, with several publications describing it as a first-of-its-kind attraction.

== Gallery ==
Books frozen in time

Infoboard at the entrance to the Rabbit Hole

Rabbit trail
