= 18th and Vine =

- 18th and Vine Historic District
- U.S. National Register of Historic Places
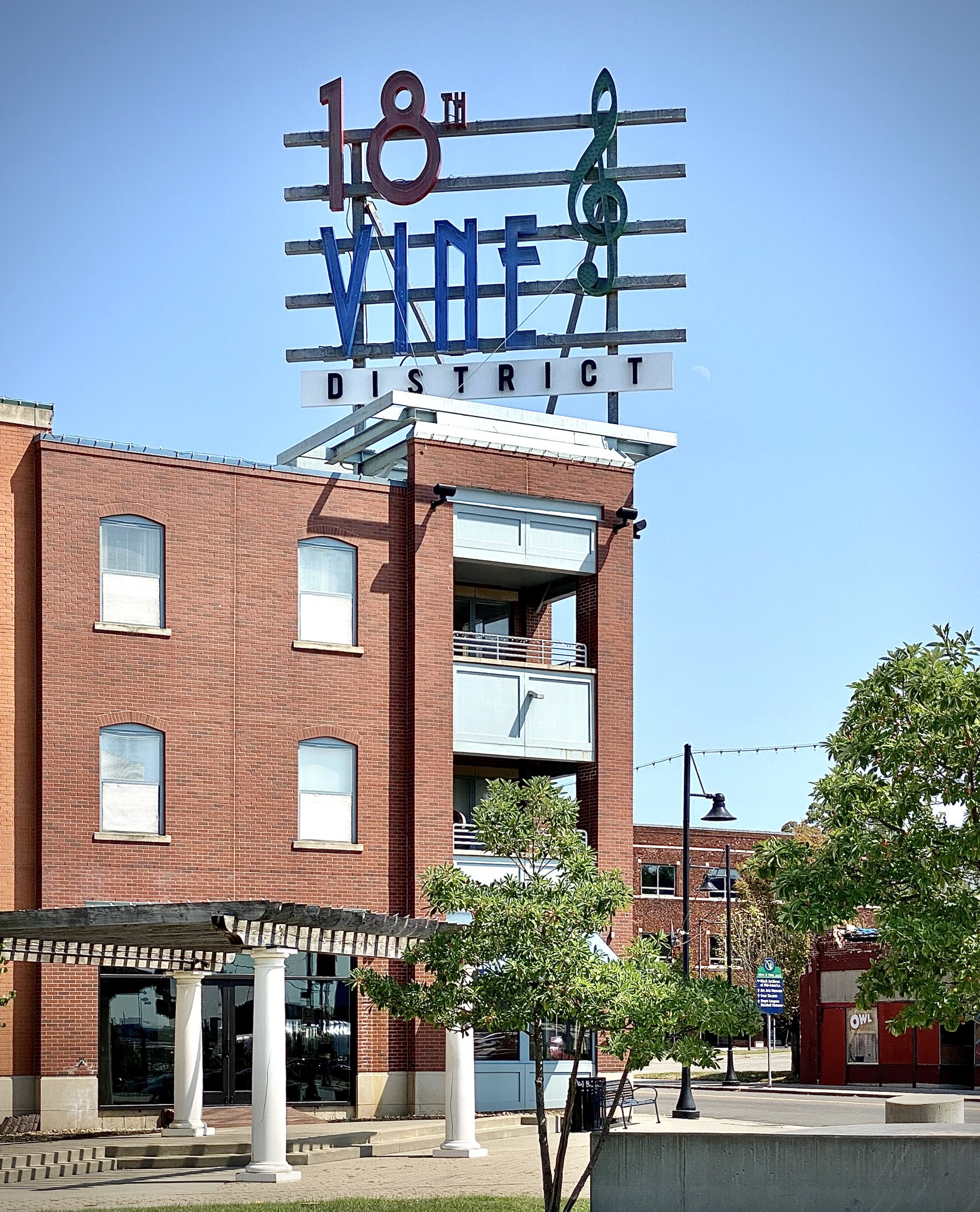
- Location: Roughly bounded by 18th St., Woodland Ave., 19th St., and The Paseo in Kansas City, Missouri
- Coordinates: 39°05′20″N 94°33′40″W
- Area: 9 acres (3.6 ha)
- MPS: 18th and Vine Area of Kansas City MPS
- NRHP reference No.: 84004142
- Added to NRHP: September 9, 1991

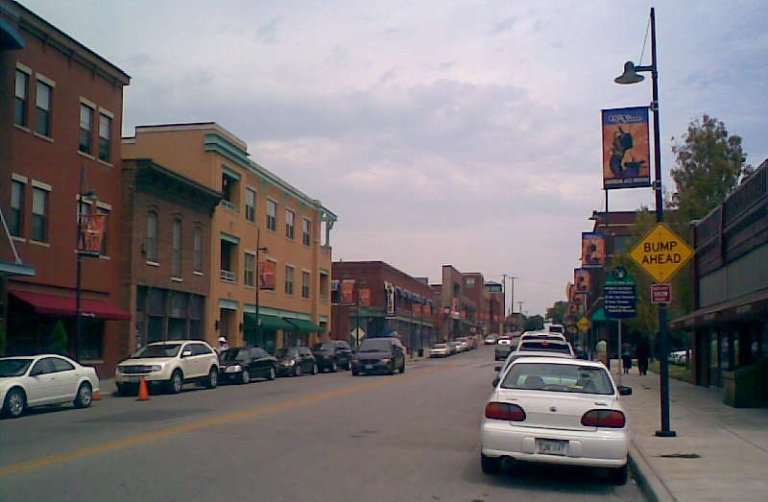
18th Street businesses

18th and Vine is a neighborhood of Kansas City, Missouri. It is internationally recognized as a historical point of origin of jazz music and a historic hub of African-American businesses. Along with Basin Street in New Orleans, Beale Street in Memphis, 52nd Street in New York City, and Central Avenue in Los Angeles, the 18th and Vine area fostered a new style of jazz. Kansas City jazz is a riff-based and blues-influenced sound developed during jam sessions in the neighborhood's crowded clubs. Many jazz musicians of the 1930s and 1940s lived or got started here, including Charlie Parker. Due to this legacy, U.S. Representative Emanuel Cleaver said 18th and Vine is America's third most recognized street after Broadway and Hollywood Boulevard.

In 1991, the national historic district encompassing 35 contributing buildings was listed on the National Register of Historic Places.

== History ==
18th and Vine is east of Downtown Kansas City and is the metropolitan area's historic center of African American culture. In 1991, the national historic district encompassing 35 contributing buildings was listed on the National Register of Historic Places.

In the 1990s, parts of the film Kansas City were filmed there, and façades left from the movie remained on most of the dilapidated buildings until the end of the decade.

The 18th and Vine neighborhood includes the Mutual Musicians Foundation, the Gem Theater, the long-time offices of African-American newspaper The Call, the Blue Room jazz club, the American Jazz Museum, the Negro Leagues Baseball Museum, Smaxx Restaurant, a restaurant inside the Juke House and Blues Club, and several apartments and condos. The Historic Lincoln Building serves as a hub of professional and business activity in the Black community, restored in the early 1980s by the Black Economic Union of Kansas City.

Six blocks to the north, the former intersection of 12th Street and Vine is the subject of Leiber & Stoller's song "Kansas City" in 1952, adapted by Little Willie Littlefield as "Kansas City Lovin'" and adapted by Little Richard, Wilbert Harrison, and the Beatles. Vine Street no longer intersects with 12th Street, where a housing project was built over it. The city has since erected a street sign in a park near the housing project to mark the former 12th and Vine.

The neighborhood has long suffered epidemic blight, with huge portions being juggled for decades between unproductive owners and their countless colossal visions and broken promises of rehabilitation. It has been the focus of more than $30 million of civic investment since the late 1980s, but redevelopment has struggled. In 2001, the Kansas City area manager of Bank of America proposed a $46 million redevelopment of 96 acres of blight across the District but canceled in 2005 ahead of the global crash of 2008, selling much of it to KC native millionaire Ephren W. Taylor II who likened his invisible investments to the comic book antihero The Phantom. Actually a con artist, Taylor promised in 2006 to develop his large Jazz District property into 42 homes plus a community center or museum within the nearby historic city workhouse castle, but was instead convicted of a Ponzi scheme defrauding Black churchgoers of millions of dollars and then federally imprisoned. From 2016 to 2020, the city government, community, and corporate investors have conducted many proposals for rehabilitation of the historic blight, including a massive $150 million project pending a federal investigation into corruption.

== See also ==
- Wheatley-Provident Hospital, historical limestone building built 1903 near the 18th and Vine neighborhood
- Lykins, Kansas City, an adjacent neighborhood
- List of neighborhoods in Kansas City, Missouri
