= Neighborhoods of Kansas City, Missouri =

The list of neighborhoods of Kansas City, Missouri has nearly 240 neighborhoods. The list includes only Kansas City, Missouri and not the entire Kansas City metropolitan area, such as Kansas City, Kansas.

== Kansas City, Missouri ==
Kansas City, Missouri has nearly 240 neighborhoods including Downtown, 18th and Vine, River Market, Crossroads, Country Club Plaza, Westport, the new Power and Light District, and several suburbs. The Neighborhood & Community Services Department of the City of Kansas City, Missouri maintains an official registry of neighborhood associations, many of which overlap, and a map of neighborhoods.

=== CBD-Downtown ===
- CBD-Downtown

=== Greater Downtown ===
- 18th and Vine
- Beacon Hill-McFeders
- Columbus Park
- Crossroads
- East Village
- Hospital Hill
- Library District
- Longfellow/Dutch Hill
- Quality Hill
- River Market
- Union Hill
- West Side

=== East Side ===
- Ashland Ridge
- Blue Hills
- Blue Valley
- Boulevard Village
- Brown Estates
- Country Valley-Hawthorne Square
- Cunningham Ridge
- Dunbar
- East 23rd Street P.A.C.
- Eastwood Hills
- Glen Lake
- Glen Oaks
- Ingleside
- Ivanhoe
- Key Coalition
- Knoches Park
- Leeds
- Mount Cleveland
- Oak Park
- Palestine
- Parkview
- Riss Lake
- Santa Fe
- Sheraton Estates
- Stayton Meadows
- Sterling Acres
- Sterling Gardens
- Vineyard
- Vineyard Estates
- Washington-Wheatley
- Wendell Phillips

=== Midtown-Westport ===
- Center City
- Coleman Highlands
- Hanover Place
- Hyde Park
- Manheim Park
- Mount Hope
- Old Hyde Park Historic District, Inc.
- Old Westport
- Plaza Westport
- Roanoke
- Southmoreland
- Squier Park
- Valentine
- Volker
- Westport

=== Northeast ===
- Forgotten Homes
- Independence Plaza
- Indian Mound
- Lykins
- North Blueridge
- Northeast Industrial District
- Paseo West
- Pendleton Heights
- Scarritt Point
- Sheffield

=== Northland ===
- Antioch Acres
- Barry Harbour
- Barry Heights
- Barry Woods/ Park Hill
- Beacon Hill
- Beulmar Acres
- Birmingham Bottoms
- Bradford Place
- Breen Hills
- Briarcliff
- Briarcliff West
- Chaumiere
- Chouteau Estates
- Claymont
- Claymont North
- Clayton
- Colonial Square
- Cooley Highlands
- Country Club Estates-Big Shoal
- Coves North
- Crestview Homes Association 1
- Davidson (formerly Highland Gardens)
- Dearfield
- Foxwoods-Carriage Hills
- Gashland
- Glenhaven
- Gracemor-Randolph Corners
- Greenwood
- Harlem
- Highland View
- Hill Haven
- Holiday Hills
- Jefferson Highlands
- KCI
- Lakeview Terrace
- Linden Park
- Line Creek-Northern Heights
- Maple Park
- Maple Park West
- Milton
- Minneville
- Meadowbrook Heights
- Nashua
- New Mark
- Northhaven Gardens
- Outer Gashland-Nashua
- Parkdale-Walden
- Park Forest
- Park Hill South/ South Platte
- Park Plaza
- Platte Brook North
- Platte Ridge
- Platte Woods
- Prairie Point-Wildberry
- Ravenwood-Somerset
- Riss Lake
- River Forest
- River View
- Royal Oaks North
- Sherrydale
- Sherwood Estates
- Shoal Creek
- Staley Farms
- Tanglewood-Regency North
- The Coves
- Winnetonka
- Winnwood-Sunnybrook
- Winnwood Gardens

=== Plaza area ===
- Brookside
- Countryside
- Country Club
- Country Club Plaza
- Country Club District
- Park Central-Research
- West Plaza
- Westport
- South Plaza
- Sunset Hill
- Rockhill
- Westwood Park

=== South Kansas City ===
- 49-63 Coalition
- Armour Fields
- Armour Hills
- Bannister Acres
- Battleflood Heights
- Boone Hills
- Blue Hills Estates
- Blue Vue Hills
- Blue Ridge Farm
- Bridlespur
- Calico Farms
- Citadel
- Coachlight Square
- Country Lane Estates
- Crestwood
- Crossgates
- East Swope Highlands
- Fairlane
- Foxcroft-Glen Arbor
- Foxtown East
- Foxtown West
- Hickman Mills
- Hickman Mills South
- Hidden Valley
- Highview Estates
- Hillcrest
- Holmes Park
- Kirkside
- Knobtown
- Lea Manor
- Legacy East
- Lewis Heights
- Linden Hills-Indian Heights
- Little Blue Valley
- Loma Vista
- Longview
- Marlborough East
- Marlborough Heights
- Marlborough Pride
- Martin City
- Mission Lake
- Morningside
- Neighbors United For Action
- Newcastle
- New Santa Fe
- Noble-Gregory Ridge
- Oakwood
- Oak Meyer Garden
- Park Central-Research Hospital
- Red Bridge
- Red Bridge South
- Richards Gebaur
- Robandee-Fairwood
- Robandee South
- Rolling Meadows
- Romanelli West
- Royal Oaks
- Ruskin Heights
- Ruskin Hills
- Santa Fe Hills
- Sechrest
- Self-Help Neighborhood Council
- Stratford Estates
- Strupwood
- Swope Park Campus
- Swope Park-Winchester
- Swope Parkway-Elmwood
- Terrace Lake Gardens
- Tri-Blenheim
- Timber Valley
- Tower Homes
- Town Fork Creek
- Troost Avenue Lawn
- Unity Ridge
- Verona Hills
- Waldo
- Waldo West
- Walnut Grove
- Ward Estates
- Ward Parkway
- Ward Parkway Plaza
- Western Hills
- White Oak
- Woodbridge
- Wornall Homestead
