= Hyde Park, Kansas City =

Neighborhood of Hyde Park in Kansas City

Hyde Park
- Neighborhood
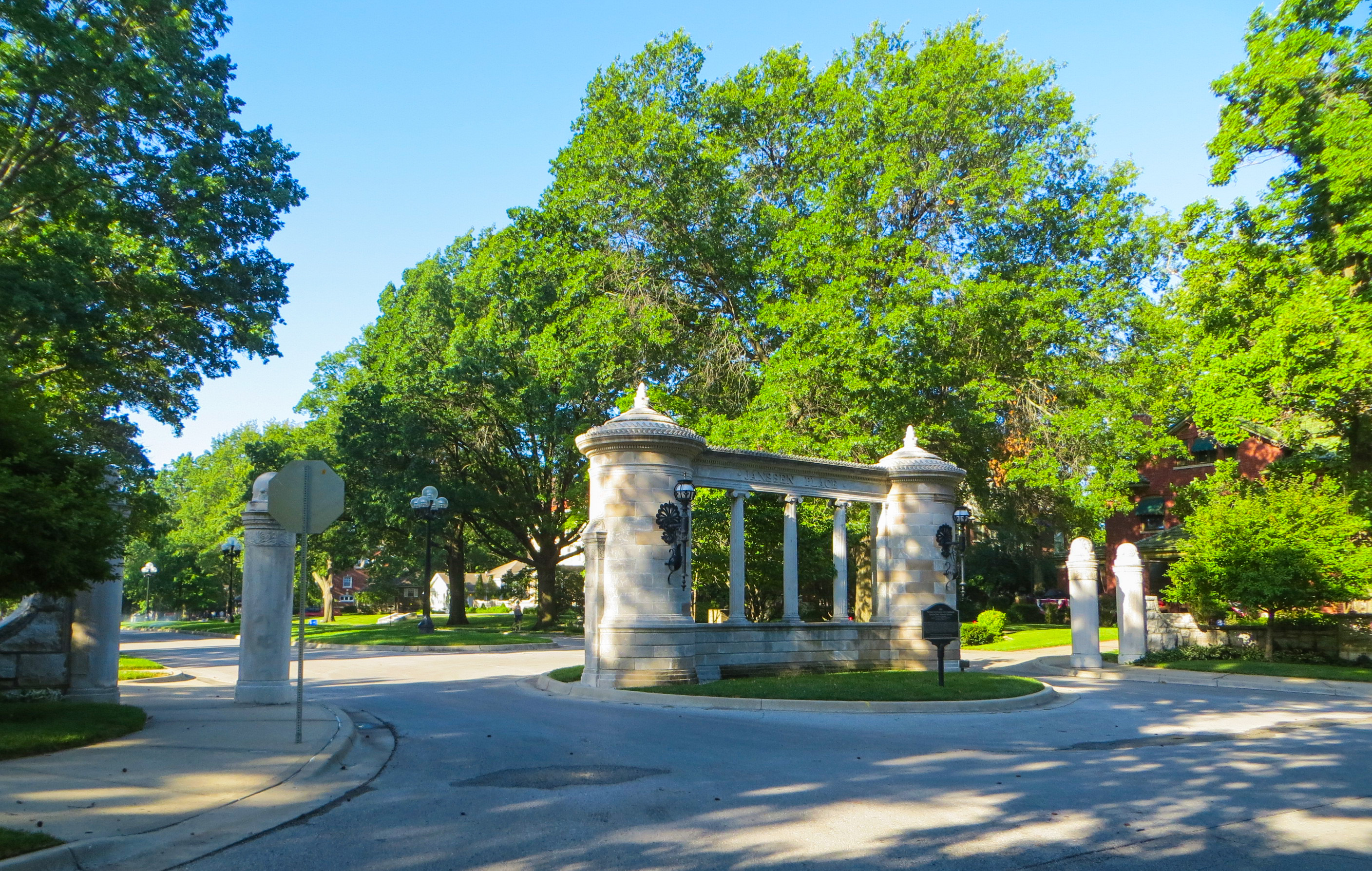
- Janssen Place in Hyde Park, July 2016
- Interactive map of Hyde Park
- Coordinates: 39°03′23″N 94°34′36″W
- Country: United States
- State: Missouri
- City: Kansas City

Area
  - Total: 0.75 sq mi (1.9 km^{2})

Population (2020)
  - Total: 3,762
  - Density: 5,000/sq mi (1,900/km^{2})
- ZIP Codes: 64109
- Area code: Area code 816
- Website: https://www.hydeparkkc.org/
- Hyde Park
- U.S. National Register of Historic Places
- U.S. Historic district
- Location: Kansas City, MO
- Architectural style: Queen Anne Prairie School; Craftsman; Kansas City Shirtwaist; Folk Victorian; Neo-Georgian Colonial Revival; Classical Revival Tudor Revival
- NRHP reference No.: 80002364
- Added to NRHP: November 21, 1980
- South Hyde Park
- U.S. National Register of Historic Places
- U.S. Historic district
- Location: Kansas City, MO
- Architectural style: Queen Anne Prairie School; Craftsman; Kansas City Shirtwaist; Folk Victorian; Neo-Georgian Colonial Revival; Classical Revival Tudor Revival
- NRHP reference No.: 07001186
- Added to NRHP: November 14, 2007
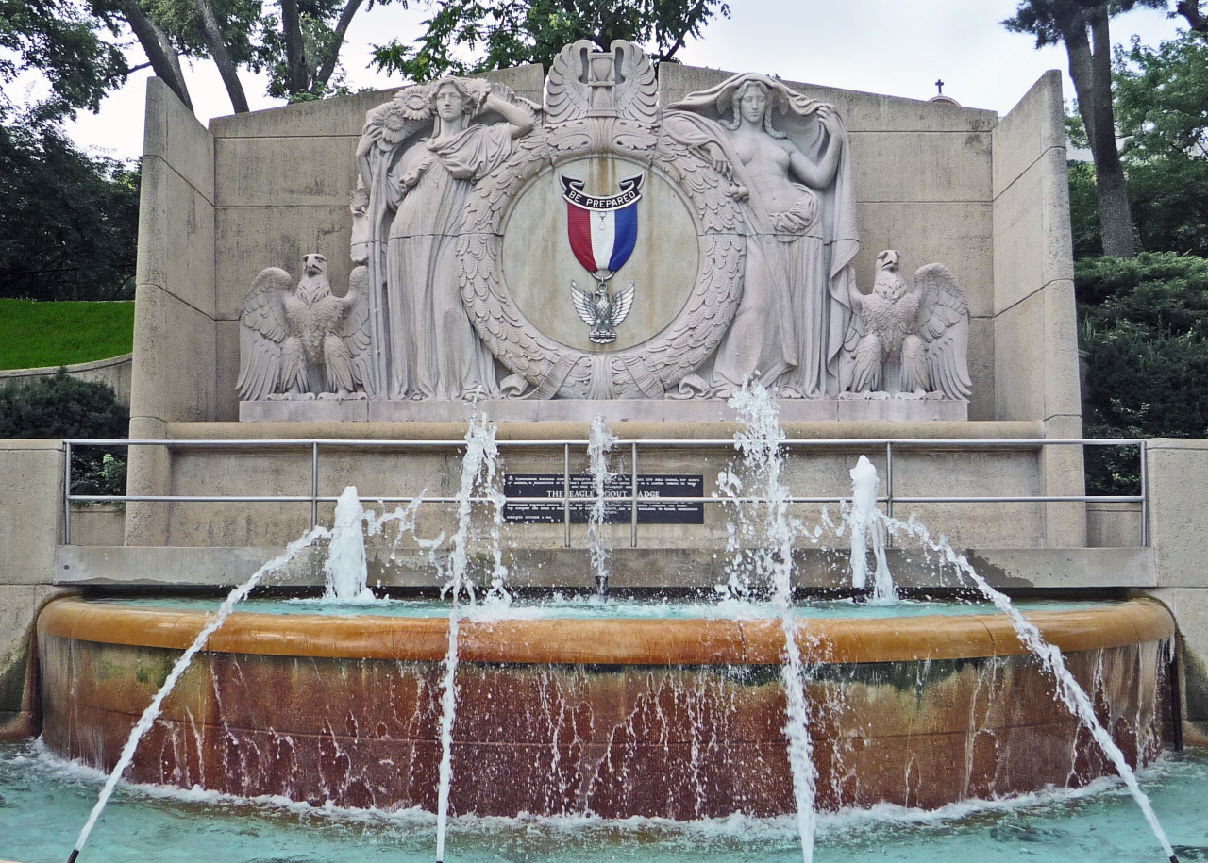
- The Eagle Scout Memorial Fountain crowns Hyde Park at the intersection of 39th Street and Gillham Road
- Interactive map of Hyde Park, Kansas City
- Type: Urban park
- Location: Kansas City, Missouri, United States
- Coordinates: 39.057°N 94.579°W
- Area: 7.46 acres (30,200 m^{2}; 0.01166 mi^{2})
- Created: 1888; 138 years ago
- Designer: George Kessler
- Owner: City of Kansas City, Missouri
- Website: kcparks.org

Hyde Park is a historic residential neighborhood and city park in Kansas City, Missouri.

== Neighborhood ==
The historic neighborhood extends from Linwood Boulevard (32nd Street) at its northern boundary to Emanuel Cleaver II Boulevard (47th Street) at its south, and is bounded on the west and east by Gillham Road and Troost Avenue, respectively.

Hyde Park is composed of three subdivisions: North Hyde Park, Central Hyde Park, and South Hyde Park, the latter two of which are listed on the National Register of Historic Places. North Hyde Park and Central Hyde Park are separated by Armour Boulevard (35th Street), and 39th Street forms the border between Central Hyde Park and South Hyde Park.

It is bordered by the neighborhoods of Longfellow to the north; Center City, Squier Park, and Manheim Park (part of the Troost Corridor) to the east; Rockhill to the south; Southmoreland to the southwest and west; and Broadway Gillham and Hanover Place to the west.

Of the approximately 1,500 historic homes in the area, 291 in Central Hyde Park and 767 in South Hyde Park contribute specifically to the historic district.

== History ==
Situated at the confluence of two creek valleys, the area that is now Hyde Park served as a natural watering hole for pioneers heading west on the Santa Fe Trail. Caves and natural springs made the area an ideal overnight spot for travelers.

The real estate boom of the mid-1880s saw the first mention of a "Hyde Park" in Kansas City. Originally platted in the present-day neighborhood of Hanover Place in 1886, equidistant from the growing cities of Westport and Kansas City, the area soon grew to include land east of what is now Gillham Road. Designed and built as an exclusive subdivision by and for the elite of the time, the first homeowners were architects, lumber barons, railroad magnates, congressmen, and ministers of Kansas City high society. The neighborhood was annexed by the City of Westport in 1891, which was in turn absorbed by Kansas City in 1897. George Kessler was engaged to develop a neighborhood park, laying the groundwork of the City Beautiful movement of boulevards and parks. Most of the houses in the area were completed by 1920.

In the wake of World War II, a housing shortage coupled with many original occupants moving or downsizing led most homes to be divided into multifamily dwellings or apartments. Luxury garden apartments and duplexes were built on undeveloped lots to stabilize the need for housing in the area. For several decades, a large portion of residential, central Kansas City was referred to as "Hyde Park" without reference to subdivisions, in acknowledgement and memory of its waning social primacy. Beginning in the 1970s, a new market for antique homes and unique architecture began to revitalize the neighborhood. Speculative young professionals, attracted by low prices, began to repurchase and refurbish the homes as single-family dwellings. An estimated one-third of homes were acquired by new owners between 1975 and 1977 alone.

The Hyde Park Neighborhood Association, founded in 1969, has helped establish the legacy of the historic district. In addition to renewing the neighborhood's identity, it also helps maintain the area by participating in special projects and landscaping.

== City parks ==
A neighborhood park, Hyde Park, stretches south along Gillham Road from 36th to 39th streets before following Harrison Parkway northeast to its terminus at 37th Terrace and Harrison Boulevard. A commemorative plaque at 36th and Gillham commemorates the 17-hole Kenwood Golf Links, Kansas City's first golf course, established in the park by Stanley Young in 1894.

Gillham Park, shared with the adjacent neighborhoods of Southmoreland and Rockhill, follows Gillham Road south from 39th Street to Brush Creek Boulevard (46th Street). Amenities include tennis courts, baseball diamonds, and a playground.

== Notable mentions ==
- The Bellerive, once a hotel on Armour Boulevard, gained notoriety after opening the Casbah Room, a lounge that attracted headliners such as Billie Holiday and Liberace.
- Walt Disney lived in Hyde Park between homes in the Kansas City East Side and California.
- The landscape architect for the Janssen Place section of Hyde Park was George A. Mathews, who in 1903 also designed the residence in the Roanoke neighborhood that became the Thomas Hart Benton Home.
- The four-story, co-educational grade school campus of Notre Dame de Sion overlooks Hyde and Gillham Parks from a hill at 38th and Locust Streets.
- The Eagle Scout Memorial Fountain located at 39th Street and Gillham Road was dedicated in 1968. The memorial was sculpted in 1910 by Adolph Alexander Weinman and previously graced an entrance of New York City's Penn Station before its relocation in 1963.
- Pilgrim Chapel is a "miniature Gothic church" at Gillham Road and 38th Street. Built in 1942 as the Pilgrim Lutheran Church for the Deaf, today it is a non-denominational space for the community.
