= Southmoreland =

Neighborhood of Kansas City, Missouri

Coordinates: 39°02′57″N 94°34′59″W

- Neighborhood of Kansas City
- Interactive map of Southmoreland
- Country: United States
- State: Missouri
- City: Kansas City

Area
  - Total: 0.514 sq mi (1.33 km^{2})

Population (2017)
  - Total: 78,700
  - Density: 153,000/sq mi (59,100/km^{2})

Race/Ethnicity
  - White: 71.8%
  - Hispanic: 8.5%
  - Black: 7.0%
  - Asian: 2.6%
  - Other: 2.4%

Economics
  - Median income: $50,358
- ZIP Codes: 64110, 64111, 64112
- Area code: 816

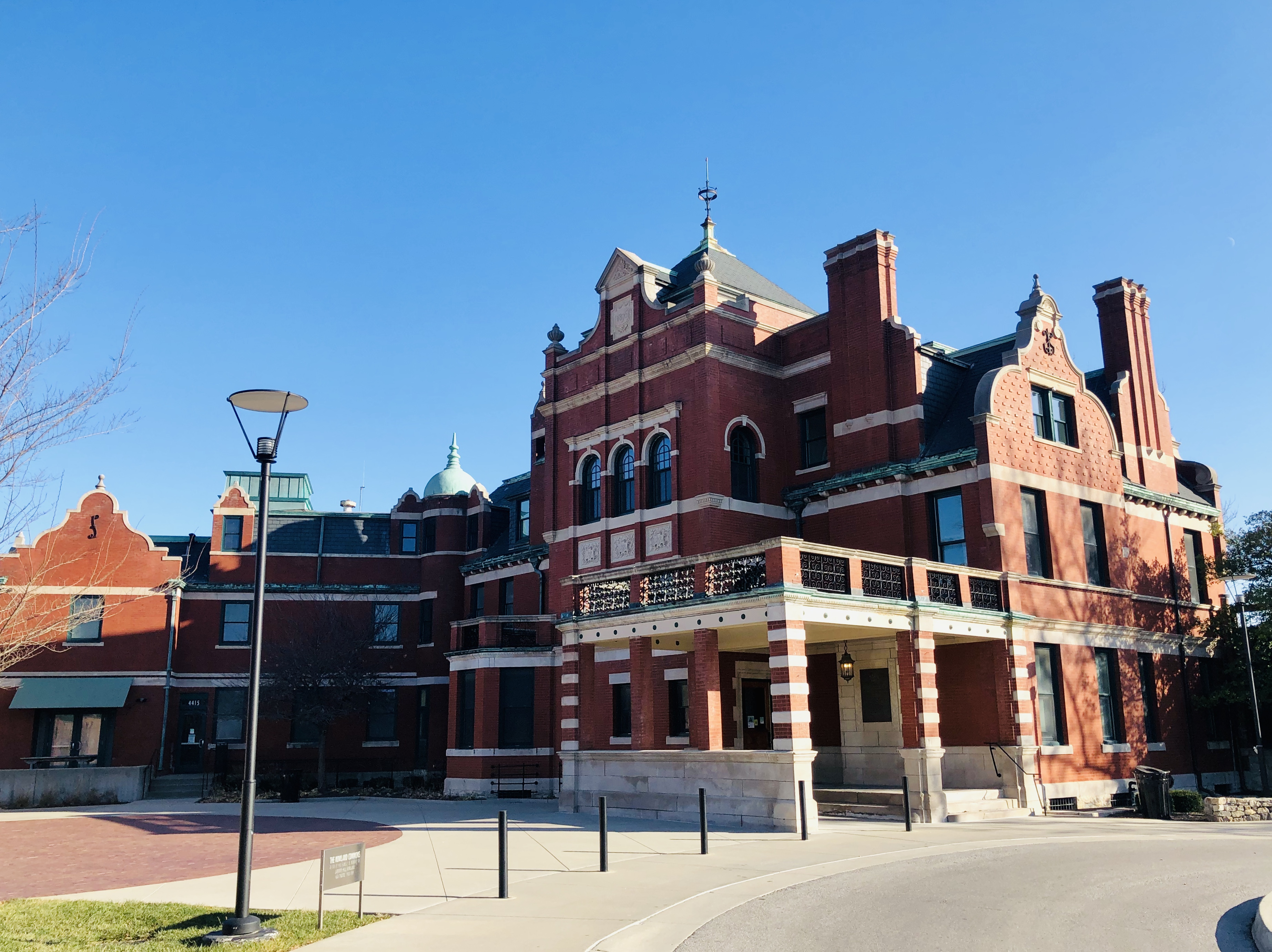
Kansas City Art Institute, Warwick Boulevard, Southmoreland

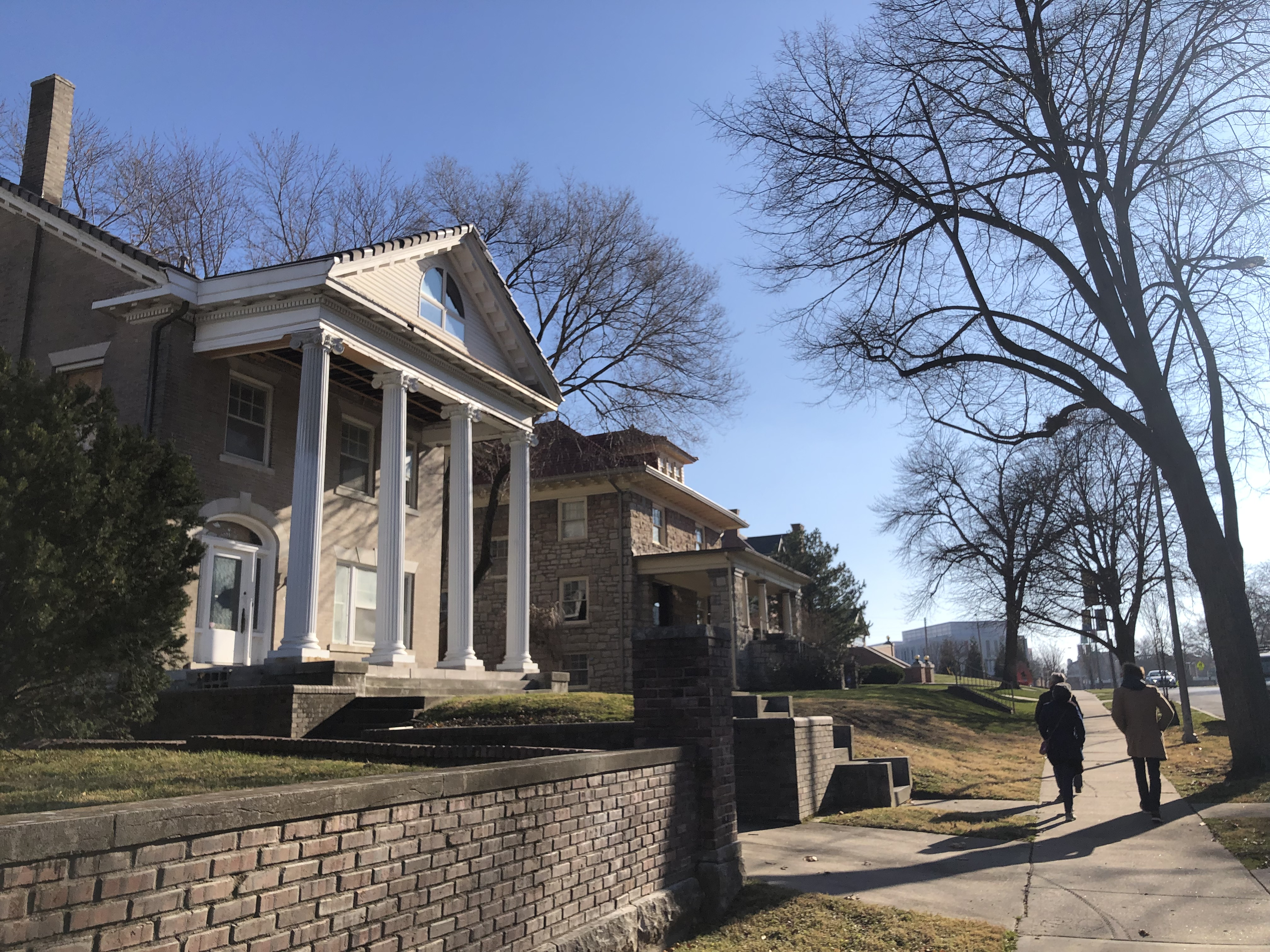
Warwick Boulevard, Southmoreland

Southmoreland is a neighborhood of Kansas City, Missouri. It hosts the Nelson-Atkins Museum of Art, the Kemper Museum of Contemporary Art, and the Kansas City Art Institute. Southmoreland is located between 39th Street on the north (bordering Hanover Place and Central Hyde Park), Rockhill, and Gillham Road on the east (bordering South Hyde Park), Emanuel Cleaver II Boulevard on the south (bordering Country Club Plaza and Park Central) and Main Street on the west (bordering Plaza Westport and Old Westport). Since 2019, a streetcar extension from Union Station to University of Missouri–Kansas City has been completed, there has been new real estate development along Main Street.

== History ==
The Southmoreland section of the Rockhill District was conceived in the late 19th century by Kansas City Star publisher and real estate developer William Rockhill Nelson and mining magnate August Meyer, as Kansas City's neighborhood of palatial mansions. Nelson acquired the area and donated it to the city, first platted by W.B. Clark as South Moreland Addition. Nelson and Meyer planned an extension of City Beautiful movement with naturalistic landscaping, open parkland, native stone fencing, and curved roadways lined with elm trees. It evolved around a natural ravine, through which a small brook runs in rainy times. The venerated architecture team of Frederick Law Olmsted (the "father of American Landscape Architecture") and Calvert Vaux intended the landscaping of the park and adjacent areas to imitate the look and feel of their previous designs around Central Park, Riverside Park, and surrounding neighborhoods in New York City. The plan accentuated the turf, water, and rock, using gentle, sprawling lawns, winding pathways, and natural woodlands.

Framed by Nelson's baronial mansion, Oak Hall, and August Meyer’s palace, Marburg on Warwick Boulevard, Southmoreland has evolved into an eclectic mix of Colonial Revival mansions, Arts & Crafts style homes, and Colonnade luxury apartment buildings, many with native limestone accents. In the early 20th century, a streetcar line was built between Downtown Kansas City and the neighborhood, which began to attract working-class families, so some of the larger mansions were converted into apartments. Beyond the large museums and institutions of higher education, Southmoreland has several artists’ studios, shops, and galleries. In 2009, Southmoreland was voted as one of eight neighborhoods nationwide as the "Best Old House Neighborhoods: Editor's Pick" by This Old House.

Since 2019, the neighborhood has attracted real estate development interest following the announced expansion of the KC Streetcar, which now extends from Union Station to the University of Missouri–Kansas City (UMKC), on the perimeter of Southmoreland.

== See also ==
- Architecture of Kansas City
