= Linwood Boulevard (Kansas City, Missouri) =

Thoroughfare in Kansas City, Missouri

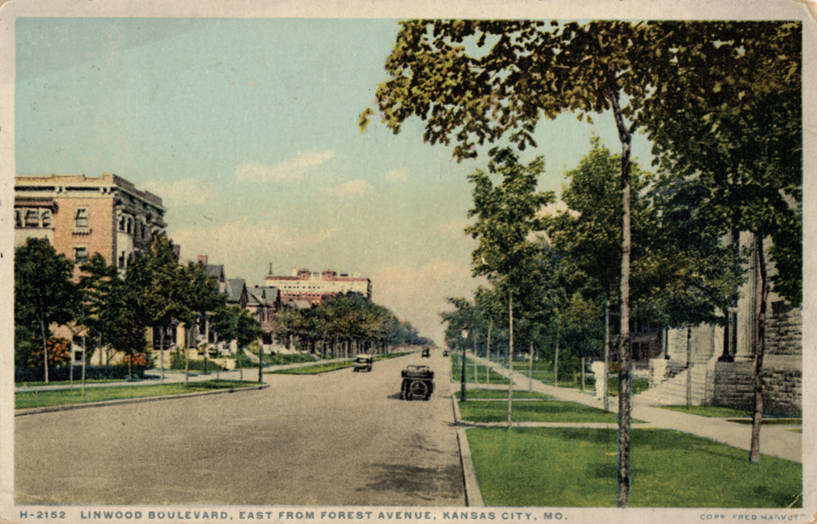
- Postcard of Linwood Boulevard
- Interactive map of Linwood Boulevard
- Namesake: Linden trees
- Length: 3.8 mi (6.1 km)
- Coordinates: 39°4′3.86″N 94°33′37.37″W
- East: Van Brunt Boulevard
- West: Broadway Boulevard

Other
- Known for: City Beautiful movement
- Type: Boulevard
- Location: Kansas City, Missouri, United States
- Coordinates: 39.067737°N 94.543712°W
- Area: 51.19 acres (0.2072 km^{2}; 0.07998 mi^{2})
- Designer: George Kessler
- Owner: City of Kansas City, Missouri
- Website: kcparks.org
- Linwood Boulevard
- U.S. Historic district – Contributing property
- Coordinates: 39°4′4.1″N 94°32′57.7″W
- Area: 694.2 acres (2.809 km^{2}; 1.0847 mi^{2})
- Built: 1899
- Architect: George Kessler
- Architectural style: City Beautiful; Landscape architecture Beaux-Arts
- Part of: Kansas City Parks and Boulevard System (ID14000931)
- Added to NRHP: June 17, 2016

Linwood Boulevard is a boulevard and major east–west street in Kansas City, Missouri, United States. Linwood begins at Broadway Boulevard in the Valentine and Old Hyde Park neighborhoods and travels 3.8 miles east through Midtown to Van Brunt Boulevard near Interstate 70 in the Kansas City East Side. For much of its length, it creates a high-density corridor with 31st Street, another major street running parallel one block north. It continues west of Broadway Boulevard as 33rd Street past Metropolitan Community College-Penn Valley. Linwood Boulevard is one of the few named east–west streets in the Kansas City grid south of the Missouri River.

== History ==
The portion of Linwood Boulevard between The Paseo and Benton Boulevard was originally designated in George Kessler's 1893 City Beautiful proposal for the Kansas City Parks and Boulevard System, serving as part of the route from Penn Valley Park to The Grove. It is named after a stand of linden trees which stood near a school house at Woodland Avenue in the late 19th century. Designed to closely follow the southern boundary of the City of Kansas City, Missouri, Linwood Boulevard was then rapidly annexed into the growing city. In 1897, the portion from State Line Road to Indiana Avenue was annexed with much of modern-day Midtown followed by the remainder of the East Side in 1909.

In keeping with its importance to and intentional plans from the city, Linwood Boulevard became a balanced center of commerce, worship, and residence for Midtown. Many prominent social societies also chose to build their meeting places on the boulevard for the sites of their headquarters, leading to a dense patchwork of history including two districts and 13 properties on the National Register of Historic Places.

The Old Hyde Park West Historic District predates the establishment of Linwood Boulevard as a part of the Parks and Boulevard System. It has been a residential area since 1887, and most buildings date to World War I and the Interwar period. The Santa Fe Place Historic District, built on a portion of the Santa Fe Trail, was established in 1902 as the first local attempt at an architecturally controlled residential neighborhood. Most homes were built prior to 1925.

The Kansas City Athenaeum was built as a meeting hall for the women's social club of the same name in 1915. At the time, it was the fifth-largest women's club in the United States. It is now used primarily as an event space. The Ivanhoe Masonic Temple, dedicated in 1922 and demolished in 1999, served as the primary meeting hall for and monument to the local Masonic order, Ivanhoe Masonic Lodge No. 446. When construction completed, the seven-story structure befit the largest order of Freemasons west of the Mississippi River. The Kansas City Scottish Rite Temple was built in 1930 by another local Masonic order, the Scottish Rite. After the Great Depression, the order merged with the larger Ivanhoe Masonic Lodge and sold the building. It is now an event space.

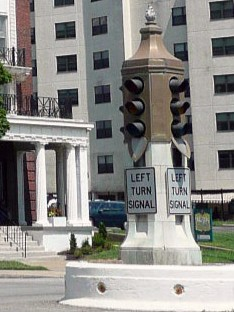
Kansas City's first traffic signal

A traffic signal marks at the intersection of Linwood Boulevard and The Paseo was designed by Edward Buehler Delk and installed in 1931. It was the first controlled intersection in Kansas City, marking the coming reliance on the automobile and has become a local icon due to its unique structure and placement.

Walt Bodine (1940 – 2012), a fixture of talk radio on Kansas City's NPR member station KCUR, grew up at the corner of Linwood Boulevard and Troost Avenue. He often referenced memories of his boyhood home on his radio program.

In 1955, Ray Lamar opened a donut shop in a converted gas station on Linwood Boulevard. The LaMar's Donuts store remained a simple, low-tech landmark on the boulevard even as branches expanded through the Midwest and it drew national attention from Jay Leno and Calvin Trillin.

Linwood Boulevard west of Gillham Road first appears on maps published by the Missouri State Highway Commission in 1926. From 1934 to 1966, U.S. Route 40 and several of its special routes ran concurrent to the 31st Street / Linwood Boulevard corridor. Through 1963, Linwood Boulevard was bannered as U.S. Route 40 from Van Brunt Boulevard west to The Paseo and as U.S. Route 40 Optional ("OPT 40" on maps and road signs) between The Paseo and Main Street. 31st Street was bannered as U.S. Route 40 City between Troost Avenue and The Paseo in 1936 and 1937, and as U.S. Route 40 Alternate ("ALT 40") between McGee Street and Van Brunt Boulevard from 1938 to 1965. U.S. 40 was transitioned away from Linwood Boulevard in 1964 and from 31st Street in 1966 in favor of the newly completed I-70. As a result, the boulevard lost much of its greenspace "in keeping with the stewardship of the boulevards and to meet contemporary needs," reflecting the transition from carriages to automobiles foreseen by George Kessler. However, many original trees and plantings remain.

In 1974, Linwood Boulevard was included in the American Society of Civil Engineers' selection of the Kansas City Park and Boulevard System as a National Historic Civil Engineering Landmark. It was also honored in part when the entire system was placed on the National Register of Historic Places in 2016.

== Points of interest ==
- Metropolitan Community College-Penn Valley, located at western terminus of Linwood Boulevard at Broadway Boulevard.
- Cristo Rey Kansas City High School, located at 211 W Linwood Boulevard.
- The Old Hyde Park West Historic District, located south of Linwood Boulevard between Central Street and Baltimore Avenue.
- Drexel Hall, located at 3301 Baltimore Avenue at Linwood Boulevard.
- Gates Bar-B-Q, located at 3205 Main Street at Linwood Boulevard.
- The former site of the first LaMar's Donuts, located at 240 E Linwood Boulevard.
- North Hyde Park, part of the Hyde Park neighborhood coalition, located along Linwood Boulevard between Gillham Plaza and Troost Avenue.
- The Kansas City Athenaeum, located at 900 E Linwood Boulevard.
- Kansas City Police Department Central Patrol, located at 1200 E Linwood Boulevard.
- The former Kansas City Scottish Rite Temple, located at 1330 E Linwood Boulevard.
- The first traffic signal in Kansas City, designed by Edward Buehler Delk, located at the intersection of Linwood Boulevard and The Paseo.
- U.S. Route 71, located beneath Linwood Boulevard between Michigan Avenue and Euclid Avenue.
- The site of the former Ivanhoe Masonic Temple, located at 2301 E Linwood Boulevard.
- The Santa Fe Place Historic District, located north of Linwood Boulevard between Prospect Avenue and Cleveland Avenue.
- Central High School, located at 3221 Indiana Avenue along Linwood Boulevard.
- The Kansas City VA Medical Center, located at 4801 E Linwood Boulevard.
- Interstate 70, located near the eastern terminus of Linwood Boulevard at Van Brunt Boulevard / Emanuel Cleaver II Boulevard.
