= 39th Street (Kansas City) =

Major street in Kansas City, Missouri, United States

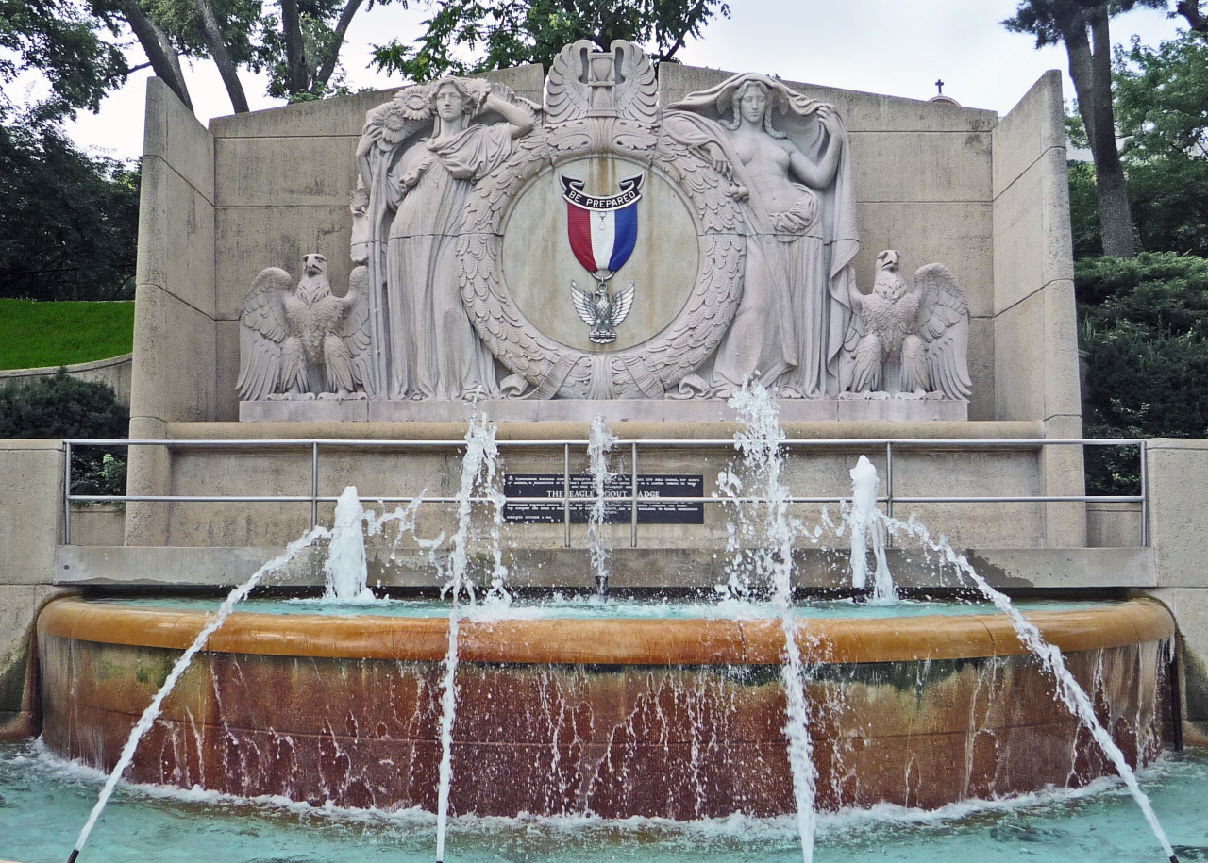
- The Eagle Scout Memorial Fountain at the intersection with Gillham Road, featuring one of the four "Day and Night" statues by Adolph Weinman that once flanked clocks in Penn Station.
- Interactive map of 39th Street
- Length: 4.9 mi (7.9 km)
- Coordinates: 39°3′23.79″N 94°35′10.10″W
- East: State Line Road
- West: Topping Avenue

39th Street is a major east–west street in Kansas City, Missouri, running almost 5 miles from State Line Road at the Kansas-Missouri border to Topping Avenue in Kansas City's East Side. It was originally named Rosedale Avenue as it led to the town of Rosedale. It continues west into Kansas as 39th Avenue through The University of Kansas Hospital's Kansas City, Kansas, campus.

Running through Kansas City's urban core, 39th Street connects many historic neighborhoods including Volker, Roanoke, Westport, Hyde Park, Squier Park, and Ivanhoe. It plays an important role as an east–west artery, providing cross-town traffic with access to most of Kansas City's main north–south thoroughfares: State Line Road, Southwest Trafficway, Broadway Boulevard, Main Street, Gillham Road, Troost Avenue, The Paseo, U.S. Route 71, Prospect Avenue, and Emanuel Cleaver II Boulevard. West of Gillham Road, 39th Street is zoned predominantly commercial or mixed-use space as compared to residential zoning to the east.

== West 39th Street ==
Also referred to as W39thKC, this half-mile corridor from State Line Road to Southwest Trafficway is a commercial connector and community improvement district composed of local shops, restaurants, and other businesses. Popular W39thKC attractions include monthly 3rd Friday events, Roselawn, the Thomas Hart Benton Home & Studio Museum, Roanoke Park, and the Westport-Roanoke Community Center. The district does not include the half-mile stretch of 39th Street between Southwest Trafficway and Main Street also signified as "W 39th St" on street signs.

== Points of interest ==
- The University of Kansas Hospital, located at 3901 Rainbow Boulevard, lies across State Line Road at 39th Street's western terminus.
- The W39thKC district, located along 39th Street from State Line Road to Southwest Trafficway.
- The historic Loretto, located at 1111 W. 39th Street.
- The Westport Middle School and Westport High School buildings, straddling E 39th Street between McGee and Locust Streets.
- The Eagle Scout Memorial Fountain, located at 39th Street and Gillham Road.
