= The Paseo (Kansas City, Missouri) =

Major roadway in Kansas City, Missouri

Coordinates: 39.0478°N 94.5679°W

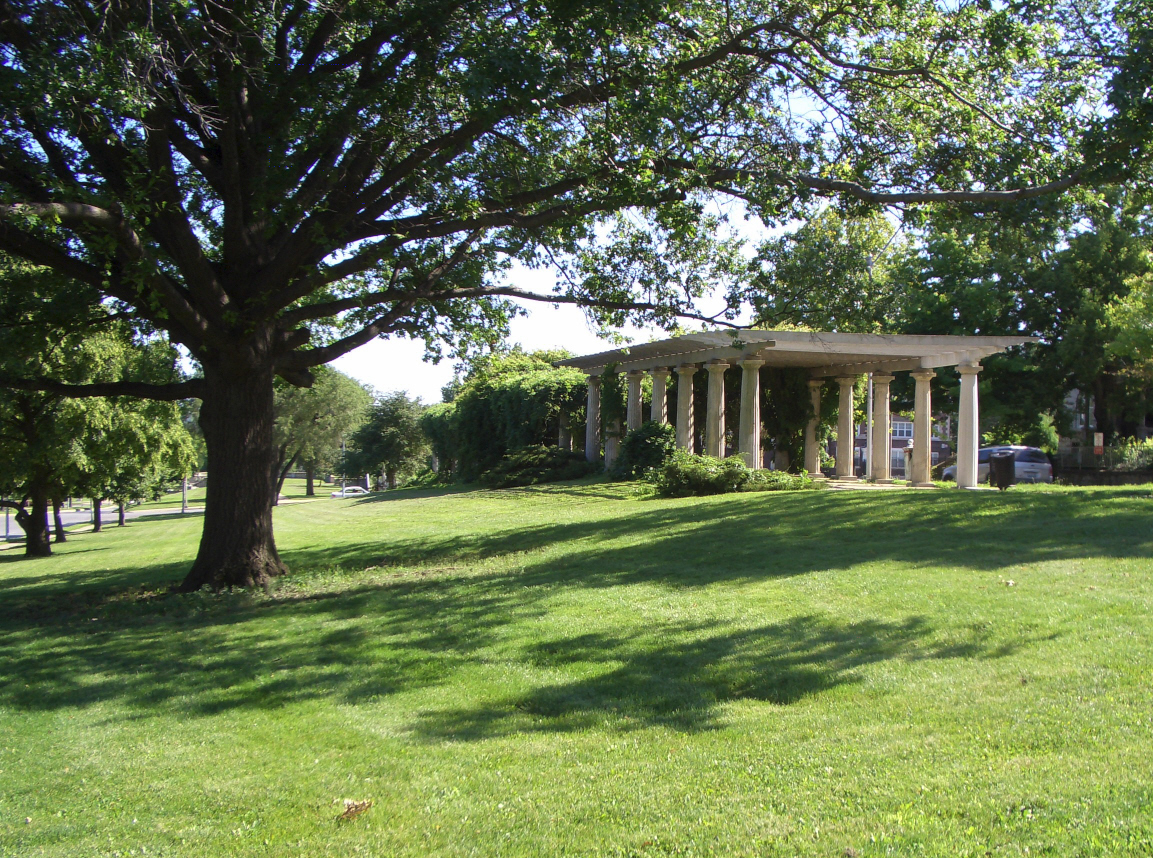
A beaux-arts pergola with Doric columns from 1899 designed by architect John Van Brunt, covered with wisteria vines in the parkway.

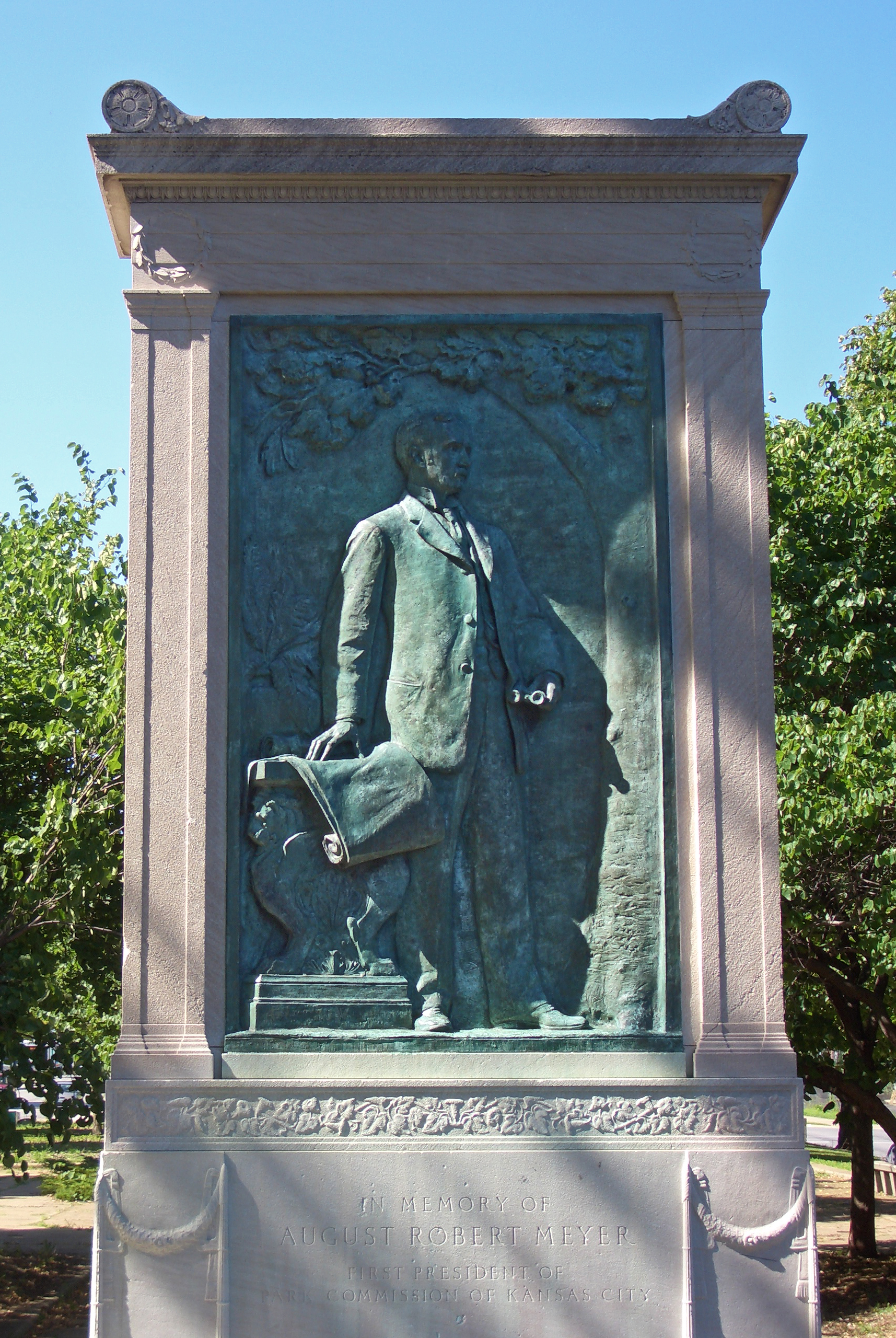
Bas-relief sculpture of August Meyer by Daniel Chester French, American sculptor.

The Paseo (also known as Paseo Boulevard, or Paseo) is a major north–south parkway in Kansas City, Missouri. As the city's first major boulevard, it runs approximately 10 miles (16 km) (85 blocks) through the center of the city: from Cliff Drive and Lexington Avenue on the bluffs above the Missouri River in the Pendleton Heights historic neighborhood, to 85th Street and Woodland Avenue. The parkway holds 223 acres (0.90 km^{2}) of boulevard parkland dotted with several Beaux-Arts-style decorative structures and architectural details maintained by the city's Parks and Recreation department.

The name was suggested by the first president of the Parks Board, August R. Meyer (1851–1905), based on the Paseo de la Reforma in Mexico City. In 2019, the city council renamed the street to Martin Luther King Jr. Blvd and was immediately petitioned to subject the change to a citywide vote, in a strong controversy. A vote to rename the boulevard back to The Paseo passed on November 5, 2019.

== Background ==
Kansas City's extensive parkway and boulevard system was designed as part of the City Beautiful Movement. Its design theme and name are taken from the Paseo de la Reforma in Mexico City. From its start at Cliff Drive, the original alignment was changed to install the on-ramp to Interstate 35, then it curves slightly southwest and heads almost due south for most of its length. A few city parks are located adjacent to The Paseo, such as Parade Park at Truman Road and Troost Park at 31st Street.

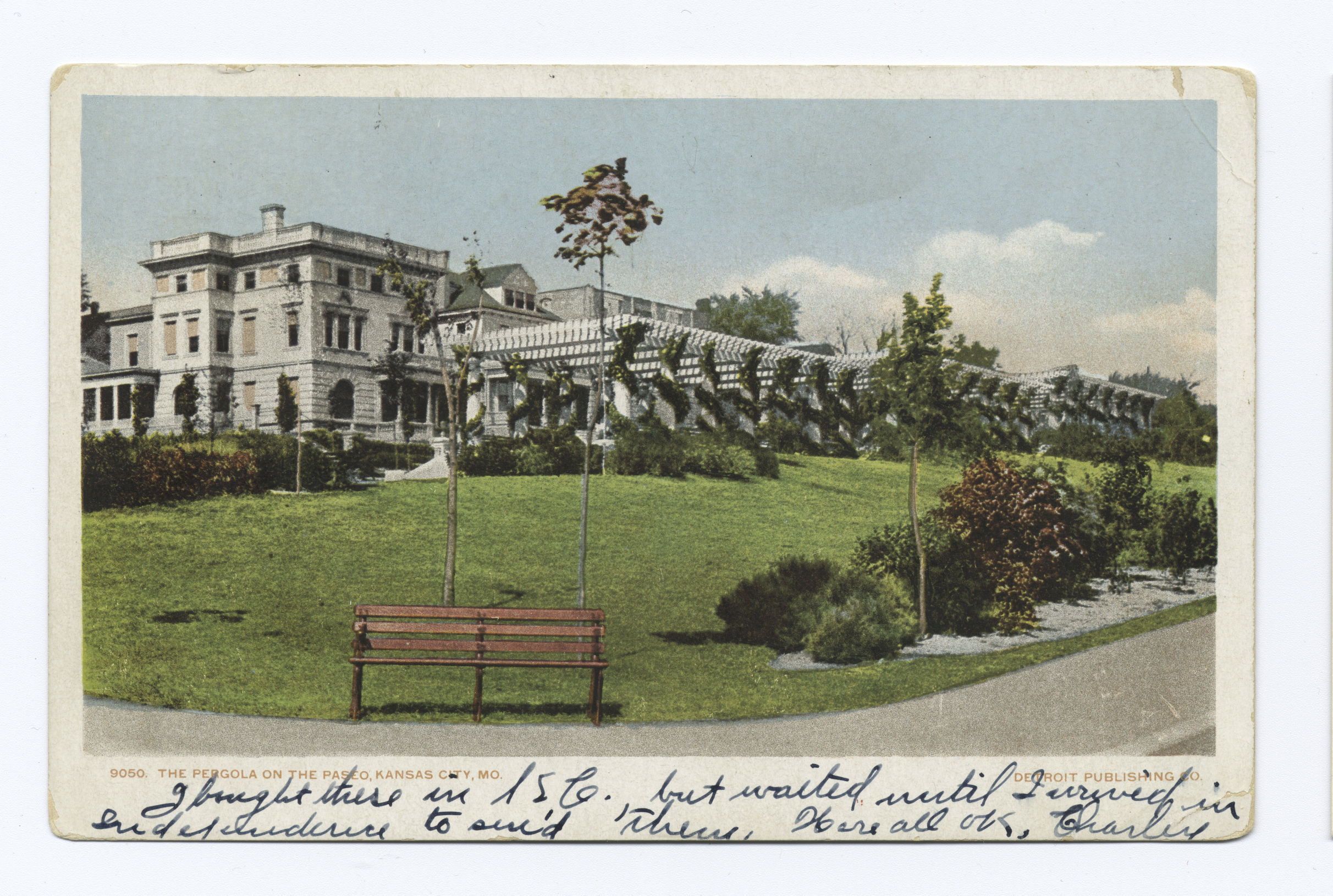
The pergola when new

The parkway was laid out in the early 1900s by George Kessler under the direction of August Meyer, first president of the Commission of Parks. The Paseo, conceived as a series of small parks, extended through a former slum area and contained intersections that featured a formal sunken garden, a pergola, and large fountains reminiscent of those at Versailles. Its construction was preceded by the eviction of African-American families that had to move to other overcrowded slums. Its northern end acquired an unsavory reputation during the early 1920s owing to the spread of prostitution, gambling and narcotics in the area. In the 1920s, with the re-emergence of the African-American population in the surrounding areas, the Paseo stood out as "ribbon of white in an otherwise black village", with more than half the white population living in the area having a Paseo address.

The Paseo intersects with US 71, US 40, I-70, US-Bus 24, and US 56. The Christopher S. Bond Bridge (which replaced the defunct Paseo Bridge in 2010) features direct north–south access onto the road via exit-entrance ramps. Trucks are prohibited from using the Paseo.

== Points of interest ==
- The Housing Authority of Kansas City, Missouri is located at 299 Paseo.
- Kansas City University of Medicine and Biosciences is located at Independence Ave & Paseo.
- A Daniel Chester French sculpture honoring Meyer, dedicated in 1909, stands at 10th & Paseo.
- Dr. Generous Henderson House, designed by Rudolf Markgraf in 1899, is the only remaining example of Second Renaissance Revival style in Kansas City, on the National Register of Historic Places, at 1016 Paseo.
- Parade Park from Truman Road to 18th Street. It is home to the new Kansas City Major League Baseball Urban Youth Academy.
- "Bird Lives," statue honoring Charlie "Bird" Parker, jazz saxophone player, by Robert Graham, at 17th Terrace.
- The 18th and Vine Historic District, on the National Register of Historic Places at 18th & Paseo. Negro Leagues Baseball Museum and American Jazz Museum is at 18th & Vine.
- The Paseo YMCA, plans for the future home of the Buck O'Neil Education Research Center.
- Troost Lake and Park, located at 27th Street.
- Scottish Rite Temple, monumental Beaux-Arts/Egyptian Revival civic auditorium, designed by Keene and Simpson (1930), at Linwood Boulevard.
- Stoplight, unusual signal made of cut-stone in the middle of the intersection designed by Edward Buehler Delk (1931), at Linwood Boulevard.
- Faxon Montessori, located at Linwood Boulevard (32nd Street).
- Keneseth Israel-Beth Shalom Synagogue (now Victorious Life Church), colorful twin mosaic domes on a Byzantine-style building, by Greenbaum, Hardy, and Schumacher (1927), at 34th Street.
- Gates BBQ restaurant on Cleaver II Boulevard at Paseo. The headquarters are located at 4621 Paseo, formerly at Volker Boulevard.
- Brush Creek, from Emanuel Cleaver II Boulevard to Volker Boulevard.
- "PASEO" Rocks and Stairs, At Volker Blvd, leading up to the old Paseo High School, now Paseo Academy.
- Rockhurst University, from Rockhurst Road (52nd Street) to 54th Street.
- The Landing Mall, located at 63rd Street.
- Nazarene Theological Seminary and formerly the location of the Church of the Nazarene World Headquarters, at Meyer Boulevard. The site of the old headquarters is now Ewing Marion Kauffman School.
- Marlborough Community Center is located at 8200 Paseo.
- Route 85-Paseo travels on parts of Paseo between Armour Boulevard (35th Street) and 85th Street. (formerly Route 54-Armour/Paseo)

== Main parts ==
- Christopher S. Bond Bridge, near its starting point.
- Paseo Academy, a magnet performing arts high school formerly known as Paseo High School.
- Route 85-Paseo, a city transportation bus route.
- Paseo YMCA, a historic YMCA that is part of a renovation plan.

== See also ==
- 39th Street (Kansas City)
- Linwood Boulevard (Kansas City)
- Prospect Avenue (Kansas City, Missouri)
- Southwest Boulevard (Kansas City)
