= Squier Park, Kansas City, Missouri =

Coordinates: 39.05958°N 94.56958°W

- Squier Park
- U.S. National Register of Historic Places
- U.S. Historic district
- Intersection of Manheim Road and 39th Street, 1920
- Location: Kansas City, MO
- Architect: Louis S. Curtiss, John McKecknie, Nelle E. Peters, Selby Kerfiss, and Smith, Rea & Lovitt.
- Architectural style: Prairie School, Craftsman, Kansas City Shirtwaist, Folk Victorian, Colonial Revival, Classical Revival, Tudor Revival
- NRHP reference No.: 12000232
- Added to NRHP: April 24, 2012

Squier Park is a historic neighborhood in midtown Kansas City, Missouri, USA. It encompasses sixteen blocks bounded by Armour Boulevard on the north, 39th Street on the south, Troost Avenue on the west, and Paseo Boulevard on the east. It is primarily a residential neighborhood, with businesses along Troost Avenue. It has been listed on the National Register of Historic Places since 2012.

== History ==
The neighborhood was developed between 1887 and 1915 by James J. Squier, and his son-in-law, Robert V. Jones. Because of its development along city transportation lines, Squier Park is considered an early streetcar suburb.

== James Squier, Robert V. Jones and early development ==
James J. Squier was born in Pennsylvania in 1836. He managed a hardware store in Cambridge, Ohio with his father in 1856 before moving to Chicago to open another store. In Chicago Squier began a highly successful career in cattle. In 1872 Squier moved to Kansas City to work as a cattle buyer for the Fowler packing house and eventually amassed a great fortune. Squier, along with several other wealthy Kansas Citians, founded Citizens' National Bank in 1882. In 1889, he founded Interstate National Bank, both primarily cattlemen's banks. Squier was known throughout Kansas City as a banker and capitalist.

Squier took pride in the country estate he built shortly after purchasing land between 36th and 41st Streets, Troost and The Paseo, outfitting it with a suitable residence, formal landscaping, a fishpond and deer park. Squier was aware that the Kansas City limits were moving further south and east, closer to his property. Seeing an opportunity, Squier began to divide his land into lots in the hopes of creating a residential development. But by 1900 only a small number of lots had dwellings constructed upon them, mostly north of what is now 37th Street.

James J. Squier died in 1900, leaving his estate to his wife and only daughter, Cora. Squier's wife, Mary, remained in the manor house, while Cora moved to the East Coast for education and society. There she met Robert Valentine Jones, a successful residential developer, whom she married in 1902 in a ceremony at Squier Manor. The couple lived in Philadelphia before returning to Cora Squier Jones' estate in 1908. Although most of the property had been subdivided 1887, the lots still stood empty. Inspired by the opportunity, Jones formed a real estate and mortgage company, the Manheim Realty & Investment Company, in 1908. Through the company, Jones developed a new plan to subdivide the land between 37th Street and 39th Street.

Jones envisioned a cohesive neighborhood where the street layout responded to the topography of the land rather than the rigid orthogonal city grid. He wanted each house to have a unique design and to stand at the center of a spacious lot. He worked with a variety of prominent Kansas City architects, as well as builders and homeowners to design high-style dwellings throughout the subdivision. As a result, many of the homes south of 37th Street were constructed in 1909 and 1910. Construction continued steadily throughout the 1910s and into the 1920s. Many of the Manheim Realty & Investment Company homes contained such luxuries for the time as hot water heat, sleeping porches, and multiple bathrooms.

By 1920, the neighborhood was filled with architect-designed homes and the curve of Manheim Road created a triangular lot landscaped as a park. Numerous prominent Kansas City architects designed homes in Squier Park, including Louis Curtiss, John McKecknie, Nelle E. Peters, Selby Kerfiss, and Smith, Rea & Lovitt. The wide variety of high-style designs in Squier Park illustrates the wealth of architectural styles popular in the early twentieth century and Jones' requirement that each house have a unique design. The predominantly single-family residential neighborhood contains multiple-family dwellings, educational facilities, and a small-scale commercial building integrated into the development. Because of the neighborhood's development along city streetcar lines, Squier Park is considered an early "streetcar suburb".

In 1925, Robert and Cora Jones divorced, selling the remainder of the property on which the original Squier Manor stood. The new owner demolished the residence that same year in preparation for developing the entire lot as "Squier Manor Community Center" which was to include apartment buildings, a row of businesses, a theater, and a hotel. This development never materialized and the block was subdivided in 1930 for residential development. In 1940, Bishop Lillis High School was constructed on the southeast quarter of the block. Ultimately, Jones' vision of a comprehensive cultural landscape was fully realized by the beginning of World War II.

== Architecture and design ==
Squier Park has a wide variety of building designs reflecting the prolonged development in the neighborhood as well as the evolution of popular architectural styles popular during this period. The neighborhood developed in waves, from the 1880s on the north side of the neighborhood, to 1915 on the south side. Many of the homes on the south end of the area are architect-designed dwellings. In other areas of Squier Park, builders constructed multiple adjacent homes with the same basic design and slight variations.

The most common architectural styles represented in Squier Park are the Prairie School and Craftsman, with numerous examples of the Kansas City Shirtwaist variant. There are also examples of Folk Victorian dwellings as well as historical revival styles, including Colonial Revival, Classical Revival, and Tudor Revival. Other unique dwellings exhibit the Shingle and International Styles.

== Squier Park's heyday ==
The original owners of Squier Park homes were upper-middle class citizens of Kansas City. They were attorneys, successful entrepreneurs, presidents, vice-presidents, and managers of various companies from automobiles and jewelry to lumber and iron. There were numerous high-ranking officials in the railroad industry. Others worked in more creative fields as artists and architects. Two notable residents of the neighborhood at this time were Michael Katz, co-owner of Katz Drug Store, and former baseball player Johnny Kling. Many early neighborhood residents were also members of the Beth Shalom Synagogue, located at 34th and Troost.

== Decline and redevelopment ==
The Great Depression began a period of decline for Squier Park. Many of the large houses in the neighborhood were converted into rooming houses or were simply left vacant. After World War II, flight to the suburbs sent Kansas City's population into a steep decline. The population center of the city moved south and east, away from Squier Park, and Troost Avenue became a dividing line in the city.

Around the same time, several Catholic groups, including the Benadictine Sisters of Mt. St. Scholastica and the Society of Our Lady of the Most Holy Trinity purchased property in Squier Park. The presence of these organizations helped solidify the neighborhood during a time of local urban disinvestment, and continue to be active members of the Squier Park community.

The late 1990s and early 2000s saw a revival of many of Kansas City's midtown neighborhoods, including Squier Park.

== Today ==
The Squier Park neighborhood is guided by the motto: "Pride, Preservation, Participation." Led by the Squier Park Neighborhood Association, the neighborhood hosts a number of events each year, including an Easter Egg Hunt, Fall Festival, and Homes Tour. The SPNA also helps fund improvement projects in the neighborhood, such as planting and landscaping, as well as monthly clean-up days. Its neighborhood meetings are open to all residents.

On April 24, 2012, the Squier Park neighborhood was placed on the National Register of Historic Places. It is only the second residential district east of Troost Avenue to receive the designation.

== See also ==
- Troost Avenue
- Armour Boulevard
