= National Museum of Toys and Miniatures =

Museum in Missouri, United States

- Established: 1982
- Location: 5235 Oak Street, Kansas City, Missouri, United States
- Coordinates: 39.0308°N 94.5822°W
- Website: National Museum of Toys and Miniatures

University of Missouri–Kansas City's The National Museum of Toys and Miniatures, formerly known as the Kansas City Toy and Miniature Museum, is located on the campus of the University of Missouri–Kansas City. (Bequeathed to the university in the 1960s, the home was originally designed for physician Herbert Tureman in 1906 by noted architect John McKecknie and completed by 1911.) Opened in 1982, the museum today has the world's largest collection of fine-scale miniatures and one of the nation's largest collections of antique toys on public display.

With more than 33,000 square feet of exhibit space and a collection of more than 100,000 objects, the Museum currently receives about 30,000 visitors a year. The Museum has undergone two expansions in its more than 30 years of operation.

At its origin, the Museum combined the toy collection of Mary Harris Francis with the fine miniature collection of Barbara Hall Marshall; the two women were avid collectors as well as lifelong friends.
