= Paseo YMCA =

- U.S. National Register of Historic Places
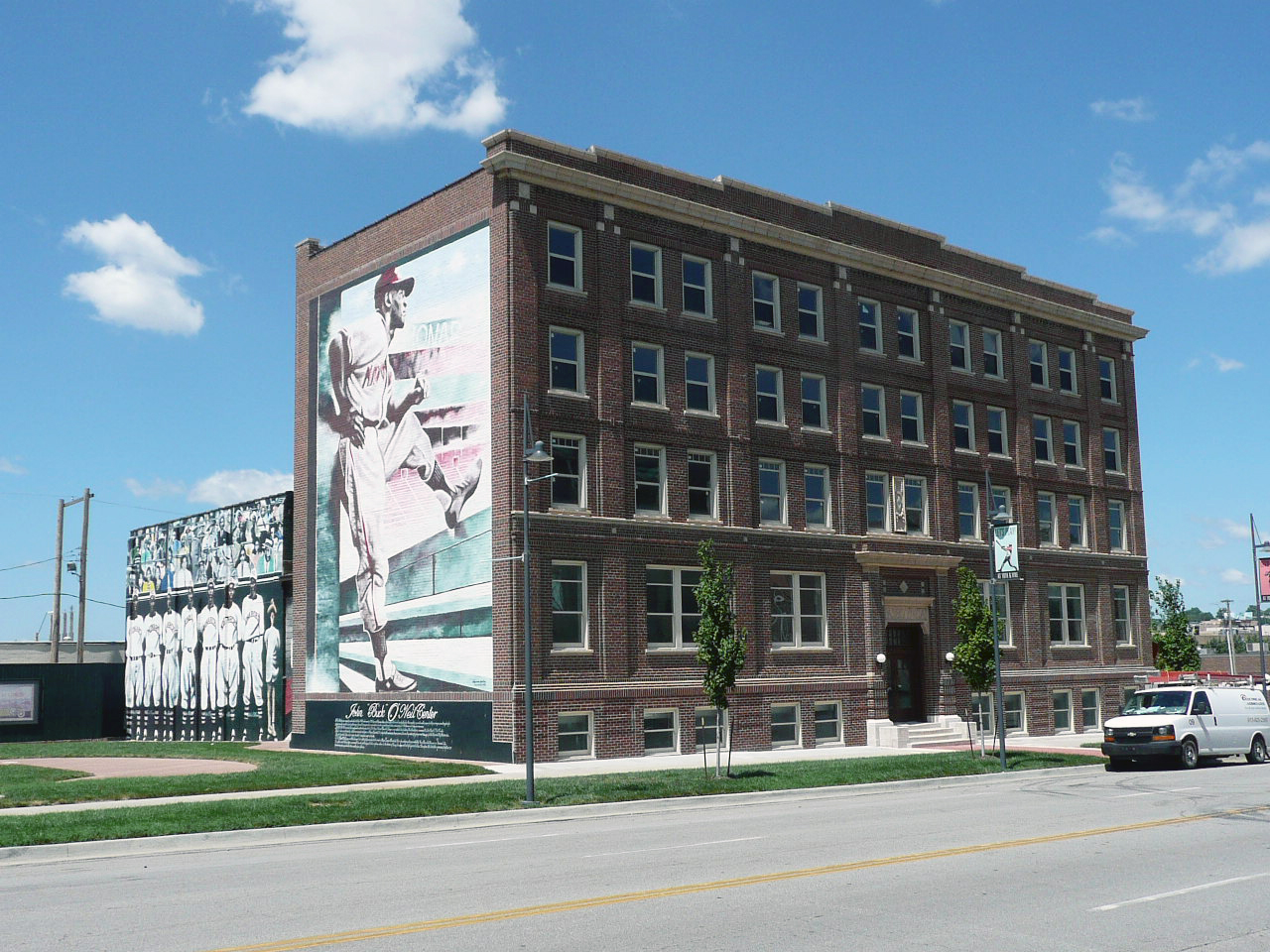

- Location within Missouri Location within the United States
- Location: Kansas City, Missouri
- Coordinates: 39°5′25″N 94°33′53″W
- Built: 1914
- Architect: Charles Ashley Smith
- Architectural style: Colonial Revival
- MPS: 18th and Vine Area of Kansas City MPS
- NRHP reference No.: 91001151
- Added to NRHP: September 9, 1991

The Paseo YMCA is a U.S. historic YMCA in Kansas City, Missouri.

== History ==
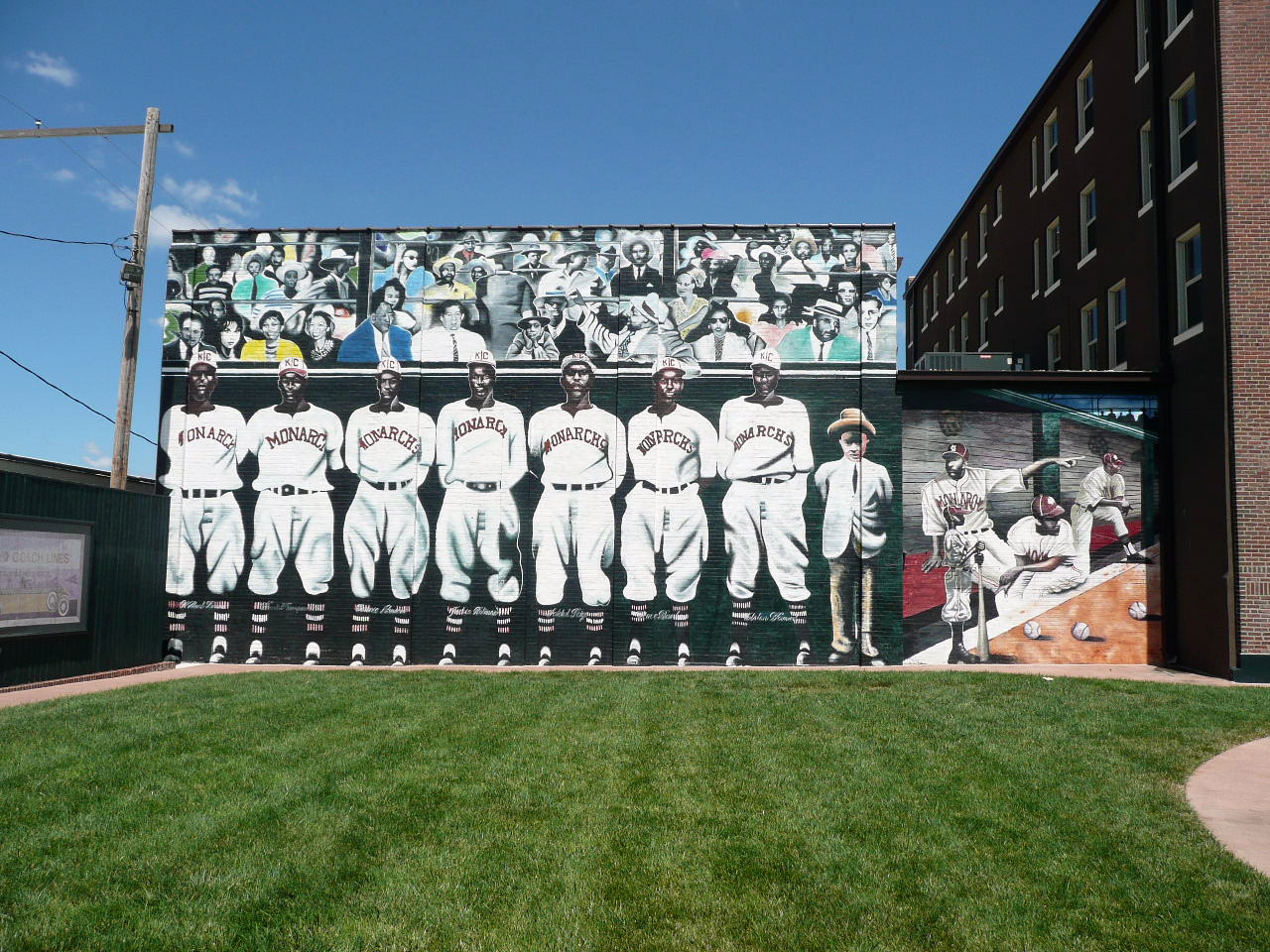
One of the building's murals.

The Paseo YMCA opened in 1914, when Julius Rosenwald encouraged Kansas Citians to raise $80,000 toward building a new YMCA. The architect of the Paseo YMCA was local architect Charles A. Smith.

In 1920 eight independent black baseball team owners met to form what would become the Negro National League.

The facility closed in the 1970s.

== Museum renovations ==
In 2006, the Negro Leagues Baseball Museum spearheaded an effort called "Thanks a Million Buck" to renovate the building and convert it to a research center and museum. The goal to raise a million dollars was quickly reached when John "Buck" O'Neil died in October 2006. The YMCA was slated to re-open as the Buck O'Neil Education Research Center in 2007. However, that plan never came to fruition.

Citing a need for expanded museum space, the organization renewed the proposal to renovate and expand the facility on May 2, 2023, as a part of the "Pitch for the Future" campaign. Organizers now hope for a 2028 opening.
