= Kansas City Southern Railway Building (Kansas City, Missouri) =

- U.S. National Register of Historic Places
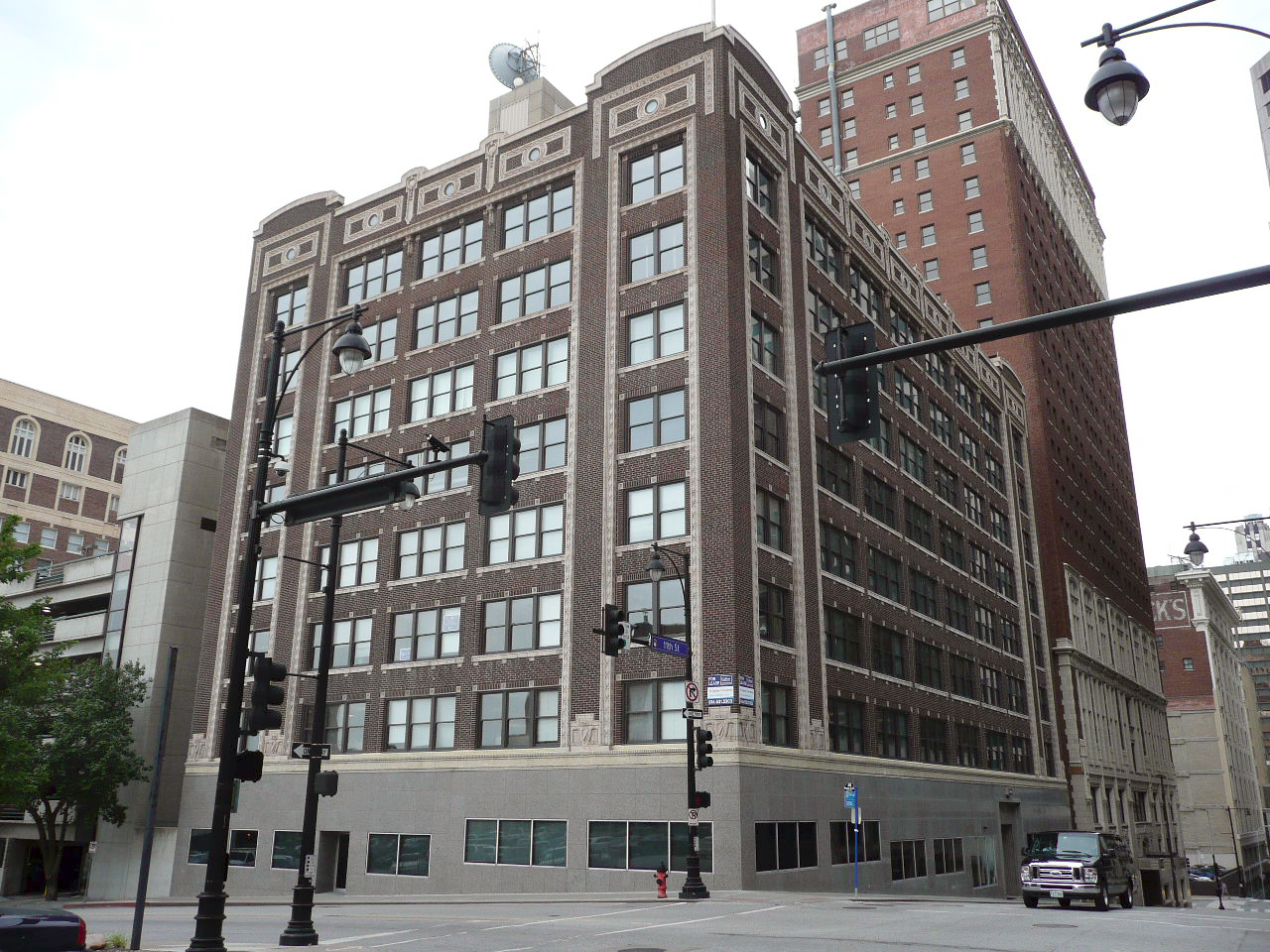

- Location within Missouri Location within the United States
- Location: 114 W. 11th St., Kansas City, Missouri
- Coordinates: 39°6′12″N 94°35′6″W
- Area: less than one acre
- Built: 1914
- Architect: McKecknie, John W.; Carroll, Martin
- Architectural style: Early Commercial
- MPS: Railroad Related Historic Commercial and Industrial Resources in Kansas City, Missouri MPS
- NRHP reference No.: 04000392
- Added to NRHP: May 06, 2004

The Kansas City Southern Railway Building is a historic building in Kansas City, Missouri. It was built in 1914 by local architect John McKecknie. From 1914 to 2002, the building served primarily as the national headquarters of the Kansas City Southern Railway Company, with the exception of several stores on the ground level.

It was listed on the National Register of Historic Places in 2004.
