= Bannister Road =

Major street in Kansas City, Missouri, United States

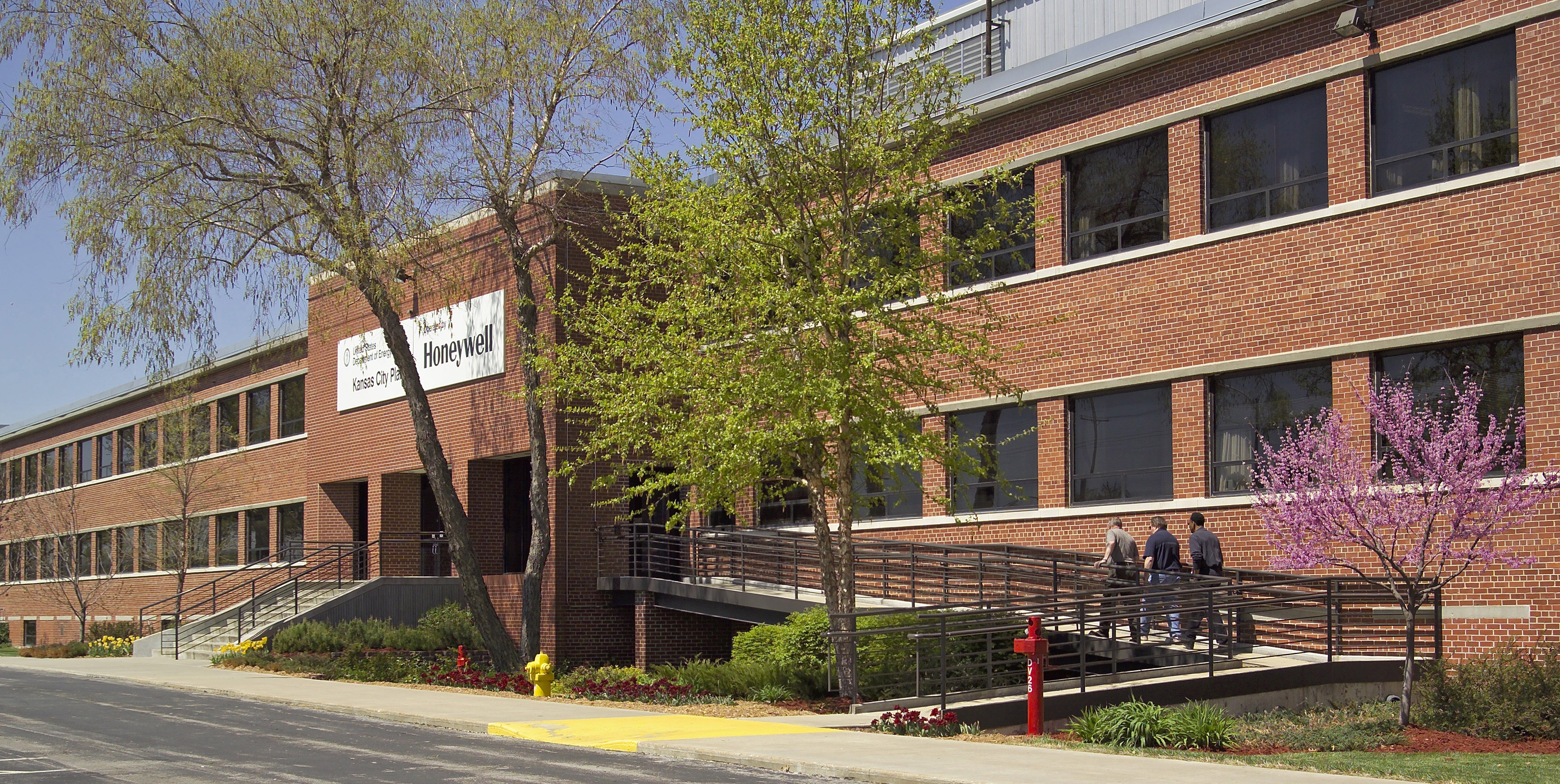
- The Bannister Federal Complex ("KC Plant"), located at Bannister Road and Troost Avenue
- Interactive map of Bannister Road
- Namesake: Frederick James Bannister
- Length: 10.9 mi (17.5 km)
- Coordinates: 38°57′7.06″N 94°29′57.17″W
- East: Route 350
- West: State Line Road

Bannister Road is a major east–west street in Kansas City, Missouri, US, replacing 95th Street. It stretches 10.9 miles (17.5 km) from State Line Road at the Kansas-Missouri state line in the west to Route 350 and Unity Village in the east. It continues west as 95th Street into Kansas, and east as Colbern Road into Unity Village and Lee's Summit.

== Location ==
- Western terminus: State Line Road 38°57′24″N 94°36′29″W
- Eastern terminus: Missouri Route 350 38°56′40″N 94°24′27″W

== History ==
The City of Kansas City, Missouri, and Jackson County began developing a dirt road into Bannister Road in 1917, to be named after local businessman Frederick James Bannister. Born in Watertown, New York, in 1869, Bannister moved to Kansas City as a child in 1877. After establishing himself as a local lumber retailer, Bannister purchased a 280-acre (110 ha) tract of land along present-day Bannister Road in 1910. Here, he built the "La Cima" estate and operated an award-winning milk production facility for six years. Portions of the La Cima ranch were portioned off in 1945 following World War II to house returning soldiers and their families.

Senator Harry S. Truman broke ground on the Bannister Federal Complex, located at the intersection with Troost Avenue, in 1942 following the World War II attack on Pearl Harbor. The site was occupied predominantly by the Department of Energy and the General Services Administration, but also intermittently hosted the Internal Revenue Service, Atomic Energy Commission, National Nuclear Security Administration, National Archives and Records Administration, and government offices in the Department of Defense. Added to the National Register of Historic Places in 2013, the site was decommissioned in 2017.

Bannister Road west of Wornall Road began appearing on maps published by the Missouri State Highway Commission in 1938. By 1940, the Bannister Road-Colbern Road system was appearing as state Supplementary Route 8-S. The growing importance of the Bannister Federal Complex during World War II and standardization of state's supplemental route system led to Route 8-S being renamed Route W within Kansas City, Missouri, city limits: east of Wornall Road to U.S. Route 71 in 1944, and west to State Line Road in 1945. The remaining segment, U.S. Route 71 east to State Route 350, lost supplemental route designation entirely in 1964, though Route W is maintained to the present.

The land surrounding Bannister Road was incorporated into Kansas City, Missouri, in two waves: The western portion, from State Line Road east to U.S. Route 71, was annexed in 1958 followed by the eastern portion, stretching to Route 350, in 1961.

From 1980 to 2007, the Bannister Mall, one of the largest in the Kansas City area at the time, operated on Bannister Road near Interstate 435 (I-435). In 2013, the Cerner Corporation announced plans to redevelop the site as a corporate park.

== Points of interest ==
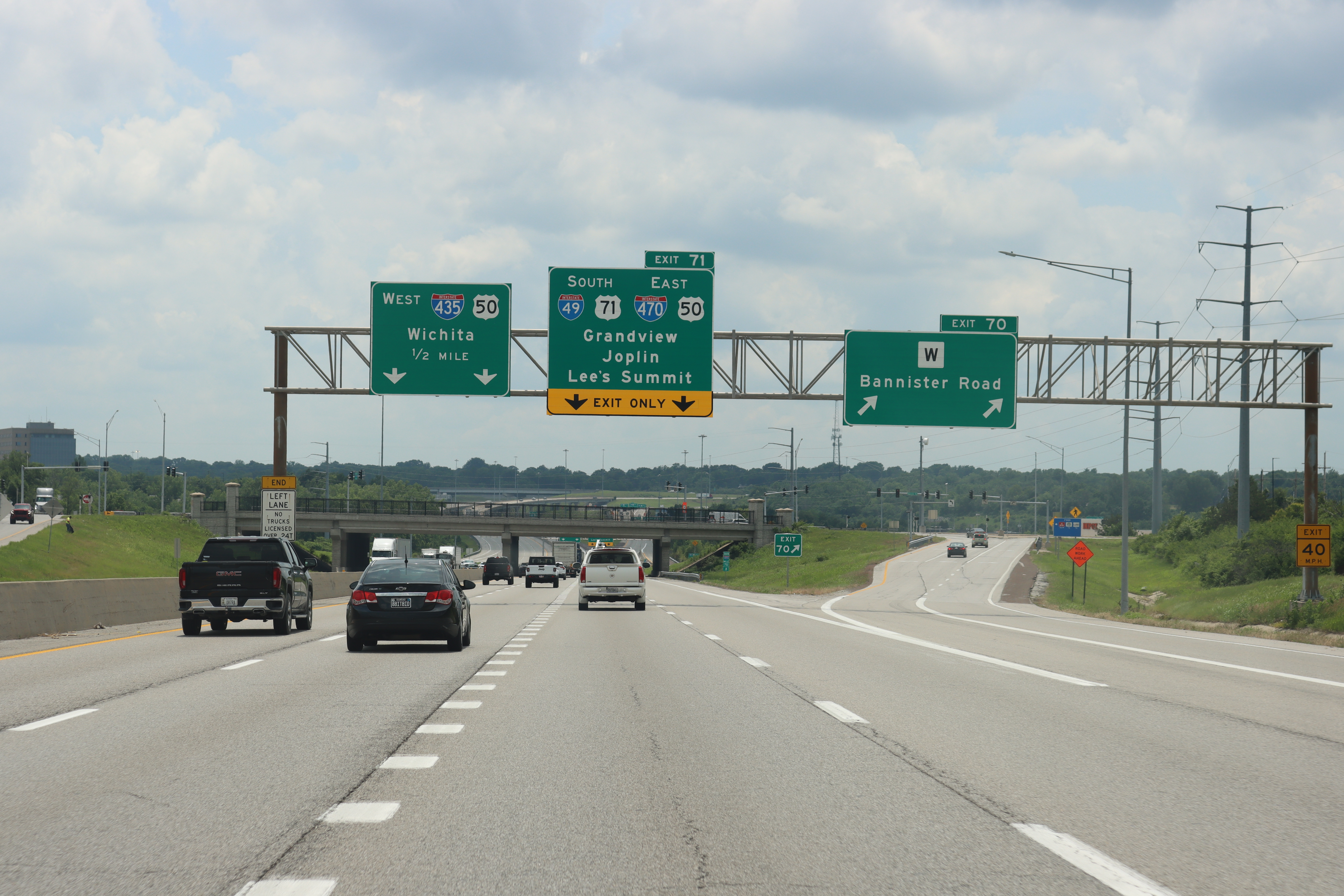
The intersection of Bannister Rd and I-435

- Burns & McDonnell, an architecture and engineering firm, headquartered at 9450 Ward Parkway at the corner of Bannister Road and Wornall Road.
- The former Bannister Federal Complex, located at 1500 E Bannister Road, between Troost Avenue and Blue River Road.
- A trailhead for the Blue River Parkway Trails, offering several miles of greenspace hiking along the Blue River, located at 2701 E Bannister Road, at the corner of Blue River Road.
- U.S. Route 71, passing over Bannister Road approximately 1 mile east of the Blue River.
- The Kansas City Police Department - South Patrol Station, located at 9701 Marion Park Drive, off of Bannister Road between U.S. Route 71 and I-435.
- I-435, located beneath Bannister Road approximately 0.5 miles east of U.S. Route 71.
- Missouri Route 350, located at Bannister Road's eastern terminus.
