= John McKecknie =

American architect

John W. McKecknie (1862–1934) was an American architect working in Kansas City, Missouri, who applied the principles of reinforced concrete in the construction of commercial structures clad in a repertory of classical motifs. He produced designs for some 120 commercial buildings, residences and apartment blocks, establishing the monumental character of West Armour Boulevard with more than a dozen colonnaded apartment blocks. Several of his structures are now registered in the National Register of Historic Places, and others contribute to their Historic District designations.

Born in Clarksville, Ohio, McKechnie studied for two years at Wilmington College, Wilmington, Ohio, (1880–82) before entering Princeton University (AB, 1886), which he followed with two years at the Columbia School of Mines, New York City. He worked in New York for Cady, Berg & See, architects of the original Metropolitan Opera House and the American Museum of Natural History. McKechnie taught evening courses in architecture at the Brooklyn Institute of Arts and Sciences, predecessor of the Brooklyn Museum, and installed full-scale sections of the Parthenon Notre Dame de Paris and other structures at the Metropolitan Museum of Art, New York.

In 1895 he toured Italy, documenting and drawing architecture. The results, supporting Prof. William H. Goodyear's theory that mathematical regularity in ancient buildings was the exception rather than the rule, was published in the Architectural Record, 1896–97.

In 1897/98 McKechnie moved to the booming city of Kansas City, Missouri, to work at first as architect for the builders Hucke & Sexton. By 1900 he had opened his own practice; in 1914 he was joined by his long-term employee Frank Trask as partner.

== Selected works ==
All in Kansas City, Missouri

- Gumbel Building, 801 Walnut Street (1904); one of the earliest examples of reinforced concrete construction in the country, faced with architectural terracotta tiling
- Gloyd Building, 921 Walnut Street (1909); the first reinforced concrete skyscraper in Kansas City and the first clear-span construction skyscraper in the Midwest
- Montgomery Ward and Company General Merchandise Warehouse, 819 East 19th Street (1908, mirror addition constructed 1910); a reinforced concrete structure with traditional façade of red brick and classical details, recognized for its architectural and cultural significance
- Dr. Herbert Tureman residence, 5235 Oak Street (1911); much modified, today it is owned by University of Missouri-Kansas City and houses the National Toy and Miniature Museum
- Grand Avenue Temple and office building, 205 East 9th Street and 903 Grand Avenue (1911); a reinforced concrete and masonry church in Greek Revival style with associated 12-story steel frame neo-classical office building
- Stine and McClure Undertaking Company Building, 924 Oak Street (1912); built with a neo-Egyptian [or Egyptian Revival] exterior, ahead of the Egyptianizing trend of the 1920s
- Kansas City Southern Railway Building, 114 West 11th Street (1914); this headquarters was built to house business operations (ticket sales, accounting, land acquisition, executive offices, etc.) of the rapidly-growing private corporation with a strengthened foundation and walls to accommodate future vertical expansion
- Montgomery Ward Distribution Warehouse, 6200 East Saint John Avenue (1914)
- University Club Building, 918 Baltimore Avenue (1923); the reinforced concrete and masonry neoclassical structure was built from the McKecknie-Trask partnership for a men's social organization, housed the Kansas City Club from 2001 to 2015, and now operates as a special events venue
