= Barry, Missouri =

Former city in Missouri

Coordinates: 39°14′47″N 94°36′03″W

Barry, often referred to as "The Town of Barry" was a city centered at the intersection of Barry Road and Old Stagecoach Road in northern Kansas City, Clay County, Missouri. It was founded in 1829 and named after the Postmaster General William Taylor Barry.

== Geography ==
Barry was located on the border of Gallatin Township in Clay County and Pettis Township in Platte County, northeast of Parkville.

== History ==
Being halfway between the larger towns of Liberty, Missouri and Fort Leavenworth, Kansas, it was an important stop along the newly built Military Road, much of which was later renamed Barry Road. By 1822, it was primarily a trading stop and tavern, owned by George Burnett. His building was on the Missouri side of the border with the adjoining Indian Territory (which became part of Missouri after the Platte Purchase). After Burnett's death in 1838, Judge Thomas Minor Chevis purchased the property in 1839 and expanded the tavern. At the time of the Platte Purchase in 1836, Barry was a fully operating township with a post office, blacksmith shop, stores, saloons, a grist mill, an inn, and several churches. A popular feature of the town was the public well that included a plaque that read, "Drink, for you may never return." In 1843, Peter Hardeman Burnett sold his property and led a 1,000 person wagon train to Oregon, essentially leaving the Town of Barry deserted. As a result, Burnett became the first civilian governor of California in 1849. While all buildings from the Town of Barry have been moved or destroyed over time, the history of the town remains in name: Barry Road, Barry Middle School, Barry-Platte Park, Barry Christian Church, and the neighborhoods, Barry Heights and Barry Harbor.

In the early 1960s, the Burnett-Chevis tavern building was moved to Missouri Town 1855 in Jackson County. The well's outer structure was moved to Clay County's Hodge Park in the 1990s.

Separately, Barry County, Missouri is also named after the same Postmaster General, but is located in southwest Missouri.

In 2018, a historical plaque was placed slightly north of the original center of the town of Barry.
