= Volker Boulevard =

Road in Missouri, U.S.

Volker Boulevard, also known simply as Volker, is a major east-west street in Kansas City, Missouri. It carries U.S. Route 56 and spans from Ward Parkway and Brookside Boulevard near the Country Club Plaza along Brush Creek to Swope Parkway and Paseo Boulevard. The boulevard is named after William Volker.
