= Kansas City Athenaeum =

- U.S. National Register of Historic Places
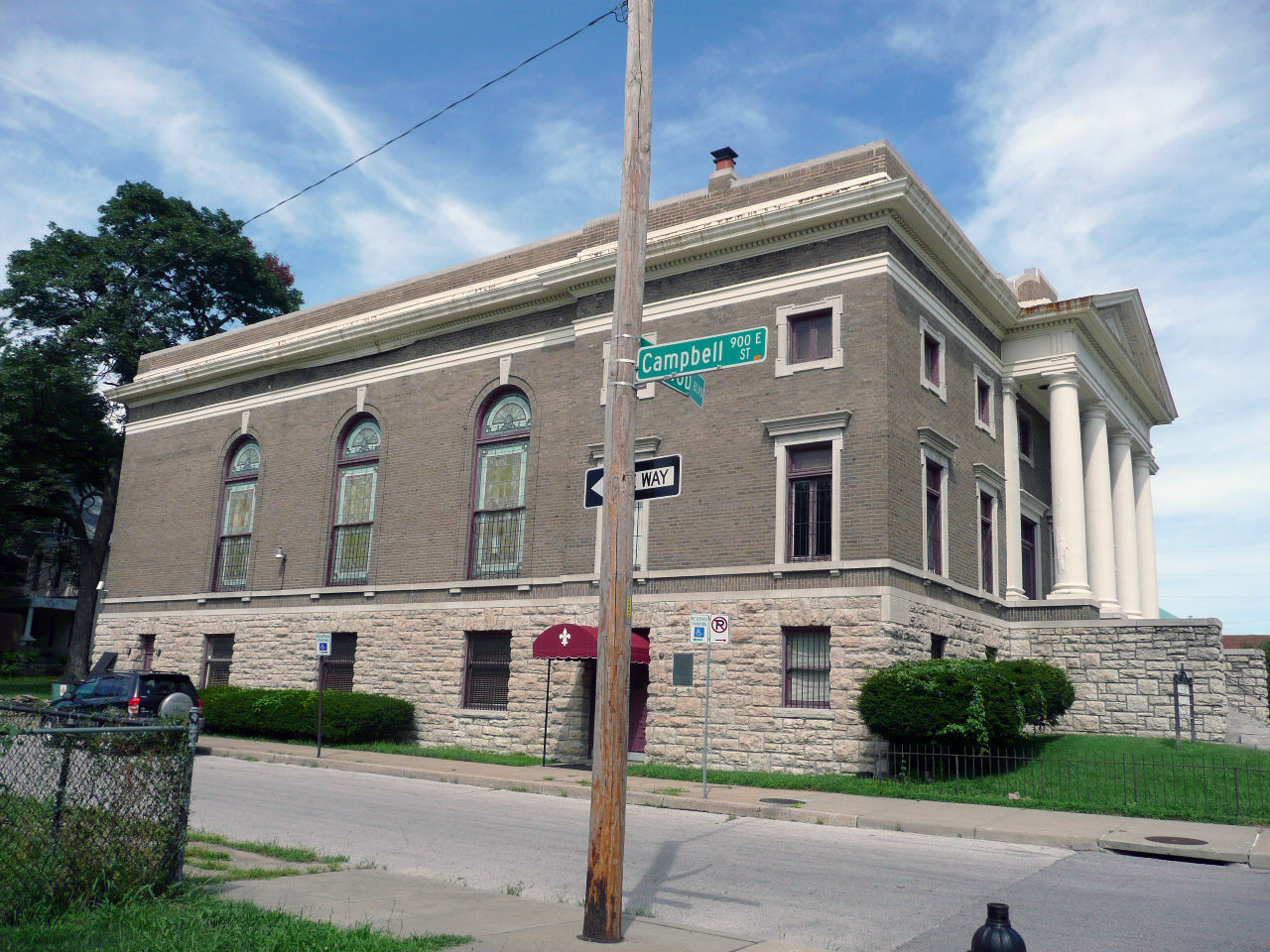

- Location within Missouri Location within the United States
- Location: 900 E. Linwood Blvd., Kansas City, Missouri
- Coordinates: 39°4′9″N 94°34′26″W
- Area: less than one acre
- Built: 1914
- Architect: Tarbet, Samuel
- Architectural style: Classical Revival
- NRHP reference No.: 79001371
- Added to NRHP: October 11, 1979

The Kansas City Athenaeum is a historic building in Kansas City, Missouri constructed in 1914. It was listed on the National Register of Historic Places in 1979.

== History ==
Officially known as the Athenaeum Club House, the building was erected for the Kansas City Athenaeum, a women's organization founded in 1894 and affiliated with the General Federation of Women's Clubs, Inc. since 1898. Athenaeum members faced scrutiny for wanting a building for their own use instead of continuing to rent spaces in Kansas City. The women purchased land at the corner of Linwood Boulevard and Campbell Street in Kansas City, Missouri, because it was accessible by three street car lines.

Kansas City Athenaeum members purchased $5.00 shares in the Athenaeum Club House Company in order to raise the $50,000 to construct the building. At that time in history, American household finances were managed by the husbands. In order to raise money, members sold canned vegetables and needlework. Some members even charged their husbands a nickel to iron their shirts or a quarter if the husband or grown son came home from work for lunch. Additional funds were raised by producing extravagant musical productions, including the operetta, "The House that Jack Built".

Architect Samuel Tarbet and contractor Harvey Stiver were hired, and the members watched their dream come to fruition with the erection of their own club house. They held the grand opening on June 3, 1914. The building included a ballroom on the second floor with six stained glass windows and four meeting rooms. A commercial sized kitchen and dining hall filled the first floor. At the time of the building's opening, the Kansas City Athenaeum had more than 500 members who chose their department of interest: The Arts, Music, Literature, Home Economics, Philosophy and Ethics, and Public Issues.

Members of the Kansas City Athenaeum met continuously in their club house for 101 years. In 2015 the decision was made to sell the building to Delta Sigma Theta sorority. With "ATHENAEUM" permanently etched in the exterior Carthage stone, the new owners chose to identify their building as the Delta Athenaeum. Kansas City Athenaeum members continue to meet semimonthly in different parts of the Kansas City area, devoting their efforts to philanthropy and community service.
