= Northland, Kansas City =

Region in Kansas City

Coordinates: 39.246449°N 94.576039°W

The Northland is an area on the northside of the Kansas City metropolitan area comprising Platte County and Clay County. North of the Missouri River, the Northland includes the northern part of Kansas City, Missouri, the cities of North Kansas City, Liberty, Parkville, Riverside, Platte City, and Gladstone, and the towns of Smithville, Weatherby Lake, and Pleasant Valley. The area is home to more than 360,000 people.

The Northland is largely suburban and rural compared to the rest of the Kansas City metro area, but it has been rapidly developing since the 2010s.

Notable Businesses and Attractions

- Briarcliff Village
- Charles B. Wheeler Downtown Airport
- Kansas City International Airport
- North Kansas City Hospital
- Oceans of Fun
- Shoal Creek Living History Museum
- Weston
- William Jewell College
- Worlds of Fun
- Zona Rosa
