= Gallatin Township, Clay County, Missouri =

Township in Clay County, Missouri, U.S.

Chouteau Township
- Township
- Interactive map of Chouteau Township
- Coordinates: 39°12′47″N 94°30′06″W
- Country: United States
- State: Missouri
- County: Clay

Area
  - Total: 52.85 sq mi (136.9 km^{2})
  - Land: 51.94 sq mi (134.5 km^{2})
  - Water: 0.91 sq mi (2.4 km^{2}) 1.72%
- Elevation: 856 ft (261 m)

Population (2020)
  - Total: 61,255
  - Density: 1,179/sq mi (455/km^{2})
- FIPS code: 29-04713780
- GNIS feature ID: 766504

Chouteau Township is a township in Clay County, Missouri, United States. At the 2020 census, its population was 61,255.

Gallatin Township was established in the early 1820s, taking its name from Albert Gallatin.

== Settlements ==
Harlem was a small settlement on the Kansas River Bend of the Missouri River. The Kansas City, St. Joseph, and Council Bluffs Railroad passed through the town and crossed the river just north of Kansas City, Missouri. Today Harlem is a small industrial neighborhood in the southern portion of the Northland region in Kansas City.

Hicks was a small settlement just northeast of Harlem located where North Kansas City, Missouri is today.
