= Winnetonka, Kansas City =

Neighborhood of Kansas City, Missouri, U.S.

Coordinates: 39.175°N 94.503°W

Winnetonka is a neighborhood of Kansas City, Missouri, United States.

The community's name is partially derived from Winn, the surname of the original owner of the site.

== See also ==
- Winnetonka High School
