= Ivanhoe Masonic Temple =

- U.S. National Register of Historic Places
- Location within Missouri Location within the United States
- Location: 2301 E. Linwood Blvd. and 3201 Park Ave., Kansas City, Missouri
- Coordinates: 39°4′5″N 94°33′22″W
- Area: less than one acre
- Built: 1920
- Architect: Smith, Rea & Lovitt
- Architectural style: Classical Revival
- NRHP reference No.: 85000942
- Added to NRHP: May 02, 1985

The Masonic Temple in Kansas City, Missouri, USA was a Masonic building from 1920. It was listed on the National Register of Historic Places in 1985. This beautiful edifice was the home of Ivanhoe Lodge No. 446. Ivanhoe, still known today as the jewel of the 18th Masonic district of Missouri, resides in the Waldo neighborhood in south Kansas City as of 1980.

The building was in disrepair by 1999, when it was demolished.

Since 1980, Ivanhoe Lodge No. 446 meets at 8640 Holmes Rd which was at one time part of the Ivanhoe county Club. That extended from 85th street to the north and 91st street to the south
