= The Landing (Kansas City) =

Mall in Kansas City, Missouri, USA

Coordinates: 39.011848°N 94.571891°W

The Landing is a small mall in Kansas City, Missouri. It was built in 1960, on 63rd Street and Troost Avenue (it also has frontage on East Meyer Boulevard) and it was originally an open-air shopping center. The architect of the Landing Mall was Edward Tanner, who was also the architect of the old Kansas City Missouri School District Building on 12th and McGee Street in Downtown. The J.C. Nichols company commissioned local artist Jac T Bowen to make a medley of 30 almost life-sized animal sculptures that children could climb on for the mall. During a remodel in 1970, the sculptures were to be transferred to the Kansas City Zoo, but the sculptures never arrived.

It was enclosed in 1970, and was renamed The New Landing Mall. So far, no renovation plans have been made. The Landing was named for the landing place of Noah's Ark. There was previously a menagerie mural and play area within the mall. It is managed by Block & Company, which lists its current capacity at 131,497 square feet, with the surrounding traffic at 54,000 cars a day.

One of the mall's original tenants was Macy's, which became Dillard's in 1988. The centers original anchor was a branch of the original R.H. Macy company. It was last open as Gold's Department Store and currently operates with a barber college on the second floor.

The mall still stands today and is a marker of the history present in the city.
