= Maple Park, Kansas City =

Neighborhood of Kansas City, Missouri, U.S.

Coordinates: 39.190°N 94.499°W

Maple Park is a neighborhood of Kansas City, Missouri, United States.

A post office called Maple Park was established in 1922, and remained in operation until 1935. The neighborhood was named for the maple trees near the original town site.
