= August Meyer =

American mining engineer

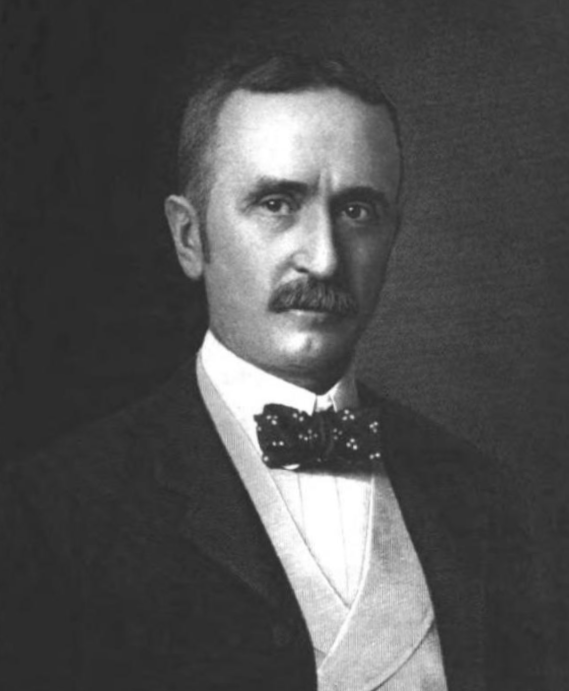
- Born: August Robert Meyer; August 20, 1851; St. Louis, Missouri
- Died: December 1, 1905 (aged 54); Kansas City, Missouri
- Resting place: Elmwood Cemetery
- Education: Freiberg University
- Occupation: Mining engineer
- Spouse: Emma J. Hixon (m. 1878)
- Children: 4

Signature
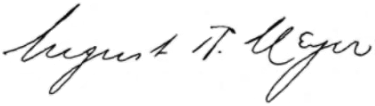

August Robert Meyer (August 20, 1851 – December 1, 1905) was an American mining engineer, founding organizer of Leadville, Colorado, and developed the park and boulevard system for Kansas City, Missouri as first president of the Commission of Parks.

== Background ==
=== Early life ===
August Meyer was born in St. Louis, Missouri, on August 20, 1851. His father was Heinrich Peter Meyer (1815–1864), and his mother was Anna Catharina Margaretha Kraft (1812–1898). They were residents of Hamburg, Germany, and immigrated to the United States before their marriage on July 29, 1844, in St. Louis, Missouri. Heinrich Meyer was an enterprising man: by 1850, the Federal Census shows he was manufacturing lard oil and boneblack. Later, he partnered with Jacob Tamm (1815–1893), founding a company which soon became the St. Louis Woodenware Company, a highly productive and profitable corporation which existed until 1907. (Tamm may have been a long-time friend of Heinrich Meyer; they were both born in Hamburg, Germany, in 1815.) After Heinrich Meyer died, (listed as one of the wealthiest manufacturers in St. Louis at his death,) Anna Meyer sent her son to Europe to begin his education. August Robert Meyer studied at the College of the Canton of Zurich, Switzerland, and after graduating, began a course of study at the School of Mines in Freiberg, Germany, graduating in 1870.

=== Mining career ===
August R. Meyer returned to the United States, and to St. Louis, Missouri, in 1873. He worked for a coal mining operation in Illinois for one year, and then went to Colorado in 1874. In 1875, he started an ore-crushing mill at Alma, Colorado and struck it rich in the Colorado Silver Boom. He and other investors including Horace Austin Warner Tabor founded Leadville and Fairplay, Colorado. His home in Leadville, called Healy House, is on the National Register of Historic Places and is a museum.

He married Emma J. Hixon in 1878, and they had four children.

=== Life in Kansas City ===
In 1881, Meyer moved to Kansas City, Missouri. He established the Kansas City Smelting and Refining Company in the Armourdale section of Kansas City, Kansas. The company was taken over by the Guggenheim-owned American Smelting and Refining Company, and he joined the board of directors. Later, he became president of United Zinc Company.

==== City Beautiful Movement ====
In 1887, Meyer became inspired by the City Beautiful Movement and began pushing for a new park system in Kansas City, Missouri. In 1892, Mayor Benjamin Holmes appointed him president of the city's first park board. Meyer and Holmes hired George Kessler to design the extensive and noteworthy system.

Meyer's home, called "Marburg", was a three-story, 35-room Germanic castle on eight and one-half acres. After his death, Howard Vanderslice bought the house and estate and donated it to become the Kansas City Art Institute (where after a Wight and Wight addition) it is the school's administration building. It is now called Vanderslice Hall and is listed on the National Register of Historic Places.

=== Death ===
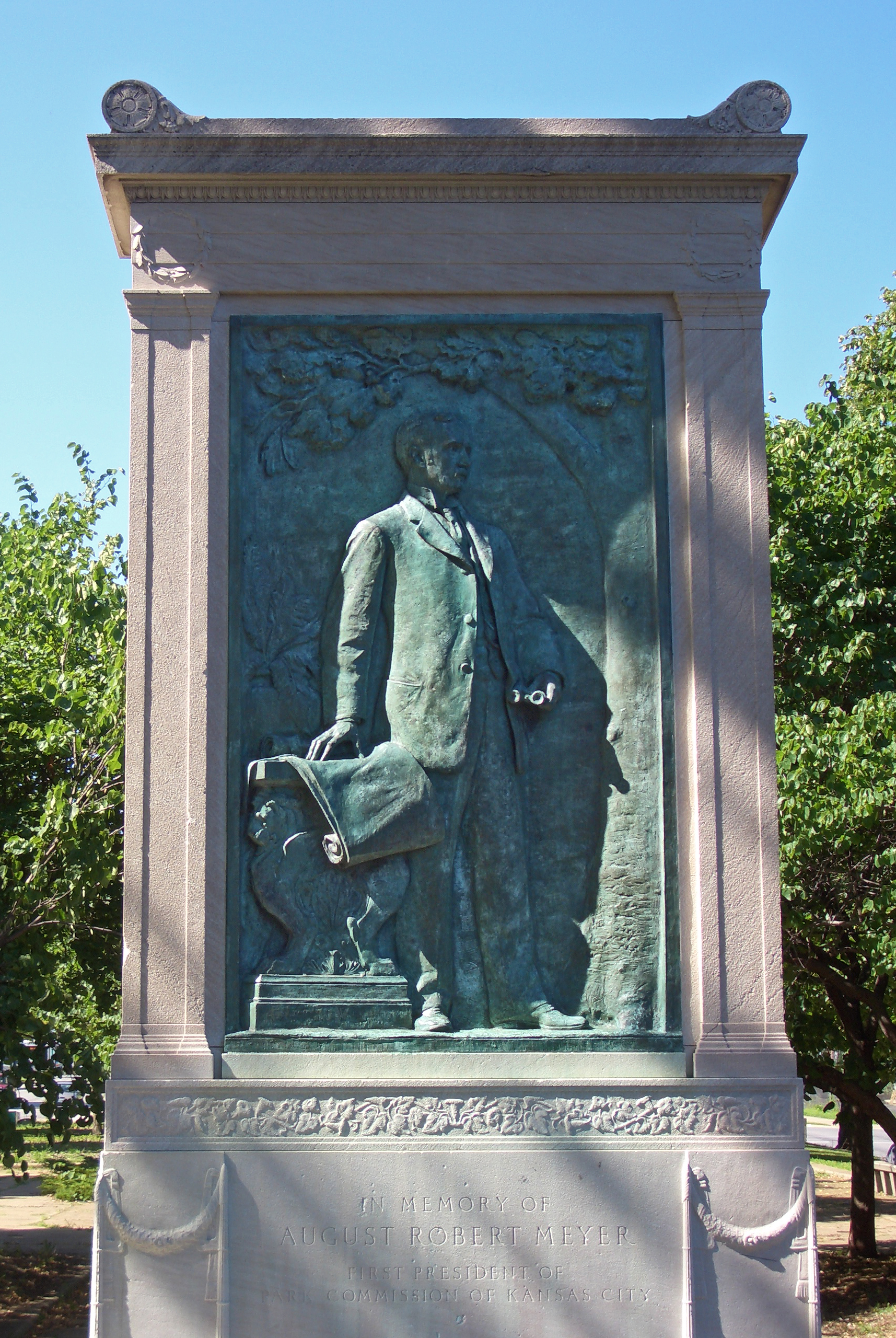
Bas-relief sculpture of August Robert Meyer by Daniel Chester French on The Paseo in Kansas City, Missouri

Meyer died in Kansas City on December 1, 1905, at age 54. He was buried in Elmwood Cemetery.

Meyer Boulevard is named to honor his great work to create the boulevard and park system in Kansas City. A bronze bas-relief sculpture by Daniel Chester French on an 18-foot (5.5 m) high Knoxville marble marker honoring Meyer was dedicated on June 2, 1909, four years after his death. The memorial is located at 10th and The Paseo in the parkway. The epitaph reads:

Houses and Shops Are Man's
But Grass and Trees and Flowers
Are God's Own Handiwork
Undaunted, This Man Planned and Toiled
That Dwellers in This Place
Might Ever Freely Taste the
Sweetest Delights of Nature.
