= Troost Avenue =

Street in Kansas City, Missouri, US

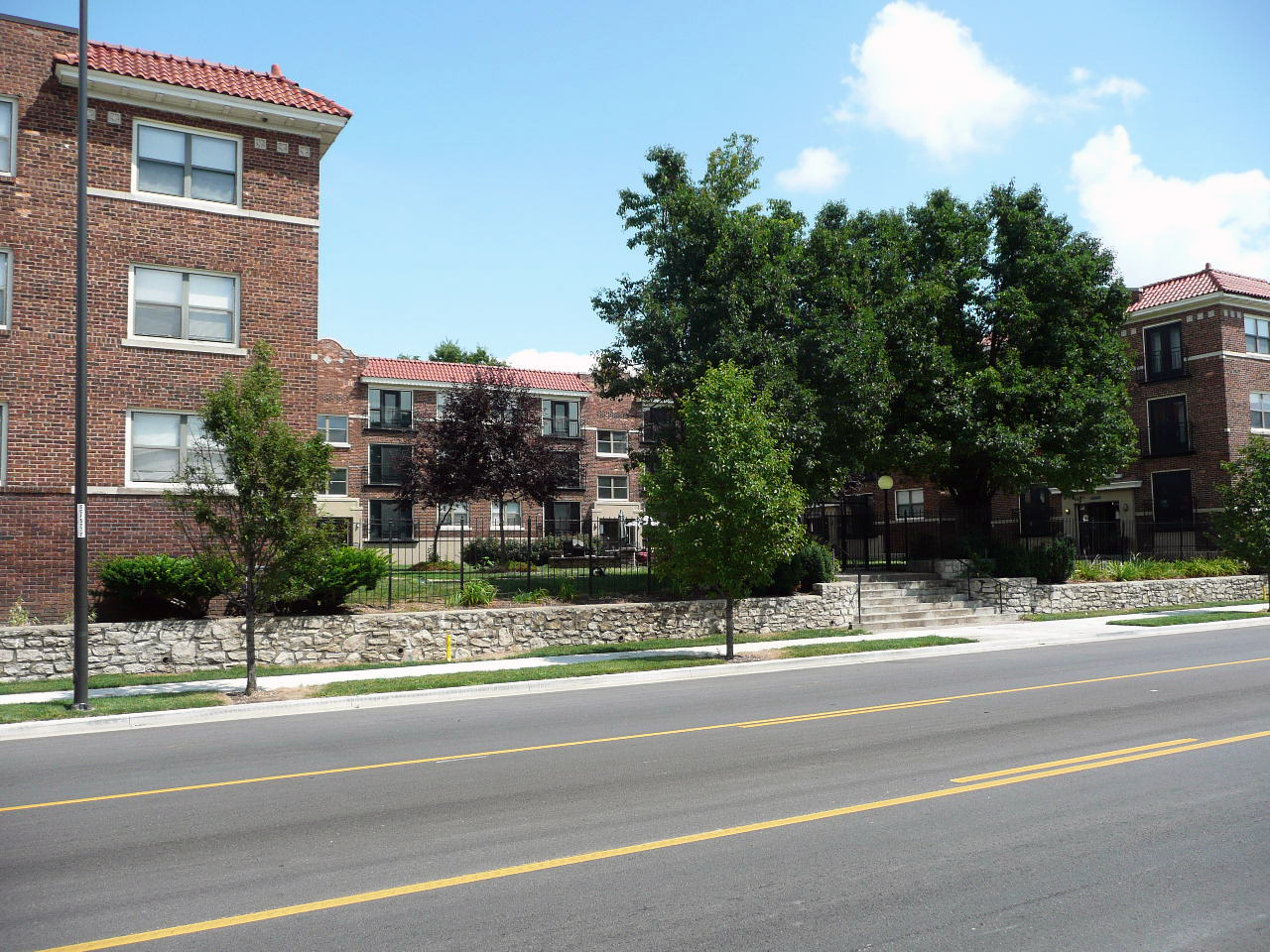
- Troost Avenue in 2015

- Location within Missouri
- Namesake: Benoist Troost
- Maintained by: City of Kansas City
- Length: 10.7 mi (17.2 km)
- Location: Kansas City, Missouri
- Coordinates: 39°4′7.3″N 94°34′17.2″W
- North end: 4th Street
- Major junctions: Linwood Boulevard; Brush Creek / Volker Boulevard; Meyer Boulevard (65th Street)
- South end: Bannister Road

Other
- Known for: Racist dividing line

Troost Avenue is one of the major streets in Kansas City, Missouri and the Kansas City metropolitan area. Its northern terminus is at 4th Street and its southern terminus Bannister Road, totaling 10.7 miles (17.2 km). It is named after Kansas City's first resident physician, Benoist Troost.

== History ==
Troost Avenue was continuously developed from 1834 into the 1990s. From the 1880s to 1920s, many prominent white Kansas Citians (including ophthalmologist Flavel Tiffany, Governor Thomas Crittenden, banker William T. Kemper, and MEC, S pastor James Porter) resided in mansions along what had been a farm-to-market road. The section from 26th to 32nd was nicknamed "Millionaire Row". Zoning ordinances and redline policies introduced by Kansas City in the 1920s, and the implementation of a Troost Avenue streetcar, replaced affluent homes with commercial districts and smaller, minority-owned homes. In the second half of the 20th century, this busy commercial hub became the "Troost Wall" due to a lack of city funding and further decline into blight.

Troost Avenue has historically served as a dividing line of racist segregation and disinvestment in Kansas City, with more white residents living west of Troost and more black residents living to the east. For decades, this line was legally drawn and enforced under Jim Crow laws templated after the neighborhood system of house deed covenants blocking homeownership or occupancy by Black people and Jewish people written by Kansas City real estate developer J.C. Nichols.

Beginning in the 1930s, the portion of Troost Avenue from Meyer Boulevard (65th Street) to 77th Street was concurrent with U.S. Route 71. In 1944, state supplementary Route Y was introduced concurrent with Troost Avenue south of 77th Street to rendezvous with Route W at Bannister Road. As part of Route 71's 50-year transition to the South Midtown Freeway, Route Y was abolished in 1967 and Route 71 was moved from Troost Avenue to Prospect Avenue in 1968.

In the 21st century, the Troost Corridor has been revitalized by zoning overlays, modern streetscape guidelines, and real estate development, often championed by grassroots organizations. A September 2020, resolution by the City Council charged the Board of Parks and Recreation Commissioners with removing city-owned ties to racism and slavery. Local leaders identified Benoist Troost as a key slave-owning historical figure and, in 2022, proposed the Neighborhood Planning and Development Committee rename Troost Avenue to Truth Avenue. A non-binding 2023 poll indicated that the initiative had garnered 55% public support.

== Dividing line ==
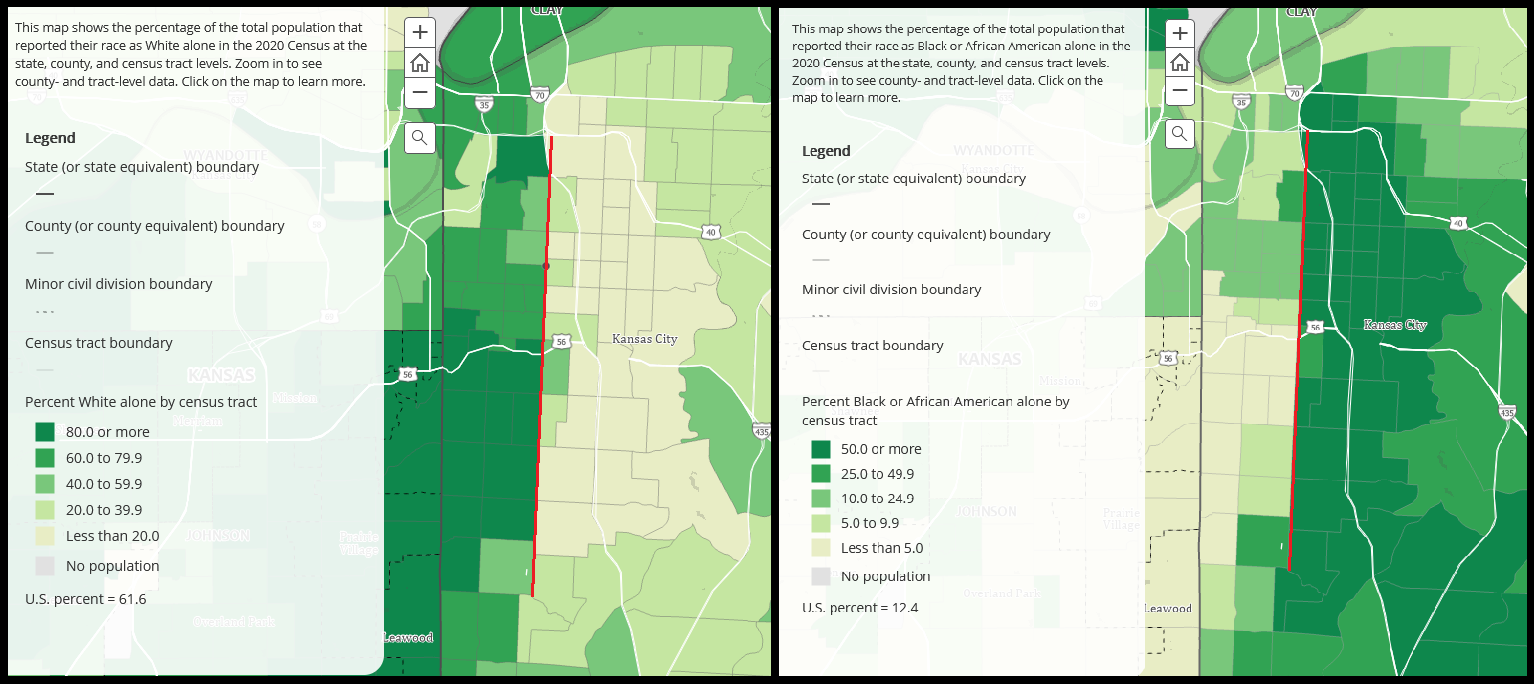
U.S. Census Bureau data shows that 20th century redlining policies have led to Troost Avenue, shown here in red, remaining a racial and cultural dividing line in Kansas City.

Though bordering some of the most historic neighborhoods (including Beacon Hill, Longfellow, Hyde Park, Squier Park, Rockhill, and others), Troost Avenue is one of the most stark physical and symbolic geographical dividers in America. The book A City Divided says that in the 1920s there was a widespread concern among many white property owners about property values. African Americans were to stay on the east side of Troost to prevent "tainting" the neighborhoods and shopping centers that J.C. Nichols developed. This dividing line remained ingrained in Kansas City's structure for decades, as a 2018 article in The Kansas City Star reported that neighborhoods west of Troost are white and neighborhoods east of Troost are black. That year, Kansas City mayor Sly James likened Troost Avenue to "the demarcation line in a war zone". The book Some of My Best Friends are Black argues that Nichols orchestrated white flight from the east side into his west side developments by inducing panic selling and blockbusting.

== Points of interest ==
- Manual Career & Technical Center is located near Truman Road and Troost.
- Kansas City Area Transportation Authority (RideKC) is located near 18th and Troost.
- Kansas City Public Schools Board of Education is located at 2901 Troost.
- Kansas City Police Department - Central Patrol is located near Linwood Boulevard.
- Brush Creek is located at Volker Boulevard and Troost.
- Stowers Institute for Medical Research is located at 50th and Troost.
- University of Missouri–Kansas City is located between 50th and 55th Streets along Troost.
- Rockhurst University is located between 52nd and 55th Streets along Troost.
- The Landing Mall is located at 63rd and Troost.
- Route 25 - Troost is a city transportation bus route.
- Troost Avenue MAX Line is a bus rapid transit route.
