= Thomas Hart Benton Home and Studio State Historic Site =

Historic home in Kansas City, Missouri

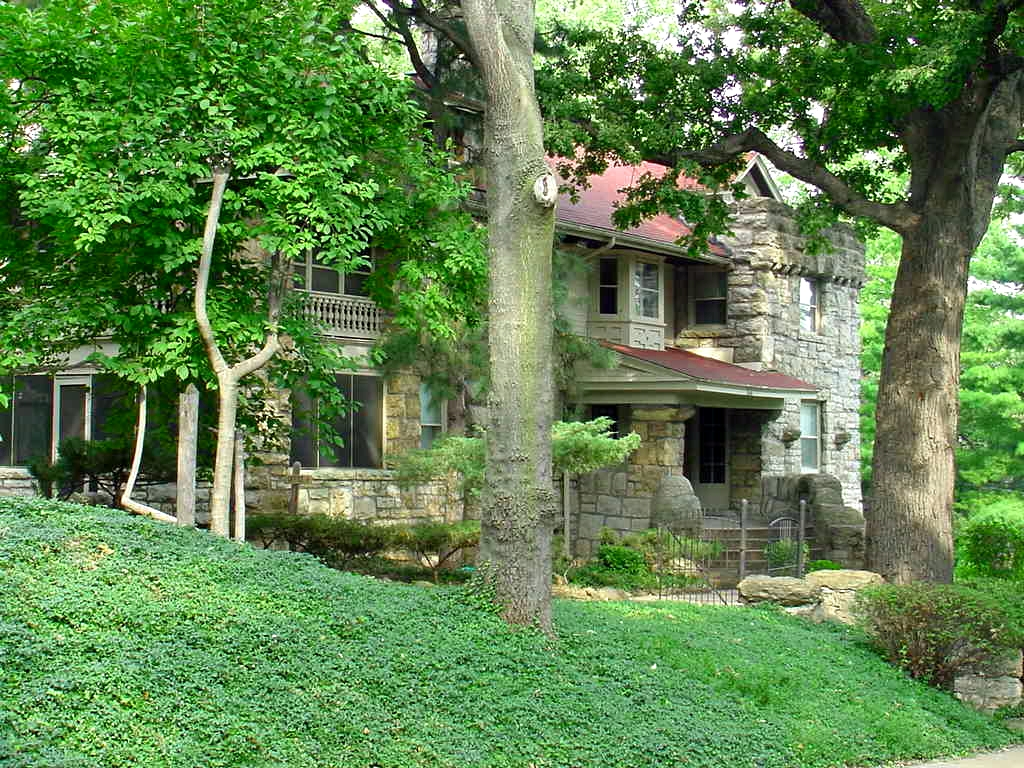

- Location within Missouri Location within the United States
- Location: Kansas City, Jackson County, Missouri, United States
- Coordinates: 39°03′44″N 94°35′52″W
- Area: 0.32 acres (0.13 ha)
- Elevation: 955 ft (291 m)
- Established: 1977
- Operator: Missouri Department of Natural Resources
- Website: Thomas Hart Benton Home and Studio State Historic Site
- Thomas Hart Benton Home and Studio
- U.S. National Register of Historic Places
- Built: Ca. 1903
- Architect: George A. Mathews
- Architectural style: Late Victorian
- NRHP reference No.: 80002362
- Added to NRHP: November 21, 1980

The Thomas Hart Benton Home and Studio State Historic Site is a state-owned property located at 3616 Belleview, Kansas City, Missouri, that preserves the house and studio of Missouri artist Thomas Hart Benton. The historic site was established in 1977 and is managed by the Missouri Department of Natural Resources. Tours are provided that show the furnished house and studio as Benton left it when he died on January 19, 1975. The site was listed on the National Register of Historic Places in 1980.

== History ==
The property was built in Kansas City's Roanoke Park neighborhood around 1903. Although not overly large, the house has a fortress-like appearance owing to its elevation above street level and the random ashlar masonry of its limestone front.

The house was built for Walter E. Kirkpatrick. The architect was George Mathews, a proponent of the City Beautiful movement. Kirkpatrick was the secretary and treasurer for the Kansas City Electric Light Company, and on the board of directors of the KC Street Railway Company. The home is approximately 7800 square feet on 3 1/2 floors, containing 24 rooms, 4 fireplaces on 3 chimneys, and a full finished basement. The Benton family purchased the 1/3-acre property in 1939 for $6000.
