= Armour Boulevard =

Coordinates: 39°03′50″N 94°35′08″W

Armour Boulevard, Armour, or 35th Street is a major west–east main street that runs in Kansas City, Missouri, USA, from Broadway Boulevard to The Paseo. It is named in honor of Simeon B. Armour of Armour and Company.

== History ==
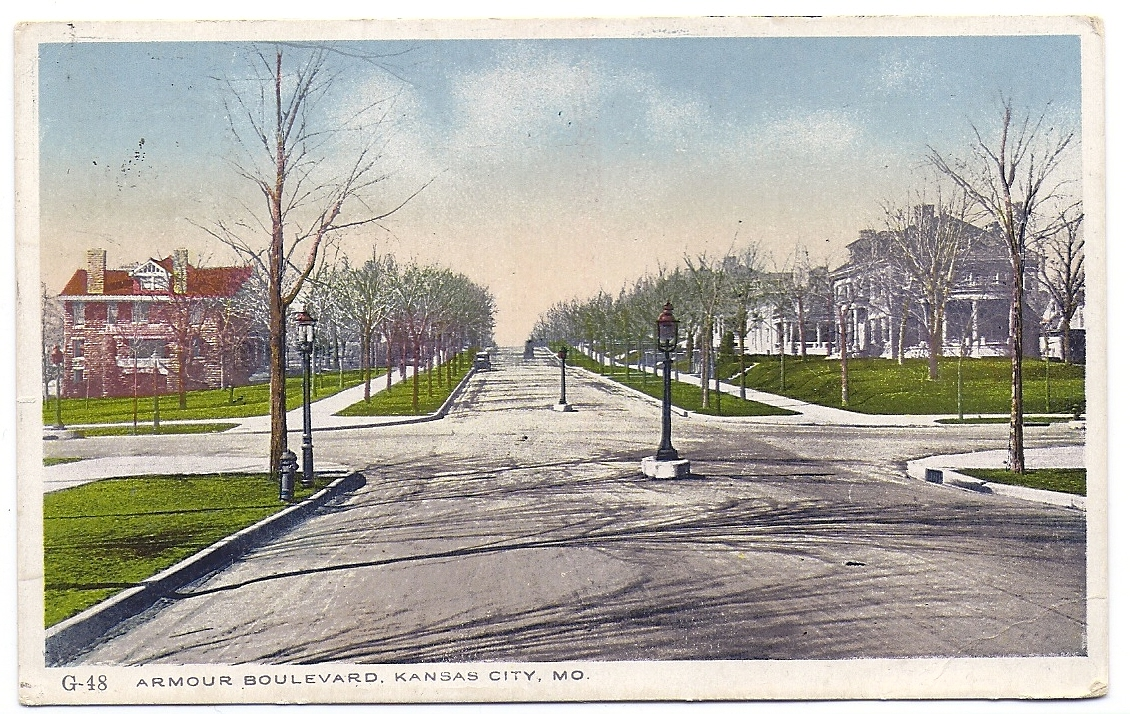
Postcard of Armour Boulevard

In 1896 plans were presented to the Board of Parks Commissioners for a boulevard along Thirty-fifth Street, from Holmes Street to Lydia Avenue (now The Paseo). The park board acquired the land in 1899. In 1900 the park board named the new boulevard for Simeon Brooks Armour (1828-1899), a member of the first official park board and the head of the Kansas City branch of the Armour Meat Packing Industry. Landscape architect George Kessler designed Armour Boulevard according to the standard 100-foot right-of-way proposed in the first Board of Park Commissioners report of 1893. Grading and paving occurred during 1900–01. In 1928 Armour Boulevard was widened and the curbside row of trees was removed; during the next year the roadway was repaved with asphaltic concrete.

Simeon Armour was a powerful supporter of Kansas City's new Parks and Boulevard System and he held a position on the Park Board from 1892 until his death in 1899.

The monumental character of West Armour Boulevard was established by thirteen colonnaded apartment blocks designed by John McKecknie.
