= Gillham Road =

Road in Missouri, U.S.

Gillham Road is a major north–south main street that runs in Kansas City, Missouri from the intersection of 22nd Street at Oak Street to Harrison Road between 45th and 46th Streets. Gillham Road becomes Gillham Plaza from 31st Street to 34th Street. This causes Gillham Road to go over one block east into a residential neighborhood.

Gillham Road serves as the a boundary for many historic neighborhoods, including Longfellow, Union Hill, and Hyde Park. South of 41st Street, Gillham Road also diverges, with Gillham Road West providing access to the Nelson-Atkins Museum of Art and the Rockhill neighborhood.

== Location ==
- Southern terminus: Harrison St. 39°02′40″N 94°34′26″W
- Northern terminus: East 22nd St. 39°05′11″N 94°34′44″W
