= Emanuel Cleaver II Boulevard =

Major street in Kansas City

Emanuel Cleaver II Boulevard, Cleaver 2, or 47th Street, and Brush Creek Boulevard is a major west/east main street that runs in Kansas City, Missouri from J.C. Nichols Parkway to 31st Street. It travels close to Brush Creek.

The street is named after Emanuel Cleaver. Because several streets were renamed in honor of the former mayor, there is considerable confusion concerning addresses and location along Emanuel Cleaver II Boulevard. Brush Creek Boulevard formerly ran from Main Street to Elmwood Avenue, at which point it became Van Brunt Boulevard. This is the current route of Cleaver II Blvd, which continues north onto the former southern end of Van Brunt Boulevard. However, in order to preserve the name of the historic Brush Creek Boulevard, a three block length of 46th Street, from Gilham Road to The Paseo, was renamed Brush Creek Boulevard. Because of this, addresses in old directories and maps are not congruent with the current ones. An example is the Spirit of Freedom Fountain, currently given by the City of Kansas City, Missouri as at Cleveland Avenue and Brush Creek Boulevard. The new Brush Creek Boulevard does not extend to Cleveland Avenue. The name Brush Creek Boulevard is still used colloquially to refer to Emanuel Cleaver II Boulevard by long-term and older residents.
