= Brush Creek =

Brush Creek may refer to the following places in the United States:

== California ==
- Brush Creek (Sonoma County, California)

== Colorado ==
- Brush Creek, Colorado, an unincorporated community in northern Custer County, Colorado and its namesake river, a tributary of Texas Creek

== Iowa ==
- Brush Creek (White Breast Creek), a stream in the Des Moines River catchment

== Minnesota ==
- Brush Creek Township, Faribault County, Minnesota
- Brush Creek, Minnesota, an unincorporated community

== Missouri ==
- Brush Creek, Missouri, an unincorporated community
- Brush Creek (Blue River tributary)
- Brush Creek (Bourbeuse River tributary)
- Brush Creek (Bryant Creek tributary)
- Brush Creek (Fox River tributary)
- Brush Creek (Gasconade River tributary)
- Brush Creek (Lamine River tributary)
- Brush Creek (Missouri River tributary)
- Brush Creek (Osage Fork Gasconade River tributary)
- Brush Creek (Sac River tributary)
- Brush Creek (South Moreau Creek tributary)
- Brush Creek (Thompson River tributary)

== Montana ==
- Brush Creek (Montana), a stream in Flathead County

== Nebraska ==
- Brush Creek (Niobrara River tributary), a stream in Holt County, Nebraska

== North Carolina ==
- Brush Creek (Reedy Fork tributary), a stream in Guilford County
- Brush Creek (Deep River tributary), a stream in Randolph and Chatham Counties

== Ohio ==
- Brush Creek Township, Ohio (disambiguation), four different townships
- Ohio Brush Creek

== Oklahoma ==
- Brush Creek, Oklahoma, a census-designated place

== Oregon ==
- Brush Creek (Curry County, Oregon)

== Pennsylvania ==
- Brush Creek (Connoquenessing Creek tributary)
- Brush Creek (Raystown Branch Juniata River tributary)
- Brush Creek (Shaffer Creek tributary)
- Brush Creek (Wills Creek tributary)
- Brush Creek Township, Fulton County, Pennsylvania

== Tennessee ==
- Brush Creek, Sequatchie County, Tennessee
- Brush Creek, Smith County, Tennessee
- Brush Creek, Williamson County, Tennessee

== Utah ==
- Brush Creek (Utah), a tributary of the Green River

== Virginia ==
- Brush Creek (Banister River tributary), a stream in Halifax County, Virginia

== West Virginia ==
- Brush Creek, West Virginia, an unincorporated community in Boone County
- Brush Creek (Boone County), a stream
- Brush Creek (Cabell County), a stream
- Brush Creek (Kanawha County), a stream
- Brush Creek (Mercer County), a tributary of the Bluestone National Scenic River
- Brush Creek (Monroe County), a stream
- Brush Creek (Wayne County), a stream

== Wyoming ==
- Brush Creek (Medicine Bow National Forest), site of Brush Creek Work Center
