= Architecture of Kansas City =

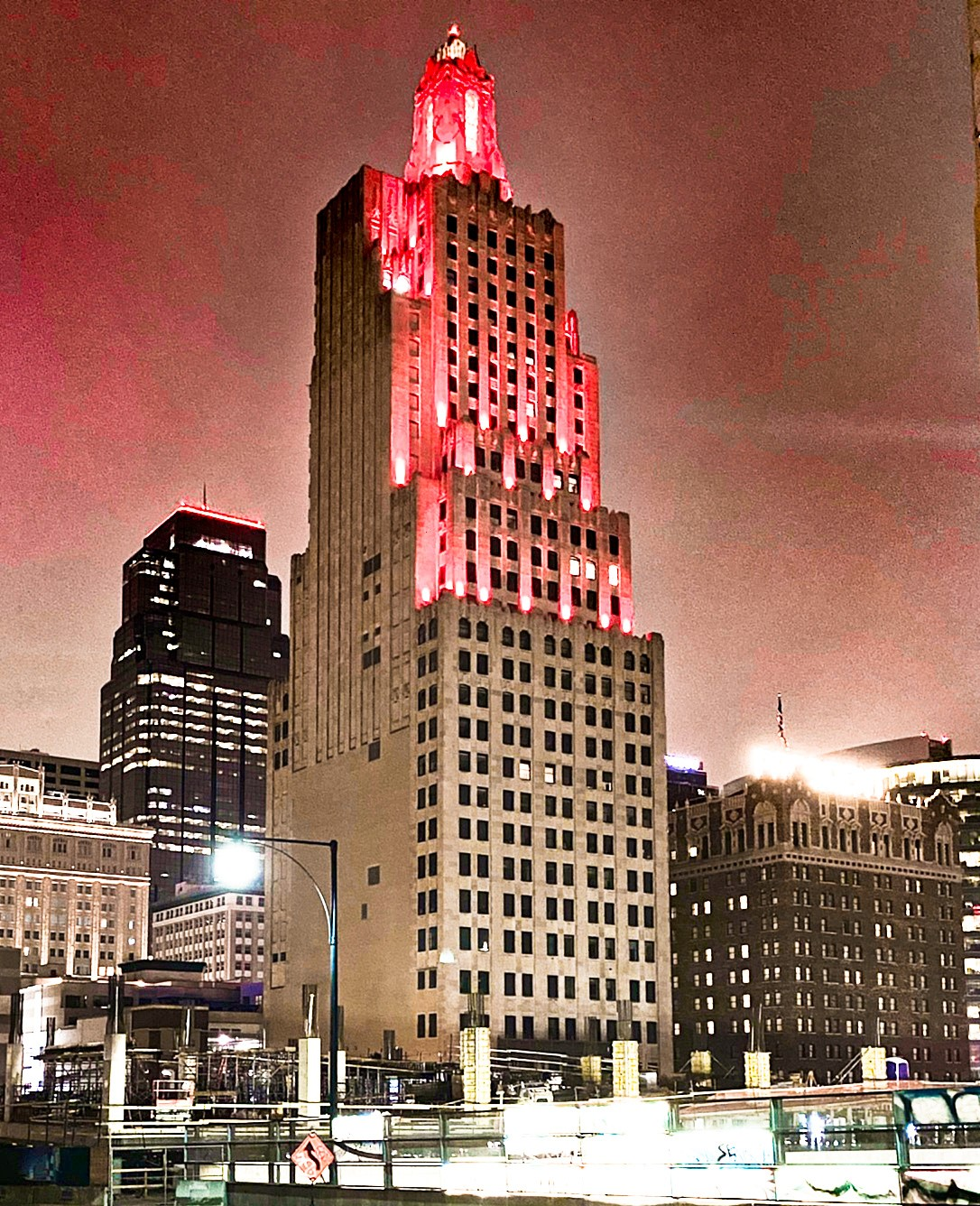
The historic Power & Light Building was built in 1933 with heavy art deco elements (2020).

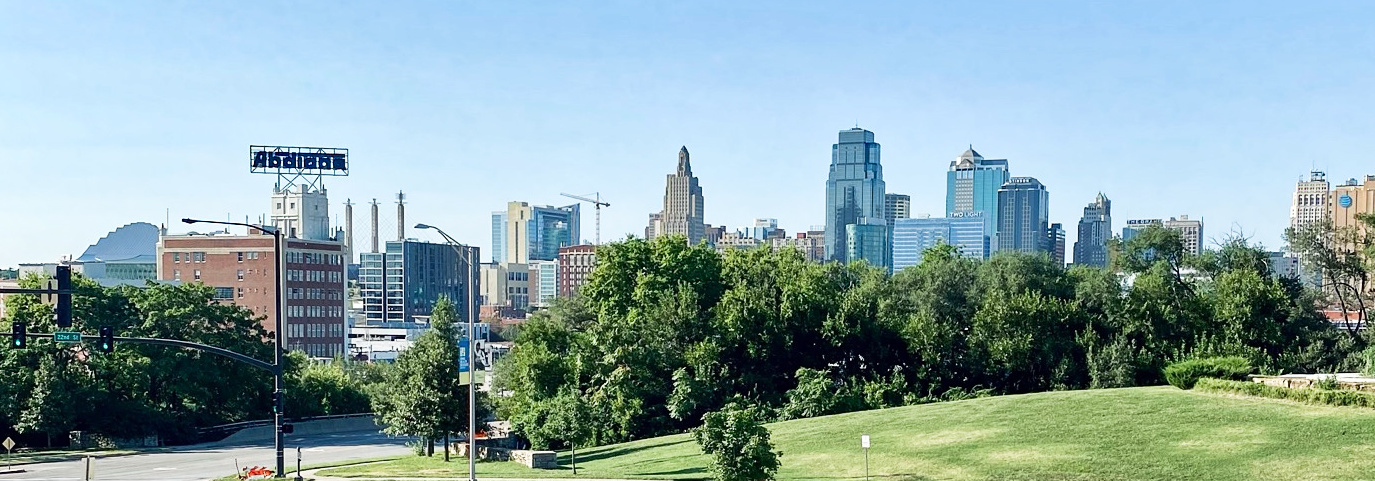
Downtown Kansas City can be viewed from the south at Hospital Hill Park (2020).

The architecture of Kansas City encompasses the metropolitan area, anchored by Kansas City, Missouri (KCMO). Major buildings by some of the world's most distinguished architects and firms include McKim, Mead and White; Jarvis Hunt; Wight and Wight; Graham, Anderson, Probst and White; Hoit, Price & Barnes; Frank Lloyd Wright; the Office of Mies van der Rohe; Barry Byrne; Edward Larrabee Barnes; Harry Weese; and Skidmore, Owings & Merrill.

Kansas City, Missouri, was founded in the 1850s at the confluence of the Missouri and Kaw (Kansas) rivers and grew with the railroads, stockyards, and meatpacking industry. Prominent citizens settled in the Quality Hill neighborhood and commissioned fine homes primarily in Italianate Renaissance Revival style, which continued to be the major influence for new structures into the 20th century. George Kessler's urban plan for Kansas City with its expansive park and boulevard system, inspired by the City Beautiful Movement, made a profound and lasting impact on the city.

The core of Downtown KCMO was developed in an early 20th-century building boom that continued into the Great Depression. Emporis ranks Kansas City among the top ten US cities for art deco architecture from then. Municipal Auditorium, the Kansas City Power and Light Building, and Jackson County Courthouse have been called "three of the nation's Art Deco treasures". J.C. Nichols, a prominent developer of commercial and residential real estate, developed the Country Club Plaza (by Edward Buehler Delk and Edward Tanner), and was active in the promotion of lasting architectural landmarks such as the Liberty Memorial (Harold Van Buren Magonigle), and the Nelson-Atkins Museum of Art (Wight and Wight).

The second period of building growth was from the 1960s through the 1980s. Then, KCMO gained many of its modern glass skyscrapers, including One Kansas City Place, which is the tallest building in Missouri at 623 feet (190 m). Suburban growth spread into Johnson County, Kansas, with new homes and mid-rise office buildings concentrated in Overland Park and Leawood, Kansas.

After urban decline and stagnation in the inner city, Downtown has been revived by several major new works of architectural design. This includes T-Mobile Center arena (2007), the Power & Light District entertainment development (2007), the Bloch Building featuring contemporary artwork added to the Nelson-Atkins Museum of Art (2007), H&R Block World Headquarters located in the Power & Light District (2006), the 2555 Grand office building near Crown Center (2003), Charles Evans Whittaker Federal Courthouse in the Government District (2000), Kemper Museum of Contemporary Art (1994), American Century Towers by the Country Club Plaza (1991 and 1994), Bartle Hall Convention Center expansion adding the iconic 4 towers with artwork atop each (1994), and the biotechnology and medical institution situated near UMKC Stowers Institute for Medical Research (1994).

== Early architecture ==
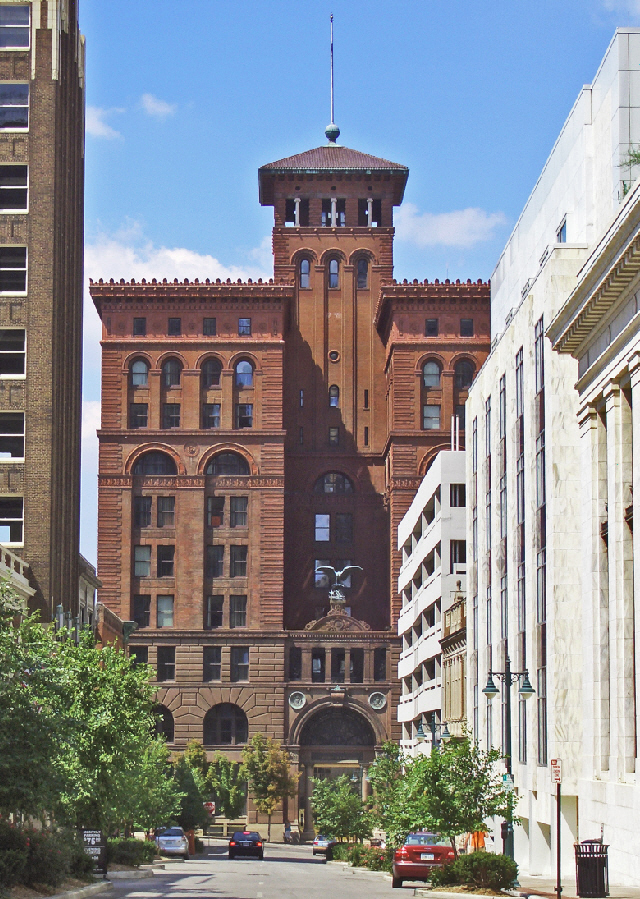
The New York Life Insurance Building (1888-1890) was designed by McKim, Mead, and White in downtown Kansas City.

Kansas City, Missouri's first highrise is the New York Life Insurance Building, completed in 1890. It has twelve floors at a height of 180 feet (55 m) and is the first local building with elevators. After the New York Life Building was completed, Kansas City followed the national trend of constructing a plethora of buildings above ten stories. Within fifty years of the building's construction, more than fifty buildings with more than ten floors each were built in and around downtown.

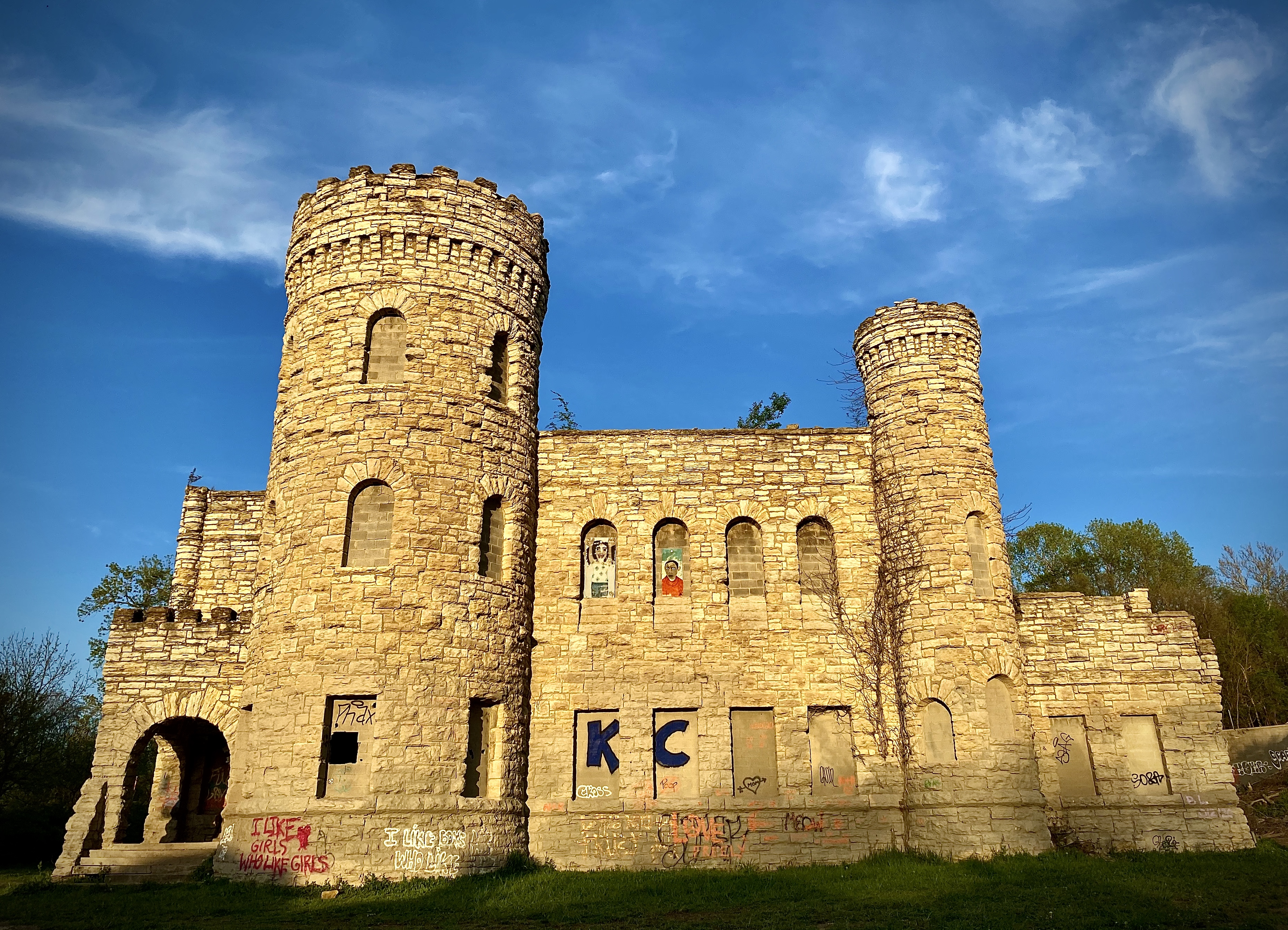
The city workhouse castle and jail was inaugurated 1897.

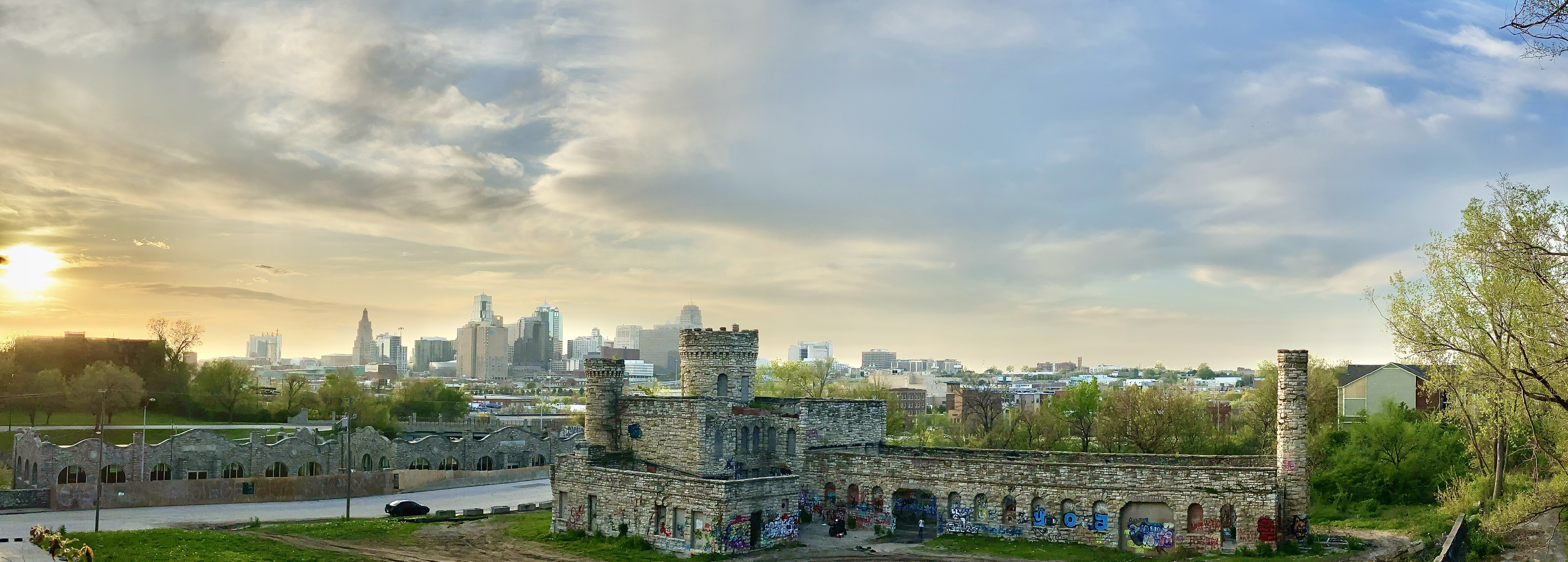
The workhouse castle neighbors abandoned city offices across Vine St, overlooking downtown KC.

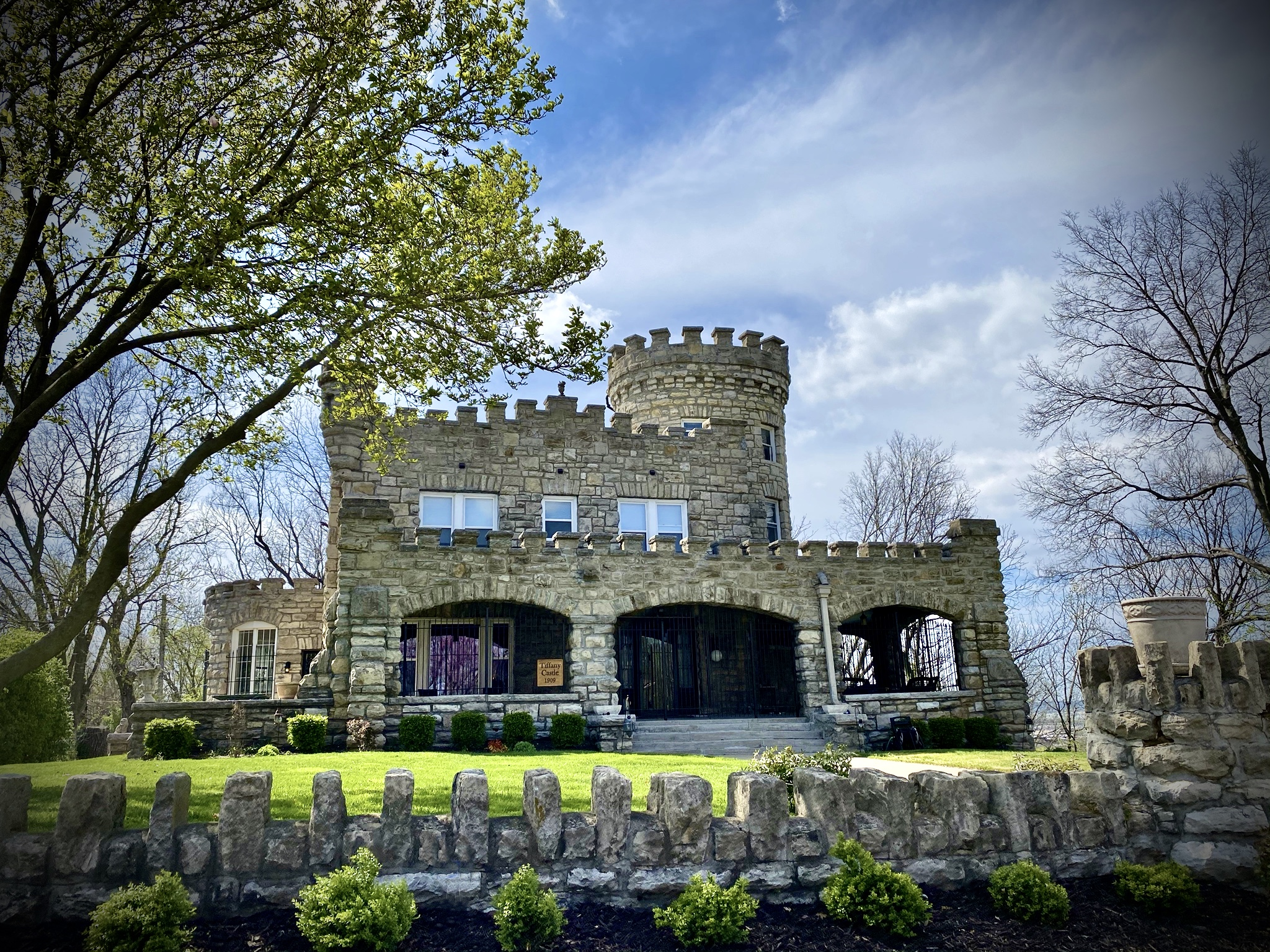
Tiffany Castle is in the historic Pendleton Heights neighborhood, built 1908.

In the late 1800s, architectural leadership of the booming Kansas City included architect James Oliver Hogg and Superintendent of Buildings A. Wallace Love. The upper class, especially those living at the segment of Troost Avenue nicknamed Millionaire's Row, considered the European castellated style to be in vogue. In 1897, the city government inaugurated one of the earliest architectural centerpieces of the area, the new city workhouse castle with dedicated jail. It was built from two-foot-thick yellow limestone, quarried onsite by inmate labor, at a total cost of US$25,700 (equivalent to about $995,000 in 2025). It was designed by Hogg and Love, with input from workhouse Superintendent Major Brant, who hailed it as "the best building Kansas City has". Its 20-foot (6.1 m) castellated towers, parapet walls, and Scotch coping were inspired by 16th century Europe's Romanesque Revival architecture to give "the impression of an ancient taronial castle". In 1908, Dr. Flavel B. Tiffany (founder of Tiffany Springs) moved away from Millionaire's Row and into his new 4,200 square feet (390 m^{2}) home called Tiffany Castle in Pendleton Heights. It was built for $75,000 (equivalent to about $2,687,000 in 2025), with walls of solid stone from a quarry at 2nd and Lydia, based on his love of the Tudor architecture of castles seen in his travels to England and Scotland.

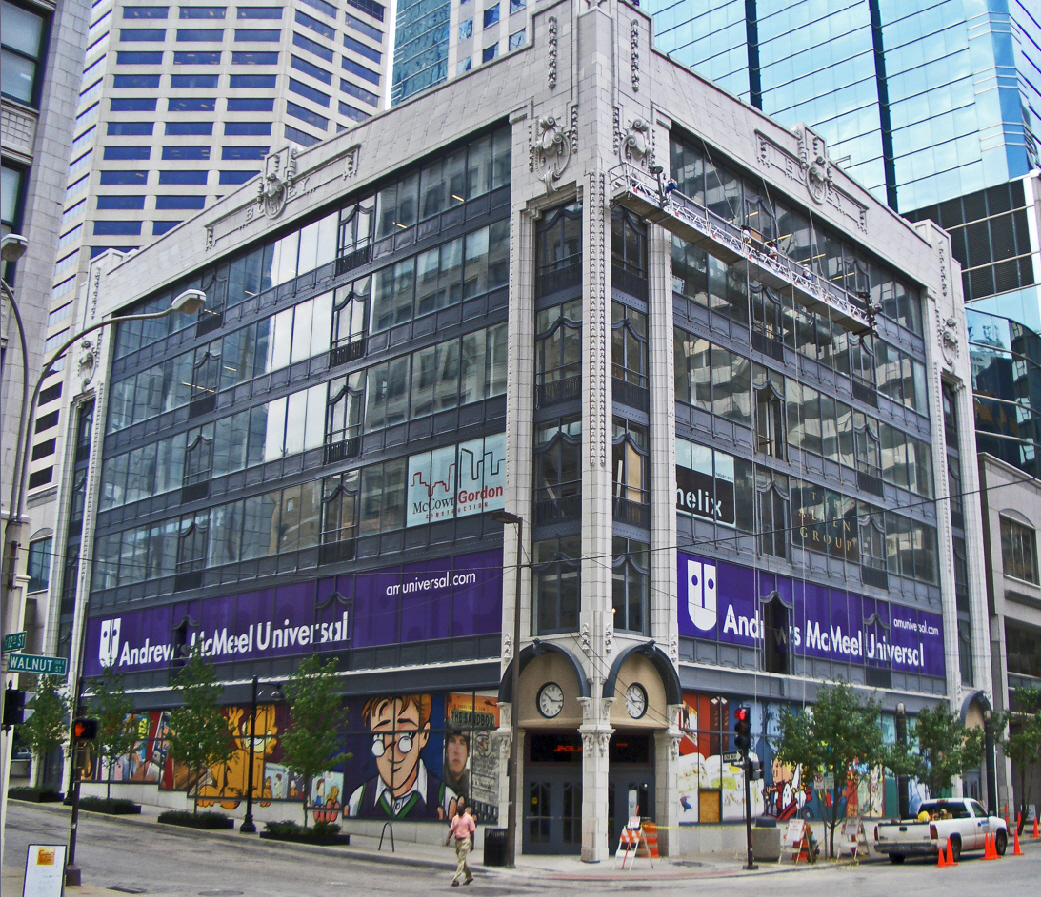
Boley Clothing Company Building (1909) is one of the world's first glass curtain-wall structures.

Louis Curtiss designed the Boley Clothing Company Building, which is renowned as "one of the first glass curtain wall structures in the world". The six-story building also features cantilever floor slabs, cast iron structural detailing, and terra cotta decorative elements.

== Art Deco, Terra Cotta, and Gothic styles ==
Kansas City's early skyscraper boom between 1920 and 1940 produced the Power and Light Building, Oak Tower, City Hall, the Jackson County Court House, the Bryant Building, and the Fidelity National Bank building. Many of these buildings are renovated, such as for residential lofts or office spaces. Oak Tower was once filled with terra cotta and gothic architecture. In an effort to modernize the then-40-year-old building in the 1970s, however, Southwestern Bell replaced its gargoyles with cladding.

== Frank Lloyd Wright ==
Frank Lloyd Wright designed three buildings in the metro: the Frank Bott Residence (1950), the Clarence Sondern House (1940), and Community Christian Church (1940).

=== Community Christian Church ===
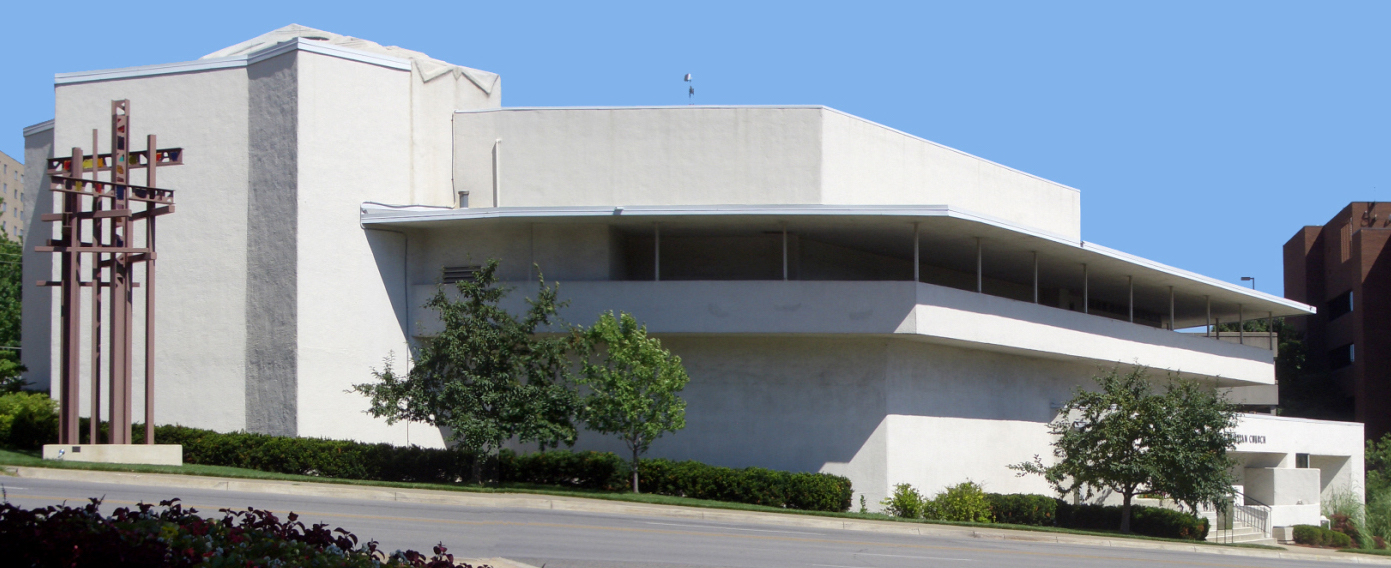
Community Christian Church was designed by Frank Lloyd Wright and is located adjacent to the Country Club Plaza.

This Frank Lloyd Wright building is on Main at East 46th Street, across from the Country Club Plaza's main shopping district. In April 1940, Community Christian Church asked Wright to design a new building after a fire had destroyed its previous church building. Wright based his design on a parallelogram including some features previously conceived for his last building for Johnson Wax Company, along with a unique spire of light. Due to high building costs, the scale of the church was reduced during construction. The auditorium was reduced from 1,200 to 900 seats, many details were eliminated, and the building was sheathed in gunite, a form of lightweight concrete, over Wright's objections. The spire of light also could not be built and illuminated due to technical limitations of the time. The church was dedicated on January 4, 1942.

In 1994, the spire of light was completed as planned. The components are housed on the church roof inside of a perforated dome on the building's northwestern corner. The spire is generated by four 16 inches (410 mm) xenon bulbs ignited by 40,000 volts, combined with a parabolic reflector to produce 300 million candela per light and totaling a nearly perfect column of 1.2 billion cp. The spire is visible for miles. It has been calculated to stop at least 3 miles (4.8 km) up above the earth, about half the maximum height at which jet airplanes fly.

== Modern and post-modern architecture ==
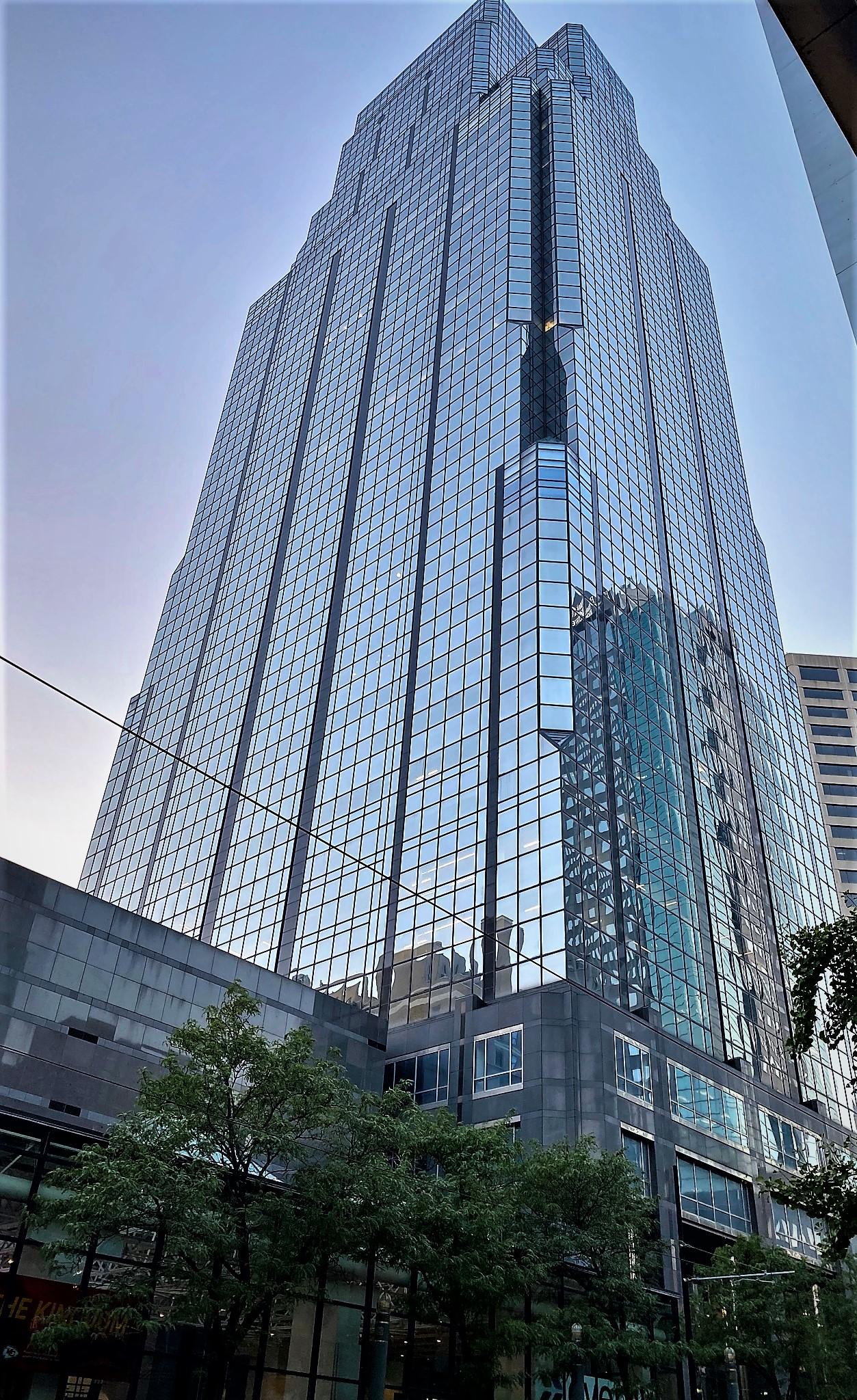
One Kansas City Place is an example of the modern glass office buildings constructed in downtown Kansas City in the 1980s. It is the tallest building in Missouri, and part of the KC skyline.

Kansas City had a building boom in the 1970s based on TWA's plans to use the city as the world hub for its new fleet of Boeing 747s and anticipated supersonic transports.

During this period, Kansas City International Airport was built to TWA's specifications so that gates were within 100 feet (30 m) of the street. Hallmark Cards began construction of Crown Center. The city commissioned the Bartle Hall convention center. Architect Helmut Jahn's first major work was the revolutionary design for Kemper Arena, which has no columns blocking sight lines and was built in 18 months, in time to attract the 1976 Republican National Convention. The optimism of this era ended when the Kemper Arena roof collapsed during a storm in 1979 (without human injury); and with the Hyatt Regency walkway collapse on July 17, 1981, which was the deadliest engineering disaster in American history. Both buildings were repaired.

TWA asked the city to extensively rebuild the terminals at the newly opened Kansas City International Airport so that it could have central checkpoints. The airport renovations were already $100 million over budget, so the city refused. As a result, TWA moved its hub to St. Louis. In 2006, the city finally announced plans for a $250 million overhaul of the terminals to accommodate the security issues.

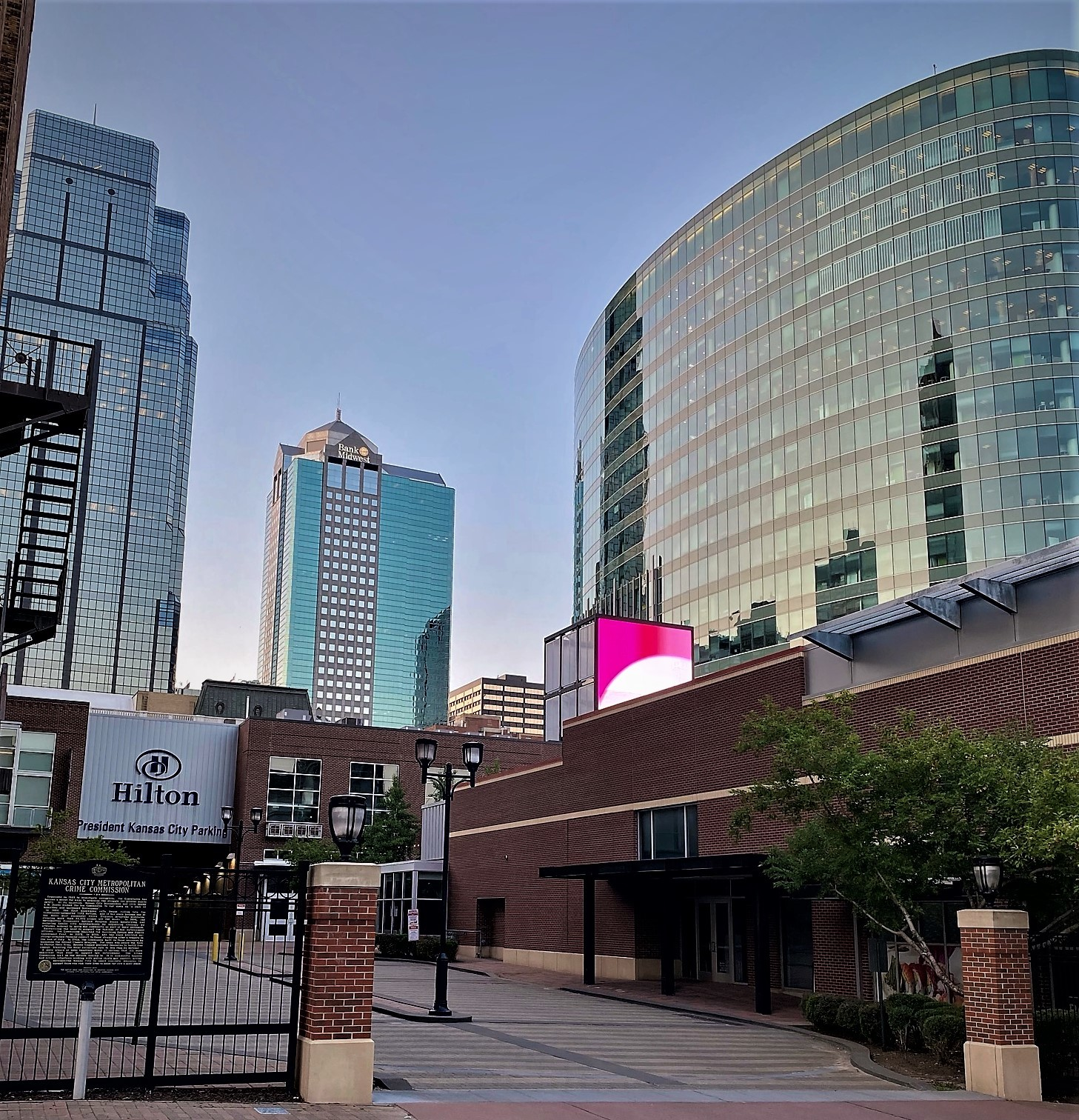
One Kansas City Place, Town Pavilion, H&R Block HQ Building

In the 1980s, the nation moved from the "modern" style of architecture (as inspired by architect Ludwig Mies van der Rohe), building large, boxy structures, to a "postmodern" style. The two most noticeable postmodern buildings in the Kansas City skyline are the Town Pavilion (built in 1986) and One Kansas City Place (1988). One Kansas City Place is a taller, glass version of City Hall. The building rises 623 feet (190 m) from its main entrance to the top of its spire and is Missouri's tallest office building.

== Original Kansas City architecture ==
Kansas City's most profound influence on national architecture is the Kansas City-style of stadium that originated with the Kivett & Myers 1967 design for the Truman Sports Complex for the Kansas City Chiefs and Kansas City Royals. In an era when new stadiums were huge multiuse arenas, Kivett & Myers proposed baseball and football have their own arenas with dimensions most favorable to their sports and then covered with a rolling roof. Virtually all major league ballparks and stadiums since then have followed that model and most have been designed by one of two Kansas City architect firms that trace their stadium business roots to Kivett -- Populous and HNTB. The firms' headquarters are a few blocks apart in Downtown Kansas City.

Kansas City calls itself the City of Fountains and has more than 200 fountains, claiming second only to Rome, Italy. Probably the most famous is the J.C. Nichols Fountain on the Country Club Plaza. It was sculpted by France's Henri Greber in 1910, with mounted equestrian figures originally planned for a Long Island estate. Each figure represents one of four great rivers of the world: Mississippi, Volga, Rhine, and Seine.

== Historical building restoration ==
=== Landmark Tower/One Park Place ===
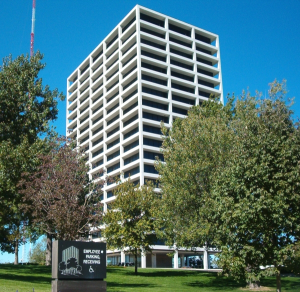
Landmark Tower is formerly the BMA Building.

This building was named the BMA (Business Men's Assurance Company) Building. It is located south of downtown at the intersection of Southwest Tfwy and 31st Street, directly across from the Fox 4 News building and towers, and on the same block as Penn Valley skatepark.

Built in 1964, Landmark Tower was designed by architects at Skidmore, Owings & Merrill, who also designed the Plaza Center Building at 800 West 47th Street. Its structural grid, which is clad in white Georgia marble, is projected out in front of the actual building. Landmark Tower earned the First Honor Award in 1964 from the American Institute of Architects and was featured in a 1965 exhibit by New York's Museum of Modern Art.

Renovation began in 2003. The only opposition occurred when developers wanted to build additional residential facilities inside the park adjacent to the tower. The One Park Place developers say the tower will hold between 150 and 200 residential units. Gastinger Walker Harden Architects is working with the developers on the renovations, respecting the original design, which was inspired by the "International" style.

=== The View ===
Vista del Rio at 600 Admiral Boulevard, was architected by John L. Daw & Associates and completed in 1967. It is the first federally approved multi-story exposed concrete structural frame building, and the first federally approved high-rise to use sheetrock for internal walls. It was originally built to inspire urban renewal in the previously dilapidated area; however, after a period of misuse, the building itself fell into deep disrepair. After much of its glass had been removed, it began to be used by more "troublesome" citizens. By the 1990s, maintenance and care became so bad that graffiti appeared throughout the structure and, unfortunately, even human remains were found around the premises. Many predicted its destruction, but downtown redevelopment renamed it The View.

=== Fidelity Bank and Trust/909 Walnut ===
This building is at 909 Walnut Street (formerly 911 Walnut Street), in the north portion of downtown's Central Business District. Constructed in 1931 (at the same time as the Power and Light Building), it is 35 stories tall.

Built to replace the Fidelity National Bank and Trust Building that had existed on that site, it was designed by Hoit, Price and Barnes Architects, the same firm that designed the Power and Light Building. It won a local American Institute of Architects award in the 1930s during its construction. The twin towers at its top resemble those of notable buildings around the United States, such as 900 North Michigan in Chicago (built in 1989), or the Waldorf-Astoria Hotel in New York City (built in 1931). The building once had a large clock in its north tower that has long since been removed.

In 2003, several proposals competed to turn this building into a residential tower. The building now houses 150-180 residential units, complete with rooftop terraces for its two multimillion-dollar penthouses.

== New development ==
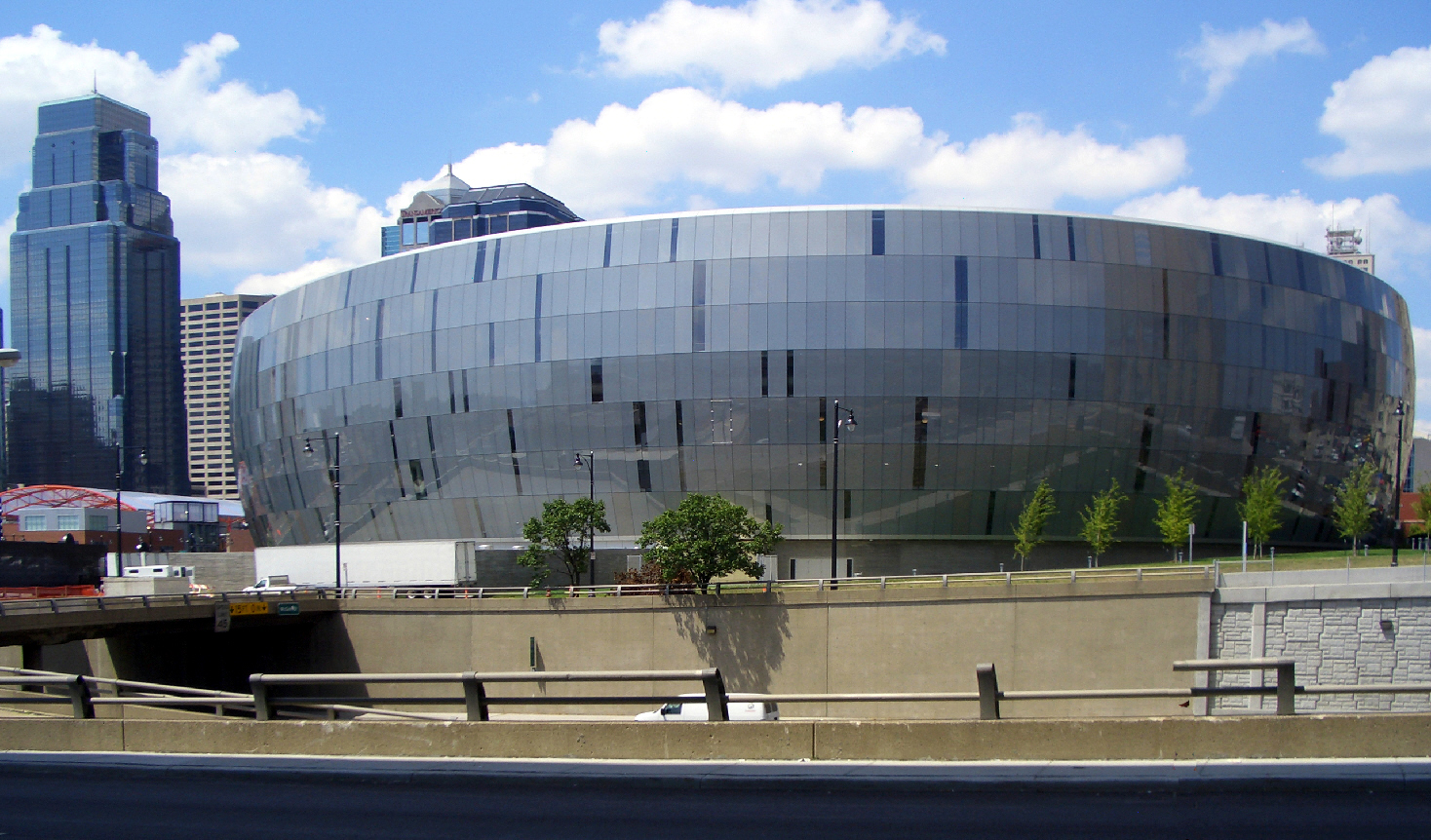
Sprint Center was opened in 2007, and renamed T-Mobile Center.

During the 1950s and 1960s, as many downtown residents moved south and north to Kansas City's sprawling suburbs, downtown's population dwindled. By the 1980s, downtown Kansas City consisted mostly of office towers, with few thriving neighborhoods remaining. However, major downtown redevelopment has brought back thousands of residents; with them has come a need for more buildings and more density.

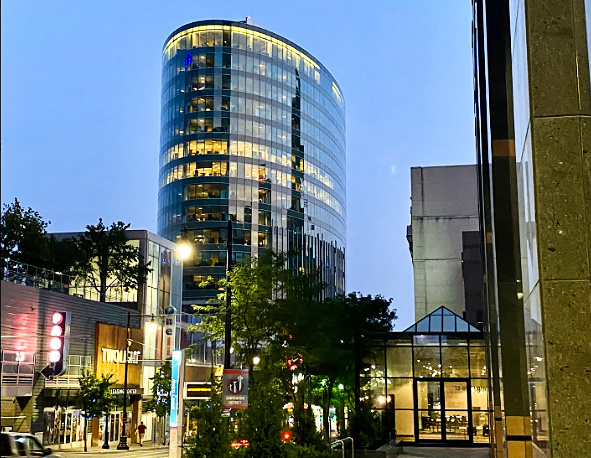
H&R Block World HQ and part of the Power & Light District

In late 2004, H&R Block announced the construction of its new headquarters, a 17-story tower downtown that was completed in early 2007. The tower serves as the anchor of a six-block entertainment district neighboring the Central Business District. This project includes five new skyscrapers intended to bring additional entertainment, jobs, and housing to downtown.

Local architectural firms have major contracts with these and other new proposals. The two biggest are the Power and Light District, designed by Cordish Company of Baltimore, Maryland, and the 18,500-seat T-Mobile Center arena, originally named Sprint Center.

On October 6, 2006, ground was broken on the Kauffman Center for the Performing Arts a 316,000-square-foot (29,400 m^{2}) performing arts center. It serves the Kansas City Metropolitan Area as host to three resident companies: the Kansas City Symphony, Ballet, and Opera. The Kauffman Center held its grand opening in September 2011.

The Federal Reserve Bank of Kansas City completed the building of a new headquarters located southwest of Crown Center.

Name	Floors	Year Completed	Use
2555 Grand	26	2003	Office
H&R Block Tower	17	2006	Office
Kirkwood Circle	13	2005	Residential
4646 Broadway	13	2007	Residential
Federal Reserve HQ	14	2007	Office
Plaza Colonnade	10	2004	Office
Plaza Vista	10	2013	Office
One Light	25	2015	Residential
Two Light	23	2017	Residential
Three Light	25	2023	Residential
Loews Kansas City Hotel	30	2020	Hotel

== See also ==
- Architectural style
- List of tallest buildings in Missouri
- Skyscraper
- Urban planning
- List of crossings of the Missouri River
- List of tallest buildings in Kansas City, Missouri

=== National Register of Historic Places ===
- List of Registered Historic Places in Jackson County
- List of Registered Historic Places in Clay County
- List of Registered Historic Places in Platte County
