= Prospect Avenue (Kansas City, Missouri) =

Major street in Kansas City, Missouri, United States

- Interactive map of Prospect Avenue
- Length: 10.5 mi (16.9 km)
- Coordinates: 39°2′13.13″N 94°33′16.46″W
- North: E Reservoir Drive
- South: Blue River Road

Other
- Known for: Racist dividing line, King assassination riots

Prospect Avenue is one of the major north–south streets in Kansas City, Missouri and the Kansas City metropolitan area. It begins in the north at E Reservoir Drive in the Pendleton Heights neighborhood of the Historic Northeast and stretches south for 10.5 miles to its southern terminus at Blue River Road. It runs closely parallel to U.S. Route 71 from Swope Parkway to 75th Street.

== History ==
Segregation, Jim Crow laws, and redlining kept Black Kansas Citians east of Troost Avenue for much of the mid-20th century. Prospect became one of the main commercial thoroughfares of the East Side during the 1950s and 1960s, providing the entertainment that the African-American community was barred from in locations such as Westport, the River Quay, and the Country Club Plaza. Decades of municipal disinvestment caught up in the late 20th century, leading the one-time hub of neighborhood businesses and commercial activity to become a corridor of blight and decay. Similar to revitalization projects across the East Side (such as those on Troost Avenue and The Paseo, grassroots organizations have championed efforts since the 2010s to make the Prospect Corridor safer and attract investment to boost development.

Prospect Avenue played a pivotal role in Kansas City's response to the assassination of civil rights activist Martin Luther King Jr. in April 1968. As a result, a three-block area of Prospect Avenue near E 31st Street was burned down.

As part of the 50-year transition to the South Midtown Freeway, US Route 71 was moved concurrent to Prospect Avenue in 1968, between Interstate 70 and 77th Street. Route 71 was then slowly built onto the Freeway, with Prospect Avenue slowly losing the designation from the south through the Freeway's completion in 2001.

== Points of interest ==
- Kessler Park, located at Prospect Avenue's northern terminus
- The historic 18th and Vine neighborhood, located along Prospect avenue between E Truman Road and E 18th Street
- KIPP: KC Endeavor Academy is located at E 18th Street and Prospect Avenue
- Kansas City Police Department - East Patrol, headquartered at 2640 Prospect Avenue
- Lucile H. Bluford Library, located at 3050 Prospect
- Brush Creek, located along Prospect Avenue between Emanuel Cleaver II Boulevard and Dr. Martin Luther King Jr. Blvd
- Research Medical Center, located at 2316 Meyer Boulevard, facing Prospect Avenue between E 63rd Street and E Meyer Boulevard
- Blue River, located at Prospect Avenue's southern terminus
