= Swan Creek =

Swan Creek may refer to:

== Australia ==
- Swan Creek, Queensland, a locality in the Southern Downs Region

== United States ==
- Swan Creek (Indian River tributary), a tributary to Indian River in Sussex County, Delaware
- Swan Creek (Maryland), a tributary of the Susquehanna River
- Swan Creek, North Carolina
- Swan Creek AVA, American viticultural area in North Carolina
- Swan Creek (St. Joseph River) a stream in Saginaw County, Michigan
- Swan Creek Township, Saginaw County, Michigan
- Swan Creek (Gasconade River), a stream in Missouri
- Swan Creek (White River), a stream in southern Missouri
- Swan Creek Township, Fulton County, Ohio
- Swan Creek Preserve Metropark, Toledo, Ohio

== See also ==
- Big Swan Creek
