= Panther Creek (Brush Creek tributary) =

Stream in the American state of Missouri

Panther Creek is a stream in Polk, Hickory and St. Clair counties of southwest Missouri. It is a tributary of Brush Creek.

The stream headwaters are in northwest Polk County at 37°46′56″N 93°30′33″W and the confluence with Brush Creek in southeast St. Clair County is at 37°49′54″N 93°37′41″W. The stream source lies east of Missouri Route 13 southwest of Humansville. The stream flows north to northeast and turns westward just south of Flemington and then northwest entering the southwest corner of Hickory County where it passes under Missouri Route 123. It enters St. Claire County and meanders back into Polk County and then back into St. Clair County where it passes under Route 13 to its confluence with Brush Creek.

Panther Creek was named on account of panthers in the area.

== See also ==
- List of rivers of Missouri
