= Penn Valley Park =

Urban park in Kansas City, Missouri, US

Coordinates: 39.077°N 94.589°W

Penn Valley Park is an urban park overlooking the Downtown Kansas City, Missouri.

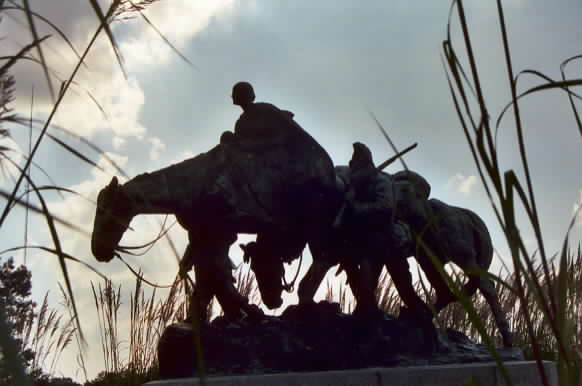
Pioneer Mother statue by Alexander Phimister Proctor portraying Howard Vanderslice being carried as a baby to Kansas City.

The 176-acre (0.71 km^{2}) park was developed in 1904 on land through which the Santa Fe Trail had passed. It contains several famous landmarks: The Scout statue and the United States' official National World War I Museum and Memorial with its Liberty Memorial. The grounds also feature such commemorative statues as the Pioneer Mother Memorial and The Hiker.

The park has a large lake, a fitness trail, tennis courts and ball fields and is a popular spot for concerts and festivals during the summer months. Also features Kansas City's first off-leash dog park and is the host park to both the Penn Valley skatepark located in the southwestern corner of the park and the Just Off Broadway Theatre.

The Federal Reserve's new regional headquarters building is located just east of the park.
