= Howard Vanderslice =

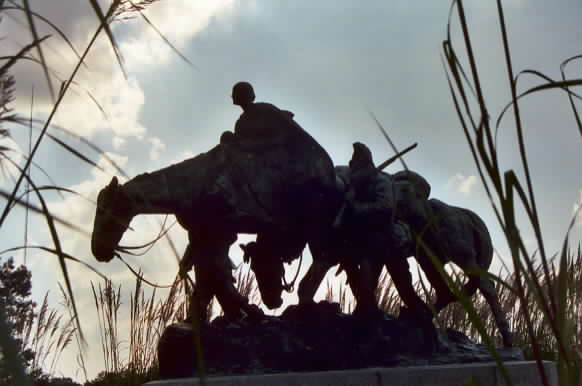
Pioneer Mother statue with Howard Vanderslice being carried as a baby.

Howard Vanderslice (April 8, 1853 – October 10, 1929) was a Kansas City, Missouri businessman who donated the land that forms the campus of today's Kansas City Art Institute.

== Early life ==
Vanderslice was born in Great Crossing, Kentucky in Scott County, Kentucky.

Vanderslice was four months old when his parents moved to Doniphan County, in the then Kansas Territory. He is portrayed as the baby being carried in the Pioneer Mother statue by Alexander Phimister Proctor in Penn Valley Park (which portrays his grandfather Daniel Vanderslice agent to the tribes and Vanderslice's father Thomas J. Vanderslice and mother). Vanderslice gave the statue to the city in 1927.

However other biographies say that he came to Kansas City in 1890.

He went to school at a log school house, then attended Highland University at Highland, Kansas, until he was 19.

== Career ==
After quitting school, he became a station agent at Iowa Point for the Atchison & Nebraska Railroad, which is now known as Burlington. He learned telegraphy there, and stayed until 1881 when he started his own grain business. He started the business, Emerson & Vanderslice, with his partner, D. M. Emerson, but when he died in 1882, Vanderslice took it over until 1888 when he sold it.

President Cleveland appointed Vanderslice as postmaster of White Cloud, and he served in that capacity from 1885 to 1889.

He was head of the Vanderslice-Lynds Mercantile Company by 1889, which became the City Ice & Storage Company. This company supplied practically all of the ice for Kansas City for nearly 9 years.

Vanderslice was active in the business community and participated on several boards and in clubs. He was treasurer of the Lucky Tiger Combination Gold Mining Company, vice president of the White Eagle Oil and Refining Company, president of the Eagle Elevator Company, the Kansas City Club, Mid-Day Club, Congressional Golf Club, and the Chamber of Commerce. He was also a Mason at Smithton Lodge Number One in Highland and members of the Orient Chapter, Oriental Commandery No. 35, and Ararat Temple of Kansas City.

In 1927 Vanderslice purchased the August R. Meyer residence and 8 acres (32,000 m^{2}) at 44th and Warwick Boulevard adjacent to the about to be built Nelson-Atkins Museum of Art. He donated the land to the Kansas City Art Institute and it makes up the school's main campus. The residence was later renamed "Vanderslice Hall"
