= Penn Valley skatepark =

Coordinates: 39.0725°N 94.5925°W

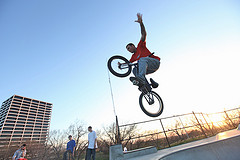
Penn Valley skatepark

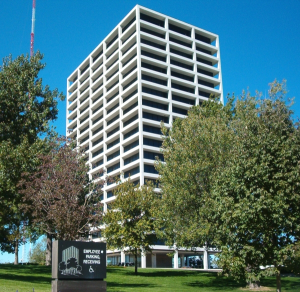
The One Park Place Building, formerly the BMA Building. The skatepark is located on the other side of this building.

Penn Valley Skatepark is one of the more recent additions to the park, and is also known as Kansas City Skate Plaza because of the similar appearance of a "plaza-type" Skatepark. Officially opened in late Fall of 2005, Escapist Skateboarding has hosted at least five separate skateboard demonstrations, including Zero Skateboards, Circa Shoes, and Toy Machine.

== Description ==
The park is not fully "completed", plans were to have a larger park, taking over the complete infenced area, however, the city underestimated the costs, and the $380,000 budget was soon drained. The park is still functional despite not being 100% complete, and also is one of the most sought after Skateparks in Missouri. Locals can be seen at Penn Valley Skatepark on a daily basis, mainly because of the many different aspects of the park itself. Also the park is so close to the Kansas border that it makes it a quick drive from both sides of the border. [edit] The park is completed now thanks to a donation by Rob Drydek and street league.

A series of three smaller banks leading to one large bank make up the "Street Course", or Plaza, on the east side of the park. The southern portion of the park includes a set of stairs, and a foot-tall square "handrail". This is the part of the skatepark that is considered unfinished, and grass is now growing where the original park was intended to continue. On the west side of the park can be found the most remarkable feature of the park, the Bowl. The Bowl is 6 foot-deep, that waterfalls to a 9 foot-deeper end. The bowl is very well constructed, with real concrete pool coping and tile on one side. This feature attracts many of the "old-school" skateboarders from the bowl skateboarding eras of the 1970s and 80s, they bring with them a unique style that is rare in today's skateboarding generation.

== Location ==
The skatepark itself shares a group of tennis courts, and basketball court. It overlooks Downtown Kansas City. The park practically shares a parking-lot with One-Park Place, a recognizable building in the Kansas City Skyline. Also the park is close to Penn Tower. The Park rests atop the same grass hill as the Kansas City Scout Statue, and has views of Liberty Memorial and the Federal Building.
