= Brush Creek Township, Ohio =

Brush Creek Township, Ohio, may refer to:

- Brush Creek Township, Adams County, Ohio
- Brush Creek Township, Jefferson County, Ohio
- Brush Creek Township, Muskingum County, Ohio
- Brush Creek Township, Scioto County, Ohio

== See also ==
- Brushcreek Township, Ohio
- Brush Creek Township (in other states)
