= 1968 Kansas City, Missouri, riot =

Riot following the assassination of Martin Luther King Jr.

1968 Kansas City riot
- Part of the King assassination riots
- Date: April 9–10, 1968
- Location: Kansas City, Missouri, United States
- Caused by: Assassination of Martin Luther King Jr.

Parties
State of Missouri; Missouri National Guard; Missouri State Highway Patrol; Kansas City Police Department	civilians

Casualties
- Deaths: 6 civilians
- Injuries: ~40 civilians 26 officers
- Arrested: Between 300 and 1,042

The 1968 Kansas City riot occurred in April 1968. Kansas City became one of 37 cities in the United States to be the subject of rioting after the assassination of Martin Luther King Jr. The rioting in Kansas City did not erupt on April 4, like other cities of the United States affected directly by the assassination, but rather on April 9 after local events within the city.

== Background ==
=== Thursday, April 4 ===
Following King's assassination, Kansas City was engulfed in "more an atmosphere of stunned shock than a real threat of violence". A prominent Black minister held a meeting that evening to plan for a memorial march.

=== Friday, April 5 ===
On the morning of April 5, leaders of the Kansas City Black community met with representatives of the Kansas City, Missouri, Police Department (KCPD) to approve a memorial march tentatively planned for Sunday, April 7. In Kansas City, Kansas, a meeting of students, police, and community leaders was held and then an impromptu march was spearheaded by high school students on Friday, April 5. Between 1,500 and 2,000 are estimated to have participated in this peaceful march, which ended with addresses from Kansas City, Kansas Mayor Joseph H. McDowell and other officials at Kansas City, Kansas, City Hall. That evening, Kansas City, Missouri, Police Chief Clarence M. Kelley returned to Kansas City and implemented a riot control alert.

=== Sunday, April 7 ===
Before the march, McDowell and Kansas City Missouri Mayor Ilus W. Davis took part in a televised forum with local civil rights leaders. The march proceeded as planned at 1:30pm, with between 5,000 and 15,000 in attendance. Police responded to a minor incident at the Isis Theater located at 31st Street and Troost Avenue. Kansas City Public Schools (KCPS) Superintendent James Hazlett concluded that a newly built junior high school on the East Side would be named for King; a one-minute meditation was planned for Tuesday, April 9, the day of King's funeral; the flags would be at half staff; and the schools would remain open.

=== Monday, April 8 ===
Under pressure from civil rights organizations, KCPS opted to hold school-wide memorial assemblies in place of one-minute meditations. Similarly pressured, Kansas City, Kansas, school administrators met with representatives of the Kansas City, Kansas, Police Department, and publicly announced their intent to close schools the following day out of respect. KCPS administrators were unable to contact Hazlett or the President of the KCPS Board that evening to discuss these changes, so schools remained open.

KCPS coordinator Alvin Brooks had witnessed Superintendent Hazlett's decision and later recounted that it "wasn't good enough for [the community], but it was good enough for [KCPS] and so that's why the schools were open. As a result of that, we had a riot."

== Riots ==
=== Tuesday, April 9 ===
Protests began in earnest on Tuesday, April 9, as a staged walkout of students from several KCPS schools, boycotting the KCPS's decision to remain open. Student leaders were split between marching from school to school before holding a memorial service and proceeding Downtown to protest. As several non-students joined the march, the decision was made to dismiss school to avoid property damage. The protest, rapidly turning from a student march to a civil rights organization, met with Mayor Davis at Parade Park. There, the decision was made to continue the march, led in part by Mayor Davis, to Kansas City City Hall, where they were met with police and Missouri State Highway Patrol.

Following short remarks from leaders at City Hall, the protesters were requested to return to the East Side, either on foot or on buses provided by the city. Many in the crowd did not hear the announcement due to poor sound systems, and as such were forced to disperse. Mayor Davis later apologized publicly for police use of tear gas in response to what one KCPD officer remembered as "one single, soft drink bottle [which] wasn't even close to the officers", widely seen as direct escalation of the conflict. Despite Mayor Davis declaring a state of emergency and setting the city's first emergency curfew at 8:00pm, riots began in earnest that night. Reports of stonings, lootings, and 94 fires (40 confirmed) as arson led to nine injuries and one death at the hands of the KCPD and 11 unrelated injuries.

That morning, Governor Warren E. Hearnes had authorized the deployment of 1,000 Missouri National Guardsmen (MONG) in Kansas City. Hazlett returned that evening from Washington, D.C., and conferred with Mayor Davis; the outcome was that KCPS schools would remain open the following day.

=== Wednesday, April 10 ===
Unrest continued into April 10 as tensions and police presence remained high. At Lincoln High School, an altercation between students and a KCPD/MONG joint patrol ended with tear gas and early school dismissal. A molotov cocktail was thrown near Central High School. A white priest was threatened at Troost Lake Park.

At around 7:00pm, the MONG and KCPD responded to a reports of unruly crowds gathering at 30th Street and Prospect Avenue near the Byron Hotel. A National Guardsman attempting to control the crowd was shot at and wounded in the arm. A firefight broke out between officers and purported anti-patrolman "snipers". Law enforcement focused fire on the Byron Hotel, where the Guardsman believed the shot had originated from. Gas canisters eventually forced the hotel to evacuate but the haze, combined with officer shooting out lights, led to more confusion. In other incidents near the same time, another Guardsman and a fire captain were injured nearby.

Altercations occurred throughout the East Side as other, smaller incidents were reported in the Country Club District, in Kansas City, Kansas, and in Olathe, Kansas. Mayor McDowell issued a curfew proclamation at 8:35pm and began utilizing the Kansas National Guard to enforce police presence. Mayor Davis, who had wished a second curfew would not be necessary, followed at 9:00pm. Governor Hearnes authorized a total of 2,900 Missouri National Guardsmen to be reassigned to Kansas City, after which he and Lieutenant Governor Thomas Eagleton met with Davis and KCPD Chief Kelley. The night ended with 45 more counts of arson, 5 additional civilian deaths, 11 civilian injuries in addition to 4 injuries sustained by officers.

== Aftermath ==
"Activity diminished considerably" on April 11, so Mayor Davis and Chief Kelley met with representatives of the young protesters on April 12. Though the meeting was inconclusive, it quickly ushered about an end to the violence.

Fires destroyed many homes and local businesses on the East Side, particularly along Prospect Avenue between 27th and 39th Streets and on 31st and 35th Streets east of Prospect Avenue.

In May 1968, Mayor Davis charged a commission with studying what was referred to as a "severe civil disturbance". The report, published in August 1968, proposed 17 recommendations to the KCPD, 12 recommendations to the KCPS, 9 recommendations to other municipal authorities, and 5 recommendations with no particular target audience.

== See also ==
- Ferguson unrest
- List of incidents of civil unrest in the United States
