= Swan Creek (Gasconade River tributary) =

Stream in the US state of Missouri

Swan Creek is a stream in Osage County in Missouri. It is a tributary of the Gasconade River.

The stream headwaters are at 38°27′50″N 91°52′39″W and the confluence with the Gasconade is at 38°23′27″N 91°49′11″W. The stream source arises on the southeast side of Pea Ridge and Missouri Route U and south of Linn. The stream flows southeast passing under Missouri Route 89 just prior to entering a sharp meander of the Gasconade. The community of Rich Fountain lies to the west of the confluence on Brush Creek.

Swan Creek was named for the fact swans frequented a lake near its course.

== See also ==
- List of rivers of Missouri
