= Brush Creek Township =

Brush Creek Township may refer to the following townships in the United States:

- Brush Creek Township, Washington County, Arkansas
- Brush Creek Township, Faribault County, Minnesota
- Brush Creek Township, Gasconade County, Missouri
- Brush Creek Township, Wright County, Missouri
- Brush Creek Township, Adams County, Ohio
- Brush Creek Township, Jefferson County, Ohio
- Brush Creek Township, Muskingum County, Ohio
- Brush Creek Township, Scioto County, Ohio
- Brush Creek Township, Fulton County, Pennsylvania

== See also ==
- Brushcreek Township, Ohio
