= Brush Creek (Missouri River tributary) =

Stream in Missouri, United States

Coordinates: 39°11′09″N 94°46′00″W

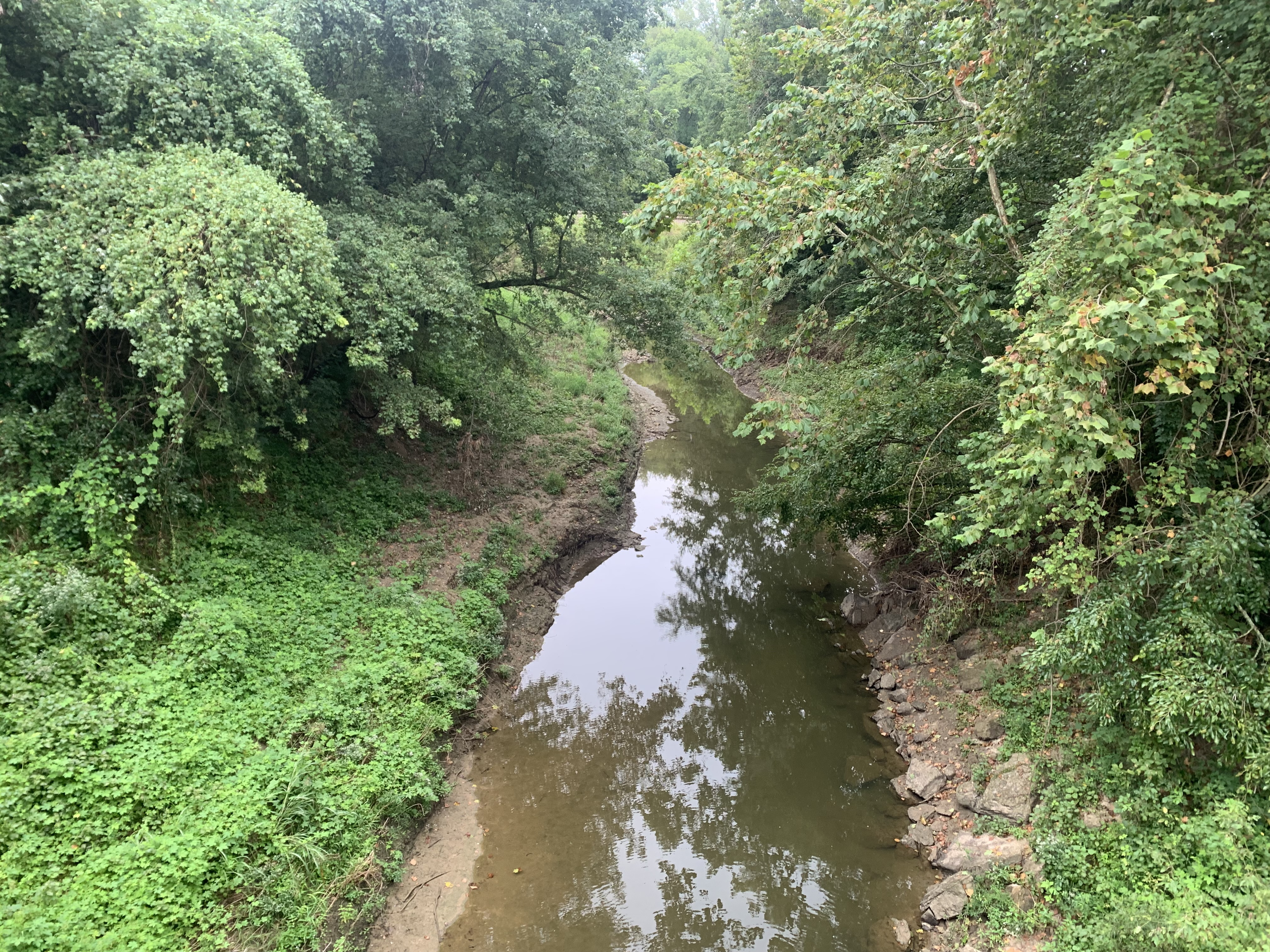
Brush Creek at NW River Rd in western Parkville, Missouri

Brush Creek is a stream in Platte County in the U.S. state of Missouri. It is a tributary of the Missouri River.

Brush Creek was so named on account of brush near its course.

== Course ==
Brush Creek headwaters northwest of Tiffany Springs, Kansas City beside Interstate 29 and flows west-southwest for about 4 miles. Then, around Interstate 435 the stream turns southward and travels about 5 miles before reaching the Missouri River.

== Tributaries ==
There are 2 named direct tributaries of Brush Creek, Hayes Creek and Naylor Creek.
