= Tiffany Castle =

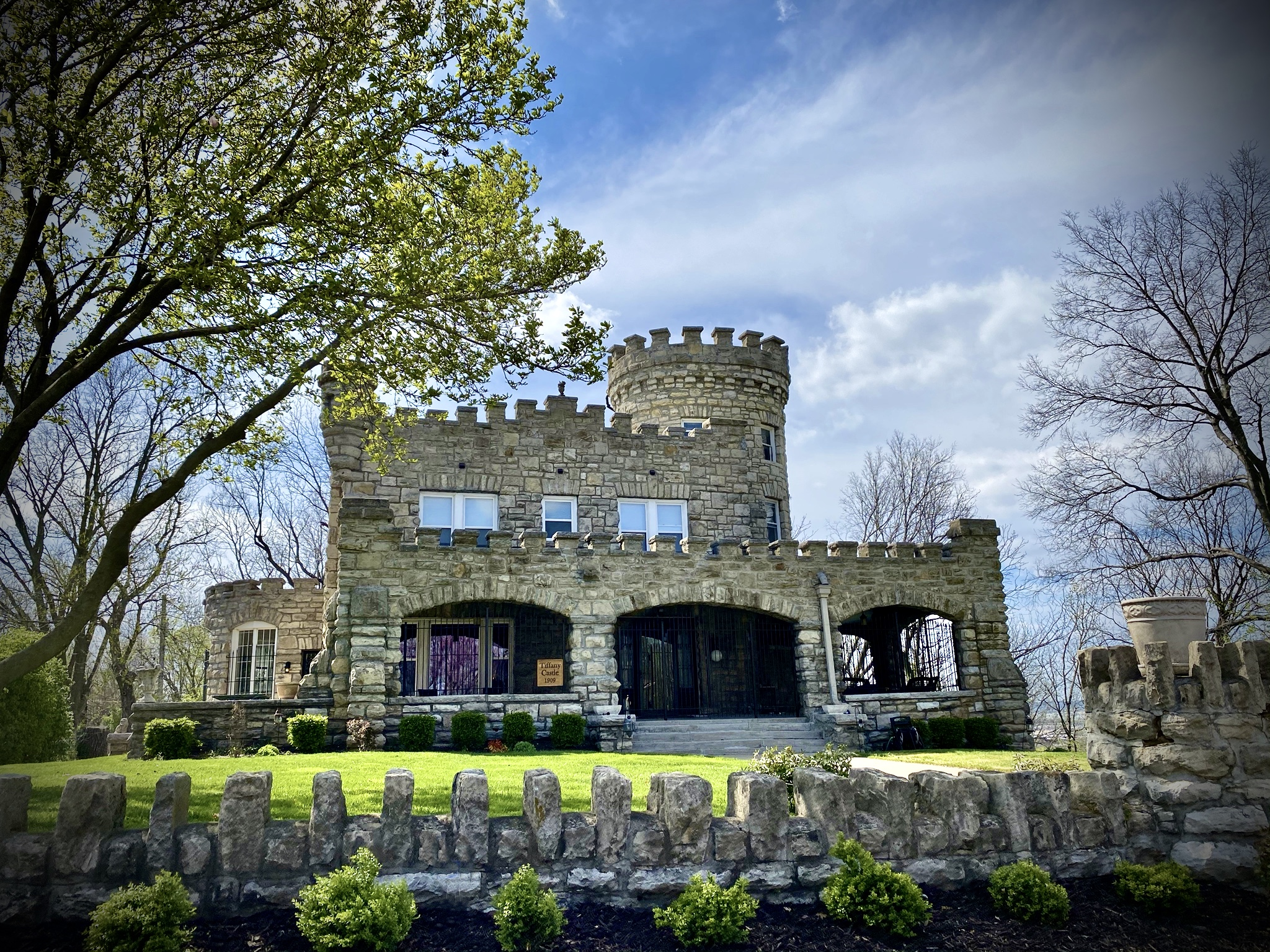
- Interactive map of Tiffany Castle
- 39°6′49.7622″N 94°33′27.5472″W
- Type: Residence
- Location: 100 Garfield Ave, Kansas City, Missouri, United States

History
- Built: 1909; 117 years ago
- Built for: Flavel B. Tiffany
- Original use: Residence

Site notes
- Elevation: 992 feet (302 m)
- Area: 4,200 square feet (390 m^{2})
- Architect: Clifton C. Sloan
- Architectural style: Tudor architecture
- Current use: Residence
- Website: facebook.com/tiffanycastlekc/

Tiffany Castle is a landmark home in the historic Pendleton Heights neighborhood in Kansas City, Jackson County, Missouri, United States. It was built in 1909 as the home of ophthalmologist Flavel Tiffany, who later founded the Tiffany Springs neighborhood of Kansas City. The Tudor architecture castle sits on the bluffs overlooking the East Bottoms and the Missouri River below, and can be seen for miles.

== History ==
Tiffany Castle is named after its builder and first owner, Dr. Flavel B. Tiffany. He was the most prolific of the first ophthalmologists in Kansas City, Missouri, living on Troost Avenue's "Millionaire Row" between 26th and 32nd streets. He had traveled England and Scotland, and loved the Tudor architecture of castles, so he wanted to build one at 100 Garfield Ave in Kansas City. Its floors and roof are made of reinforced concrete, with walls of solid stone from a quarry at 2nd and Lydia. It was completed in 1908, at 4,200 square feet (390 m^{2}) and for more than US$75,000 (equivalent to about $2,687,000 in 2025). It is on the bluffs at the edge of Historic Northeast Kansas City, overlooking the East Bottoms and the Missouri River below, and can be seen for miles.

Tiffany's major real estate endeavor was founding the town of Tiffany Springs, which he intended to become a major spa resort to rival the successful Excelsior Springs, Missouri. In the late 1880s, he bought 1,100 acres (450 ha) in central Platte County which includes an Artesian aquifer, but his plans were not substantially realized. In 1962, the city of Kansas City, Missouri annexed most of this land, much of which became the Kansas City International Airport. Tiffany Springs is now a neighborhood of Kansas City.

The home has been sold eight times since, including in 2015 for $600,000, and is part of the neighborhood's tradition of historical Christmas tours.

== See also ==
- City workhouse castle, the other castle in Kansas City
- List of points of interest in Kansas City, Missouri
