= Brush Creek (Lamine River tributary) =

Stream in the American state of Missouri

Coordinates: 38.9055767°N 92.9693615°W

Brush Creek is a stream in Cooper County in the U.S. state of Missouri. It is a tributary of the Lamine River.

Brush Creek most likely was descriptively named for the brush along its course.

== See also ==
- List of rivers of Missouri
