= Brush Creek Township, Wright County, Missouri =

Township in the American state of Missouri

Brush Creek Township
- Inactive township
- Interactive map of Brush Creek Township
- Coordinates: 37.3024914°N 92.4722146°W
- Country: United States
- State: Missouri
- County: Wright
- Erected: 1841
- Named for: Brush Creek
- Time zone: UTC−6 (CST)
  - Summer (DST): UTC−5 (CDT)

Brush Creek Township is an inactive township in Wright County, in the U.S. state of Missouri.

It was erected in 1841, taking its name from a creek of the same name within its borders.
