= Brush Creek, West Virginia =

Unincorporated community in West Virginia, United States

Brush Creek
- Unincorporated community
- Location within the state of West Virginia Brush Creek (the United States)
- Coordinates: 38°8′37″N 81°45′19″W
- Country: United States
- State: West Virginia
- County: Boone
- Elevation: 774 ft (236 m)
- Time zone: UTC-5 (Eastern (EST))
  - Summer (DST): UTC-4 (EDT)
- GNIS ID: 1741714

Brush Creek is an unincorporated community and coal town in Boone County, West Virginia, United States. Its post office has closed.
