= Brush Creek (Thompson River tributary) =

Stream in the American state of Missouri

Coordinates: 40.441949°N 93.7938364°W

Brush Creek is a stream in Harrison County in the U.S. state of Missouri. It is a tributary of the Thompson River.

Brush Creek most likely was named for the brush lining its course.

== See also ==
- List of rivers of Missouri
