= Brush Creek (Fox River tributary) =

Stream in the American state of Missouri

Coordinates: 40.4350412°N 91.6496063°W

Brush Creek is a stream in Clark County in the U.S. state of Missouri. It is a tributary of the Fox River.

Brush Creek was so named on account of thick brush along its course.

== See also ==
- List of rivers of Missouri
