= Brush Creek, Williamson County, Tennessee =

Brush Creek, Tennessee
- Unincorporated community
- Location within Tennessee Location within the United States
- Coordinates: 36°00′26″N 87°04′53″W
- Country: United States
- State: Tennessee
- County: Williamson
- Elevation: 846 ft (258 m)
- Time zone: UTC-6 (Central (CST))
  - Summer (DST): UTC-5 (CDT)
- Area code: 615
- GNIS feature ID: 1278670

Brush Creek is an unincorporated community in northwestern Williamson County, Tennessee, United States.

== Historical Features ==
=== Isola Bella Plantation ===
The Isola Bella Plantation's previous owner was Franklin Pike and it is an antebellum home just south of Concord Road. Valued at 3.9 million dollars, the home originally had approximately 6,000 square feet. The original build date is estimated at 1840 by James and Narcissa Merrit Johnston. They built it on land that belong to David Johnston. It served as a hospital and as a military headquarters. It was a hospital for a time during the 1864 and possibly 1865. The time it spent as a military headquarters was under the orders of General John B. Hood. The house is located at exactly 35.9964509 latitude, -86.8091668 longitude.
