= Brush Creek (Gasconade River tributary) =

Stream in the U.S. state of Missouri

Coordinates: 38°22′57″N 91°49′19″W

Brush Creek is a stream in Osage County in central Missouri. It is a tributary of the Gasconade River.

The stream headwaters are located at and the confluence with the Gasconade is at . The stream source arises adjacent to Missouri Route U and it flows southeast parallel to that road to cross under Route E just west of Rich Fountain. The stream turns east and follows just south of Route E to its confluence just south of the Missouri Route 89 bridge over the Gasconade.

Brush Creek was so named due to the abundance of brush near its course.

== See also ==
- List of rivers of Missouri
