= Tiffany Springs, Kansas City, Missouri =

Tiffany Springs
- Neighborhood
- Nickname: Artesian Springs
- Interactive map of Tiffany Springs
- Coordinates: 39.261°N 94.696°W
- Country: United States
- State: Missouri
- County: Platte
- City: Kansas City
- Established: 1981; 45 years ago
- Founded by: Flavel B. Tiffany
- Elevation: 1,090 ft (330 m)

Tiffany Springs is a neighborhood of Kansas City, Missouri, United States. It was founded by Flavel B. Tiffany in 1891 as Artesian Springs, intended to compete with Excelsior Springs, Missouri.

== History ==
Flavel B. Tiffany was one of the first and most prolific ophthalmologists of Kansas City. Aside from building his landmark home of Tiffany Castle, his major real estate endeavor was to build a spa resort to rival the successful Excelsior Springs, Missouri. In the late 1880s, he bought 1,100 acres (450 ha) in central Platte County which includes an Artesian aquifer. A post office called Artesian Springs operated from 1891 to 1895. The town was renamed to Tiffany Springs. His plans were not substantially realized, so the city of Kansas City eventually annexed most of this land, much of which became the Kansas City International Airport.

== Features ==
Tiffany Springs is now a neighborhood of Kansas City. The Springs Aquatic Center is a water park there that opened in May 2006 at 9400 North Congress Avenue off Interstate 29. The facility is operated jointly by Kansas City Parks and Recreation and Platte County Parks.
