= Pendleton Heights, Kansas City =

Neighborhood of Kansas City, Missouri

Pendleton Heights
- Historic neighborhood
- Location in Missouri
- Coordinates: 39°06′36″N 94°33′16″W
- Country: United States
- State: Missouri
- County: Jackson
- City: Kansas City
- Website: phkc.org

Pendleton Heights is a historic neighborhood in Kansas City, Missouri, United States. It is near the downtown highway loop, between Paseo and Chestnut Trafficway to the west and east, and Independence Avenue and Cliff Drive to the south and north.

As a historic district of Kansas City, Pendleton Heights is the second oldest specifically residentially-designed neighborhood, after Quality Hill. It is Kansas City's first developed suburb, platted in the late nineteenth century from what had been the 200-acre (0.81 km^{2}) Jones Farm.

The neighborhood has three city parks (North Terrace Park, Independence Plaza Park, and Maple Park), the original city reservoir, one of the two nationally listed urban scenic byways, and the largest number of true Victorian homes in the city. Architectural styles include "Traditional Victorian", American Craftsman, American Foursquare, Italianate, Eastlake, Shingle-Style, Richardsonian Romanesque, "Folk Victorian", "Kansas City Shirtwaist", Beaux Arts, and grand Queen Anne. Tiffany Castle is a 1909 landmark home on the bluffs overlooking the East Bottoms and the Missouri River below. The Philip E. Chappell house at 1836 Pendleton Avenue entered the National Register of Historic Places in 1990.

The Pendleton Heights Community Garden was launched in early 2013. This project is in partnership with PHNA, Kansas City Community Gardens, and MU Extension. Residents can lease plots for personal gardening or can work in community plots in exchange for a share of the harvest. In 2013, PHNA and KC Parks & Recreation planned an orchard on the vacant lot at Lexington and Montgall, to provide fresh fruit and nuts. The selected tree varieties have been grown in Northeast Kansas City since 1860, including peach, apple, fig, pecan, pawpaw, and serviceberry. Jerusalem Farm is a Catholic intentional community, offering weekly residential curbside composting.

Schools include Scuola Vita Nuova Charter School, Garfield Elementary School, and Kansas City University of Medicine and Biosciences.

The annual Holiday Homes Tour and Artist Market is on the first Saturday of December. Select Victorian homes decorated for the holiday season are open for tour, and neighborhood artist booths have items for sale.

In 2013, Pendleton Heights was featured by This Old House as one of the "Best Old House Neighborhoods in the US".

== See also ==
- List of neighborhoods in Kansas City, Missouri
