= Brush Creek (Sac River tributary) =

Stream in the American state of Missouri

Coordinates: 37°53′11″N 93°44′36″W

Brush Creek is a stream in Polk and St. Clair counties of southwest Missouri. It is a tributary of the Sac River.

The stream headwaters are in northwest Polk County at and the confluence with the Sac in St. Clair County is at .

Brush Creek was so named on account of brush near its course.

== See also ==
- List of rivers of Missouri
