= Henry F. Hoit =

American architect

Henry Ford Hoit FAIA
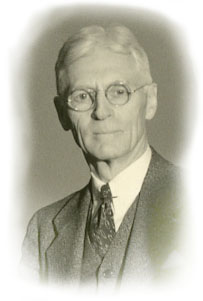
- Born: August 4, 1872; Chicago, Illinois
- Died: May 30, 1951 (aged 78); Kansas City, Missouri
- Education: Massachusetts Institute of Technology
- Occupation: Architect
- Spouse: Florence Eleanor Stinchfield (m. 1900)
- Practice: Hoit, Price and Barnes
- Buildings: Kansas City Power and Light Building; Corinthian Hall; Kansas City Athletic Club; Bell Telephone Building; Fidelity National Bank & Trust Building

Henry Ford Hoit (4 August 1872 – 30 May 1951) was a well-known Kansas City, Missouri, architect in the early 20th century. He and his partners designed many of Kansas City's most iconic commercial and residential buildings including the Kansas City Power and Light Building and the R.A. Long residence.

== Professional life ==
Henry Ford Hoit was born in Chicago, Illinois, on August 4, 1872. He graduated from the Chicago Manual Training School in 1892. Hoit went on to complete a special course in architecture at the Massachusetts Institute of Technology, graduating in 1898. While there, he became a member of the Delta Kappa Epsilon fraternity. In 1887 he was presented an award from the Boston Society of Architects for the best work in the field.

Hoit worked for various firms in Boston until 1901 when he received a letter from a fraternity brother, William H. Cutler. Cutler was a draftsman at the Kansas City firm of Van Brunt & Howe. The letter stated:

We are covered up with work here and now have the chance at another job that is too big to turn down; I speak of one of the main buildings to be put up for the World's Fair in St. Louis. We need a man who can take full charge of the men and design on this job. Would you consider the job?

Hoit accepted and went to Kansas City to make his fortune. The building that Hoit was asked to design was the Palace of Varied Industries at the Louisiana Purchase Exposition. The building covered about 14.5 acres of the exposition which took place on what is now Forest Park and Washington University in St. Louis. By the time the fair opened, Henry Van Brunt had retired and returned to Massachusetts. Frank M. Howe took on Hoit and Cutler as partners, forming Howe, Hoit & Cutler. Cutler died in 1907 and Howe died in 1909. The firm operated under Hoit's name until he partnered with Edwin M. Price and Alfred E. Barnes to establish Hoit, Price and Barnes on January 1, 1919.

Apparently his work made quite an impression on lumber magnate Robert A. Long of the Long-Bell Lumber Company. Long hired Howe, Hoit & Cutler to design the Independence Boulevard Christian Church that opened in 1905 and the R.A. Long Building which opened in 1907. Hoit went on to design Long's personal residence, Corinthian Hall which is now the Kansas City Museum. He also designed Longview Farm. These opened in 1908 and 1914.

Long wasn't the only tycoon impressed with Hoit. He designed both commercial buildings and personal residences for many wealthy Kansas Citians including Mack. B. Nelson, J. W. Perry, C. C. Peters, C. A. Braley, and Robert Keith. He also designed the Cosden Building in Tulsa, Oklahoma, as well as residences for Tulsa oil barons J. S. Cosden and J. H. Markham.

While Hoit had been designing skyscrapers since he did the 16 story R.A. Long Building in 1907, he really "made it big" when his firm designed the original 14 stories of the Southwestern Bell Telephone Building. That's because Hoit, Price & Barnes (HPB) also designed the additional 14 stories in 1929, making the 28-story building the tallest in Kansas City. Meanwhile, HPB designed the Kansas City Athletic Club Building (22 stories) in 1923, and floors 8-15 of the Dierks Building in 1926. Then in 1931, HPB not only designed the 32-story Fidelity National Bank Building but they also designed the 34-story Kansas City Power and Light Building. That was the tallest building in the state of Missouri until 1976.

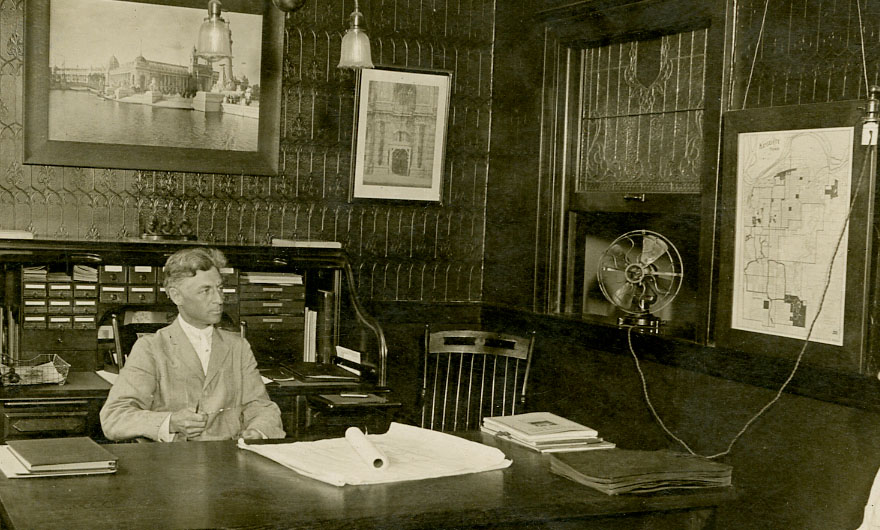
Henry F. Hoit at his desk, July 23, 1913. (Note: The picture hanging behind him is of the Palace of Varied Industries at the Louisiana Purchase Exposition (1904 St. Louis World's Fair). Hoit designed the building while employed at the firm of Van Brunt & Howe. — Folder 6; Alfred Edward Barnes (1892–1960) Architectural Records (K0004); The State Historical Society of Missouri Research Center-Kansas City.)

Hoit, Price & Barnes also designed the mechanical systems for Municipal Auditorium, a project that took several years to complete, opening in 1935. The firm continued on a variety of projects until Hoit retired and the firm was dissolved in 1941.

Hoit was also known for his community involvement. In 1907, he was a member of the board to review Kansas City building laws. He was a member of the board of appeals from 1908–1910. He was also a member of the board of the Thomas H. Swope settlement in 1910. In 1938, Hoit became a Fellow of the American Institute of Architects (FAIA), an honor that recognized his professional leadership and accomplishments.

There are many buildings on the National Register of Historic Places that were designed by Hoit and his partners. These include the Baker-Vawter Building, the Charles A. Braley House, Christian Church Hospital, the Continental Hotel, the Cosden Building, the O.H. Dean Building, the Fidelity National Bank & Trust Building, Independence Boulevard Christian Church, the Kansas City Power and Light Building, the R.A. Long Building and the R.A. Long Residence.

== Personal life ==
Hoit was the son of Chicago merchant Jeremiah Parsons and Elizabeth (Starrett) Hoit. His family descended from John Hoyt, an English settler of Salisbury, Massachusetts. While still in Boston, Hoit met Florence Eleanor Stinchfield, a mezzo-soprano who was studying music in Boston. She also studied under Luigi Vannuccini in Florence, Italy and in London as well. She was born on August 24, 1873, in Lewiston, Maine. Her parents were Oliver Dorrance and Lizzie R. (Symonds) Stinchfield. Oliver D. Stinchfield was a piano tuner as well as a self-described "musician, writer, artist, photographer, and humorist entertainer." They were married on Christmas Day in 1900. Shortly after arriving in Kansas City, the Hoit's had their only child, Imogene Elizabeth, born April 16, 1902.

With the success that he was achieving as a partner at Howe, Hoit & Cutler, Hoit decided to build a home in the Valentine Neighborhood of Kansas City. Contrary to the huge neoclassical mansions that Hoit was to design, his house was a 3,000-square-foot craftsman style home at 3771 Washington Street. It has brick on the first level and cedar shingle siding on the upper levels. It was completed in 1907. The Hoits moved to the Country Club District in 1930 to a 6-year-old house at 838 W. 58th Street.

Henry F. Hoit died on May 30, 1951, at the age of 78.

== Gallery ==
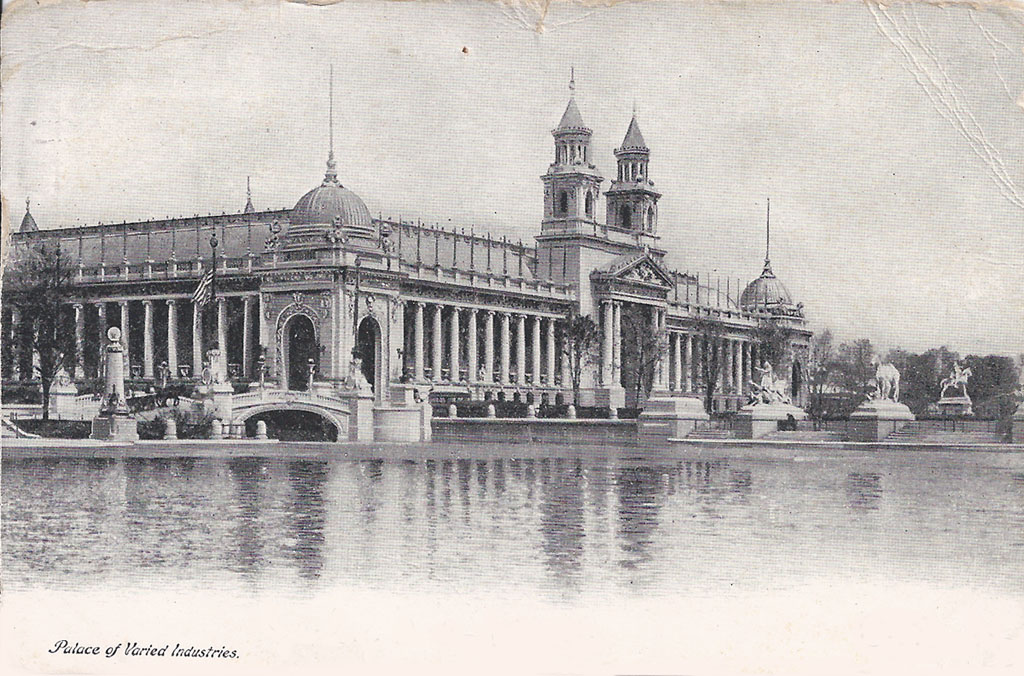
Palace of Varied Industries
1904 St. Louis World's Fair

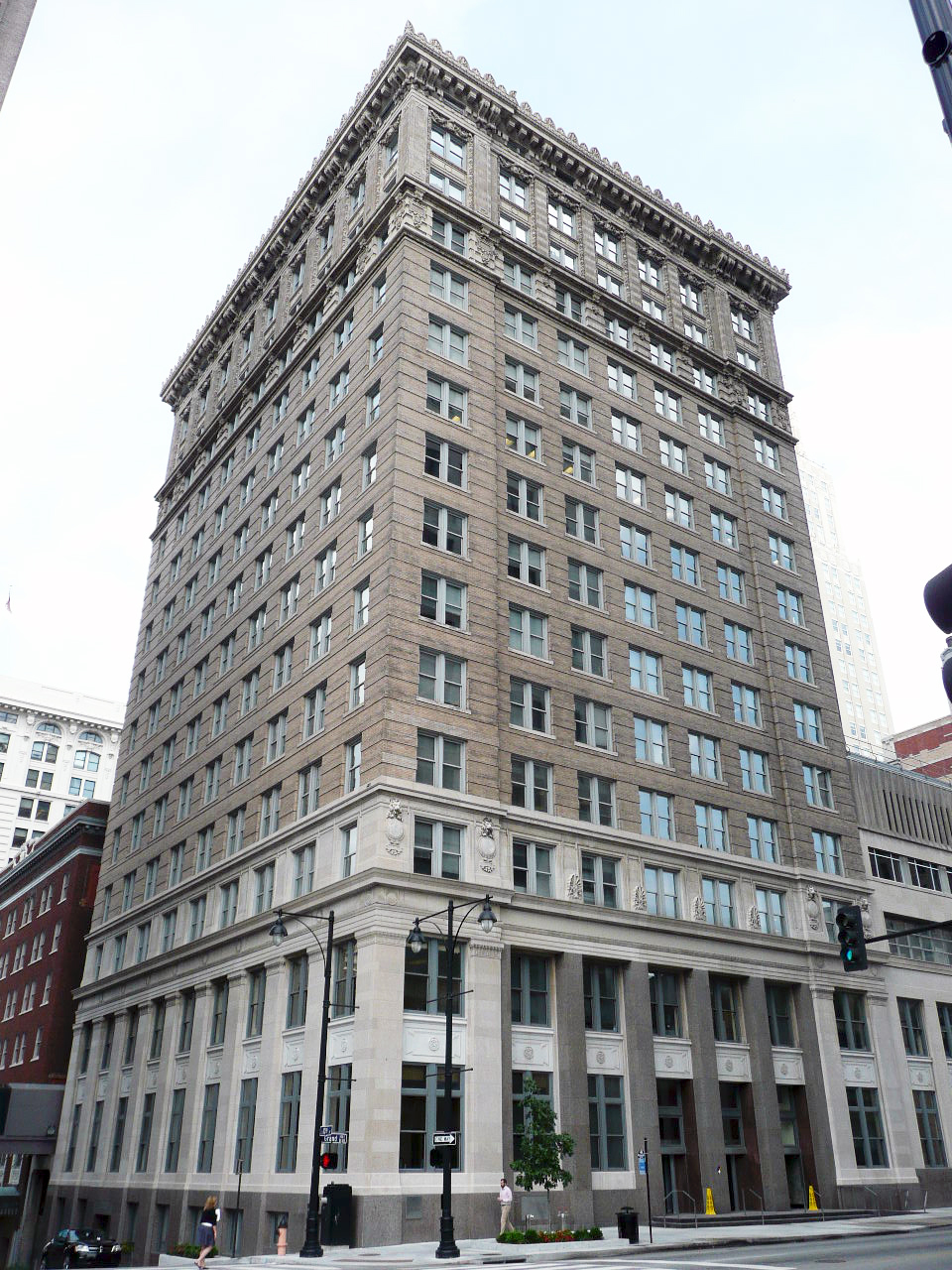
R.A. Long Building

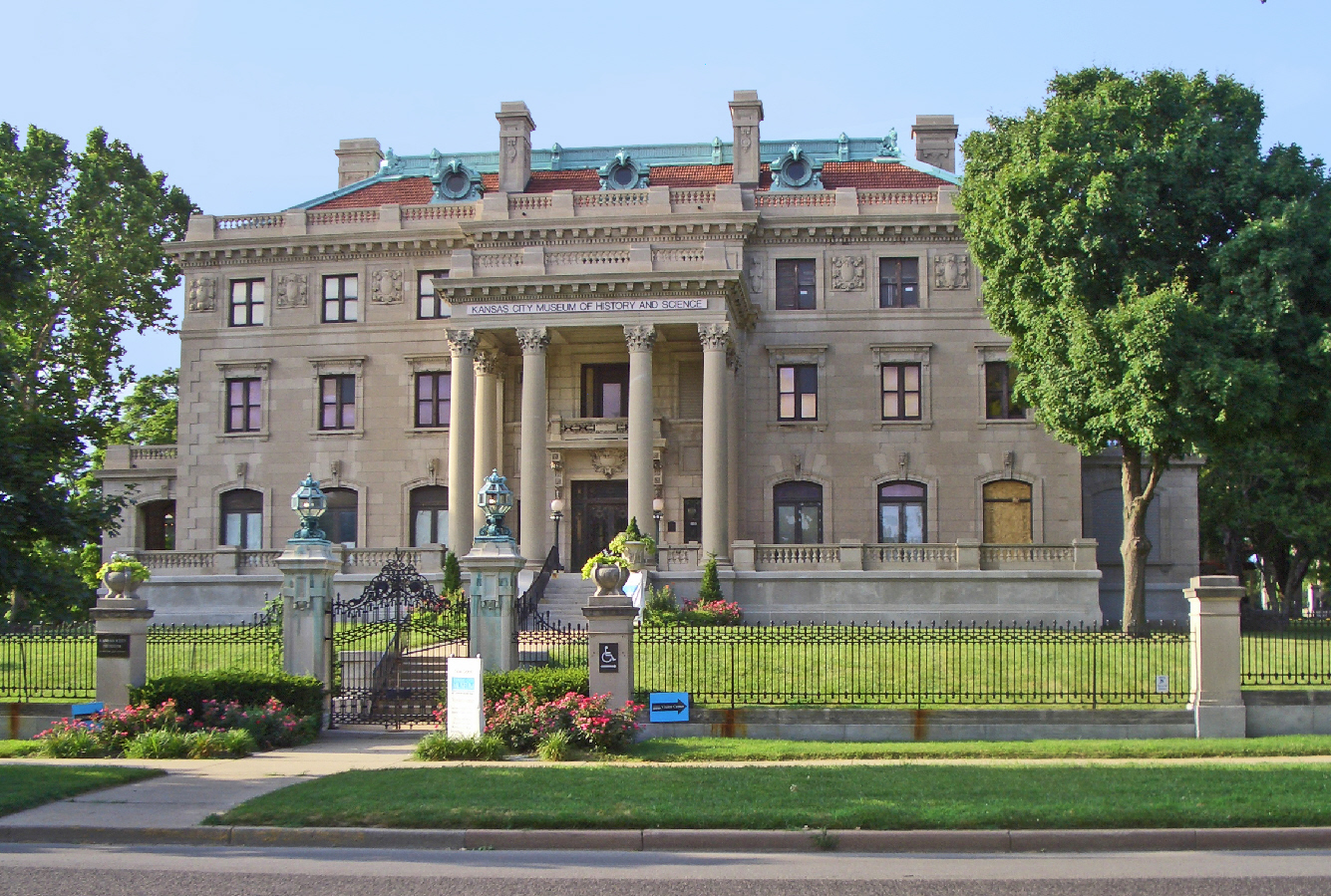
R.A. Long Residence (Corinthian Hall)

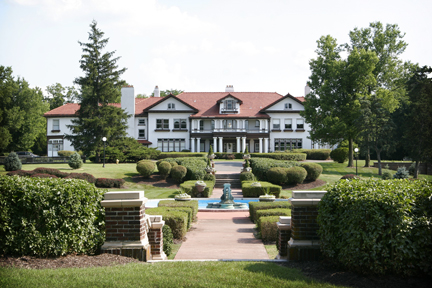
Longview Farm

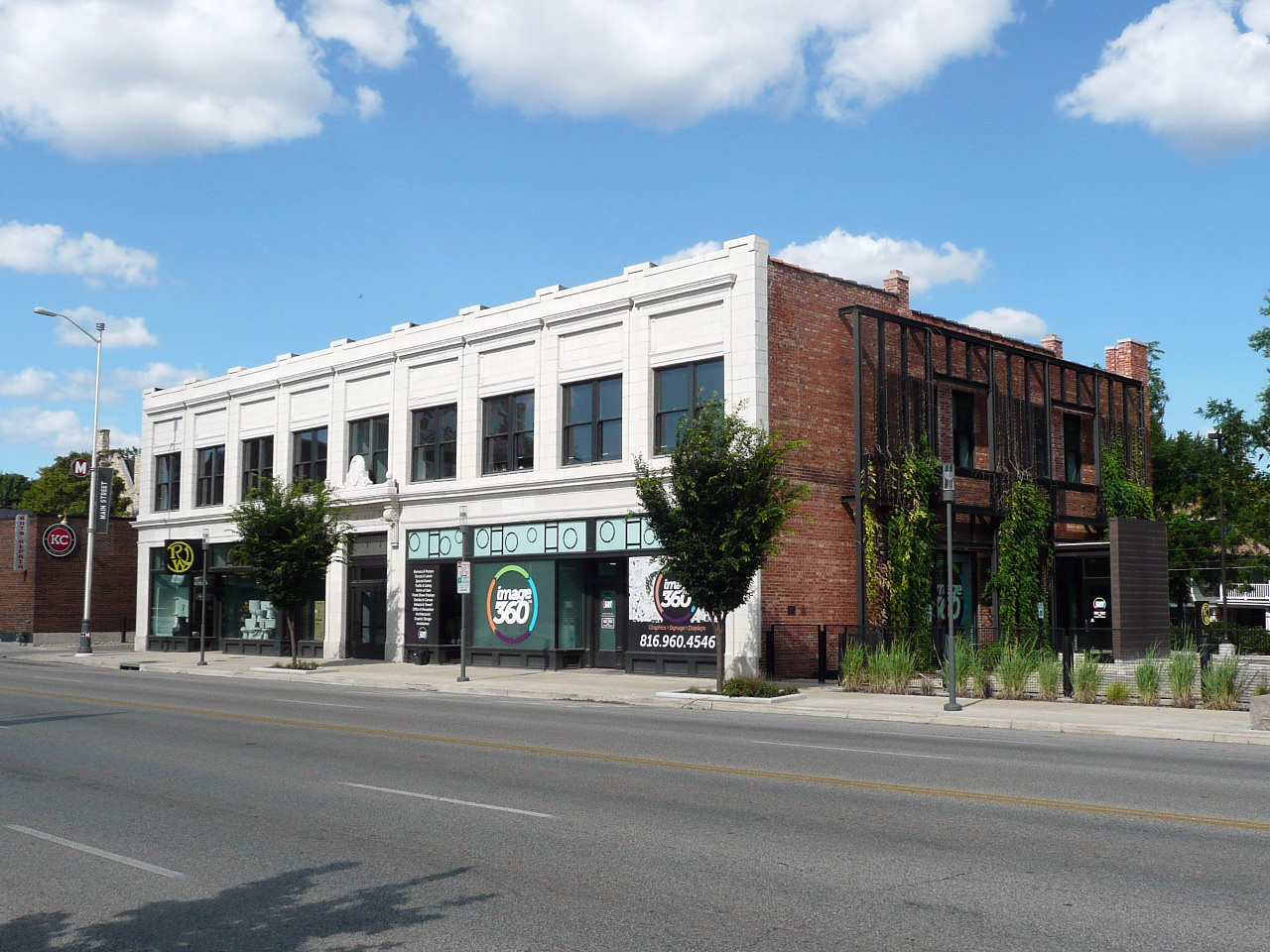
O. H. Dean Building

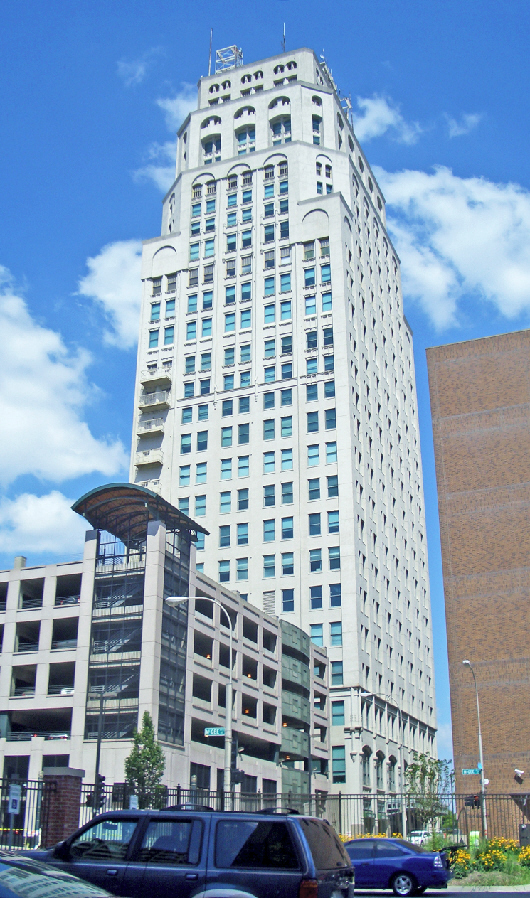
Bell Telephone Building

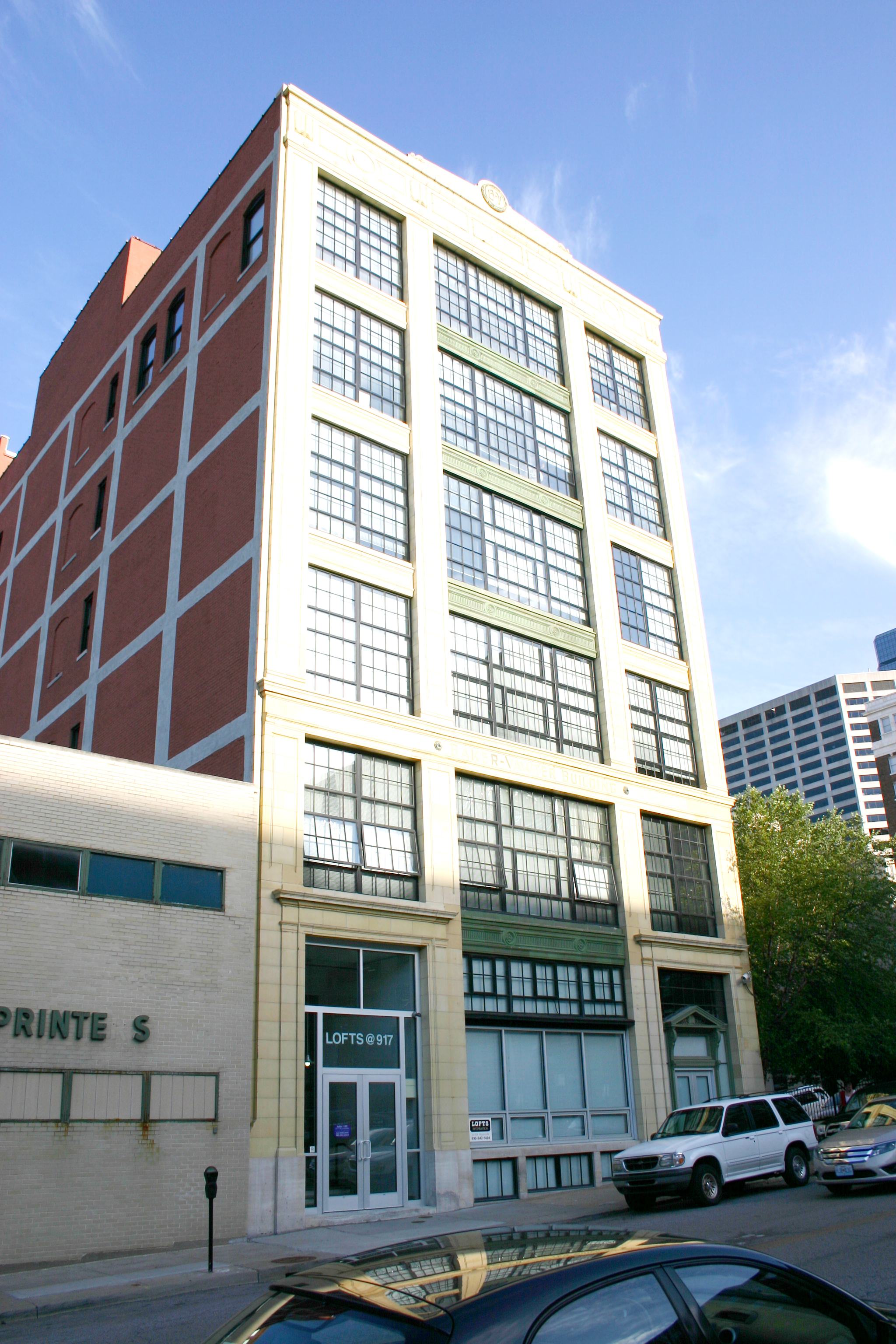
Baker-Vawter Building

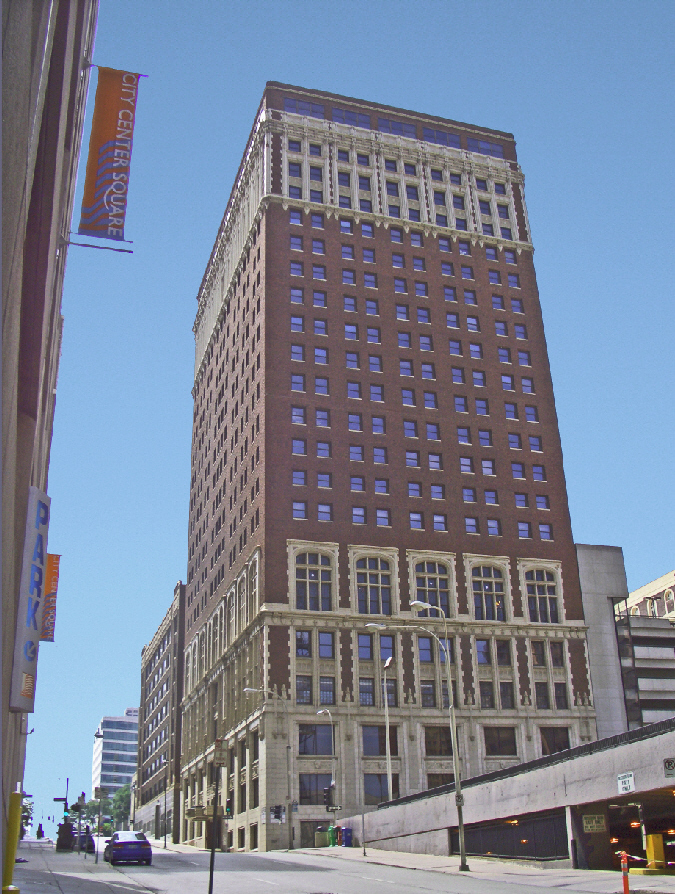
Kansas City Athletic Club

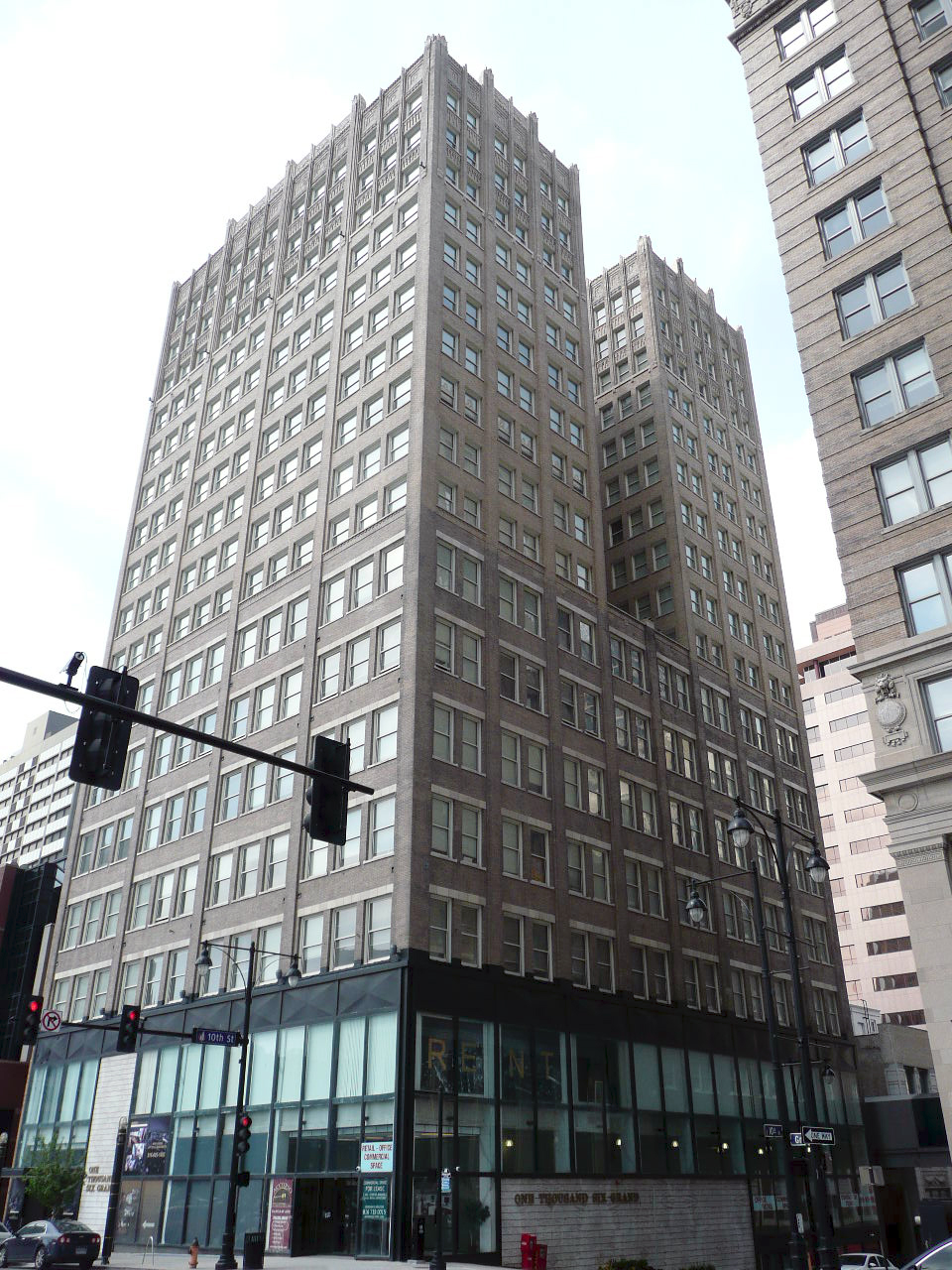
Dierks Building

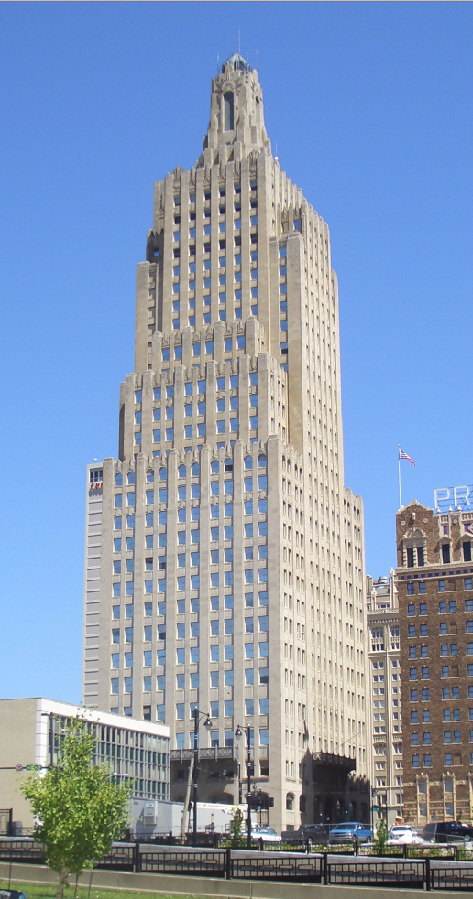
Kansas City Power & Light Building

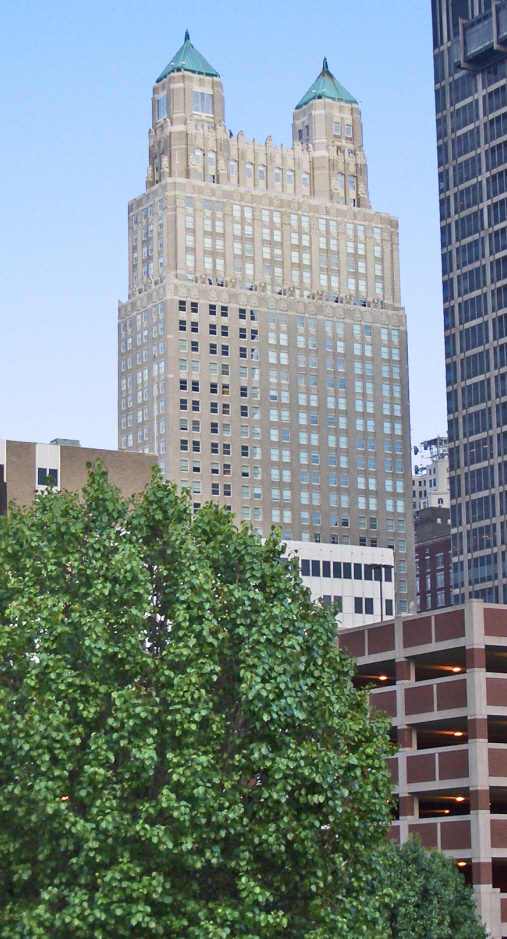
Fidelity National Bank

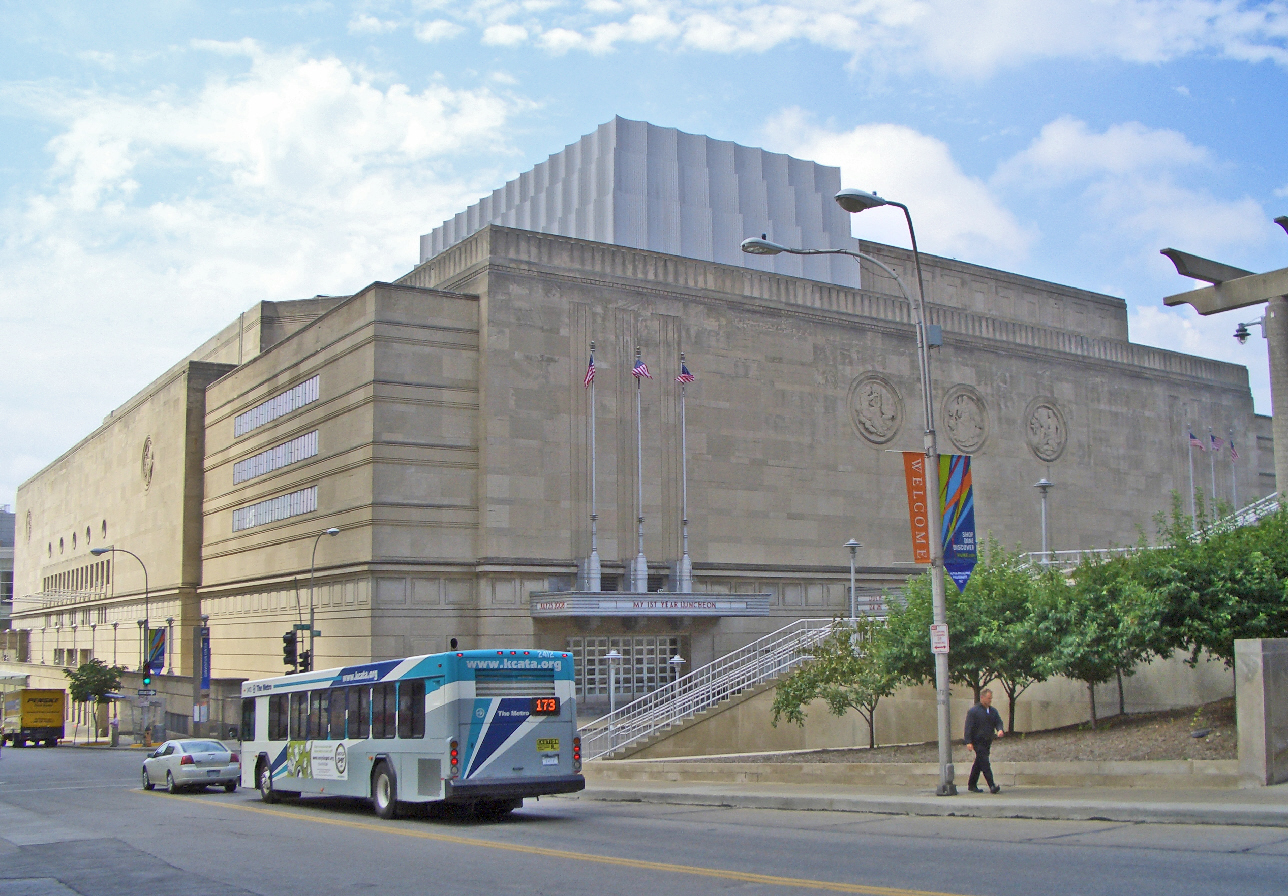
Municipal Auditorium
