= Municipal Auditorium (Kansas City, Missouri) =

Multi-purpose hall in Kansas City, Missouri, U.S.

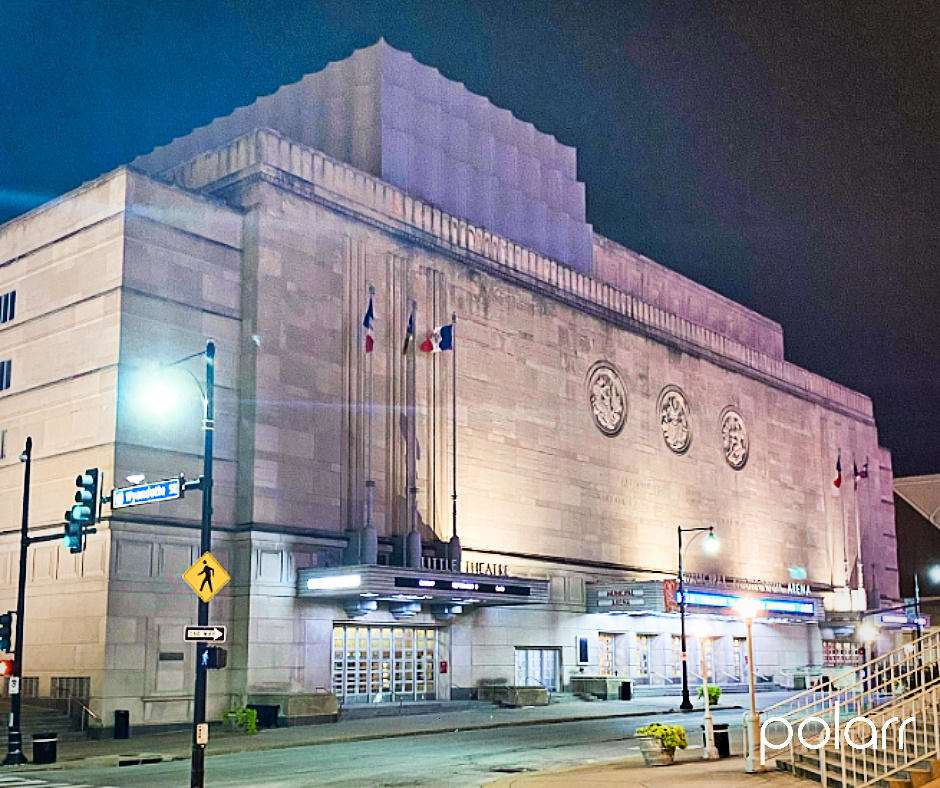
- Municipal Auditorium in 2020
- Interactive map of Municipal Auditorium
- Location: 301 West 13th Street, Kansas City, Missouri, U.S.
- Coordinates: 39°05′54″N 94°35′11″W
- Owner: City of Kansas City
- Operator: Kansas City, Missouri Convention and Entertainment Facilities
- Capacity: Arena: 7,300 permanent +2,687 temporary

Construction
- Opened: 1935
- Renovated: 2007, 2013
- Cost: $6.5 million ($153 million in 2025 dollars)
- Architects: Gentry, Voskamp & Neville; Hoit, Price & Barnes
- Builder: Swenson Construction Company

Municipal Auditorium is a multi-purpose facility located in Kansas City, Missouri. It opened in 1935 and features Streamline Moderne and Art Deco architecture and architectural details.

== Background ==
Municipal Auditorium was the first building built as part of the "Ten-Year Plan", a bond program that passed by a 4 to 1 margin in 1931. The campaign was run by the Civic Improvement Committee chaired by Conrad H. Mann. Other buildings in the plan included the Kansas City City Hall and the Kansas City branch of the Jackson County Courthouse. The plan was championed by most local politicians including Thomas Pendergast and provided Pendergast with many patronage opportunities during the Great Depression.

Municipal Auditorium replaced Convention Hall which was directly across the street and was torn down for parking to create what is now called the Barney Allis Plaza.

The streamline moderne architecture was designed by the lead architectural firm of Alonzo H. Gentry, Voskamp & Neville. Gentry later completed the design of the Harry S. Truman Presidential Library and Museum after the death of the original architect, Edward F. Neild. Homer F. Neville was the lead designer for Municipal Auditorium.

Hoit, Price & Barnes, the associated architects were responsible for the design of the mechanical work (HVAC, electrical, plumbing). William L. Cassell directed that design effort. Cassell went on to start his own firm in 1933 which is still in business as W. L. Cassell & Associates, Inc.

Henry F. McElroy, the choice of Tom Pendergast and other Democratic leaders to be City Manager, announced on January 5, 1932, that the architectural services for Municipal Auditorium would be divided between the firm of Gentry, Voskamp & Neville and the firm of Hoit, Price & Barnes. In addition, Gentry's firm would take the lead. The decision was controversial and led to lengthy contract negotiations. Gentry's firm was much smaller, while Hoit, Price & Barnes were known for their work in designing the Kansas City Power and Light Building, an Art Deco skyscraper completed in 1931; the 32-story Fidelity Bank Building at 909 Walnut; Corinthian Hall; and many more Kansas City buildings and residences. Municipal Auditorium, however, was a public project and Gentry, whose father had been a prominent Democratic politician in Independence, was the preference of the Pendergast machine. According to Neville, there was little interference with the building's design.

When the building opened in 1935, the Architectural Record called it "one of the 10 best buildings of the world that year". In 2000, the Princeton Architectural Press called it one of the 500 most important architectural works in the United States.

Municipal Auditorium is connected to the H. Roe Bartle Convention Center via skywalks over 14th and Central streets. An underground walkway through a public parking garage provides access to the Kansas City Marriott Downtown, and the Holiday Inn Aladdin Hotel.

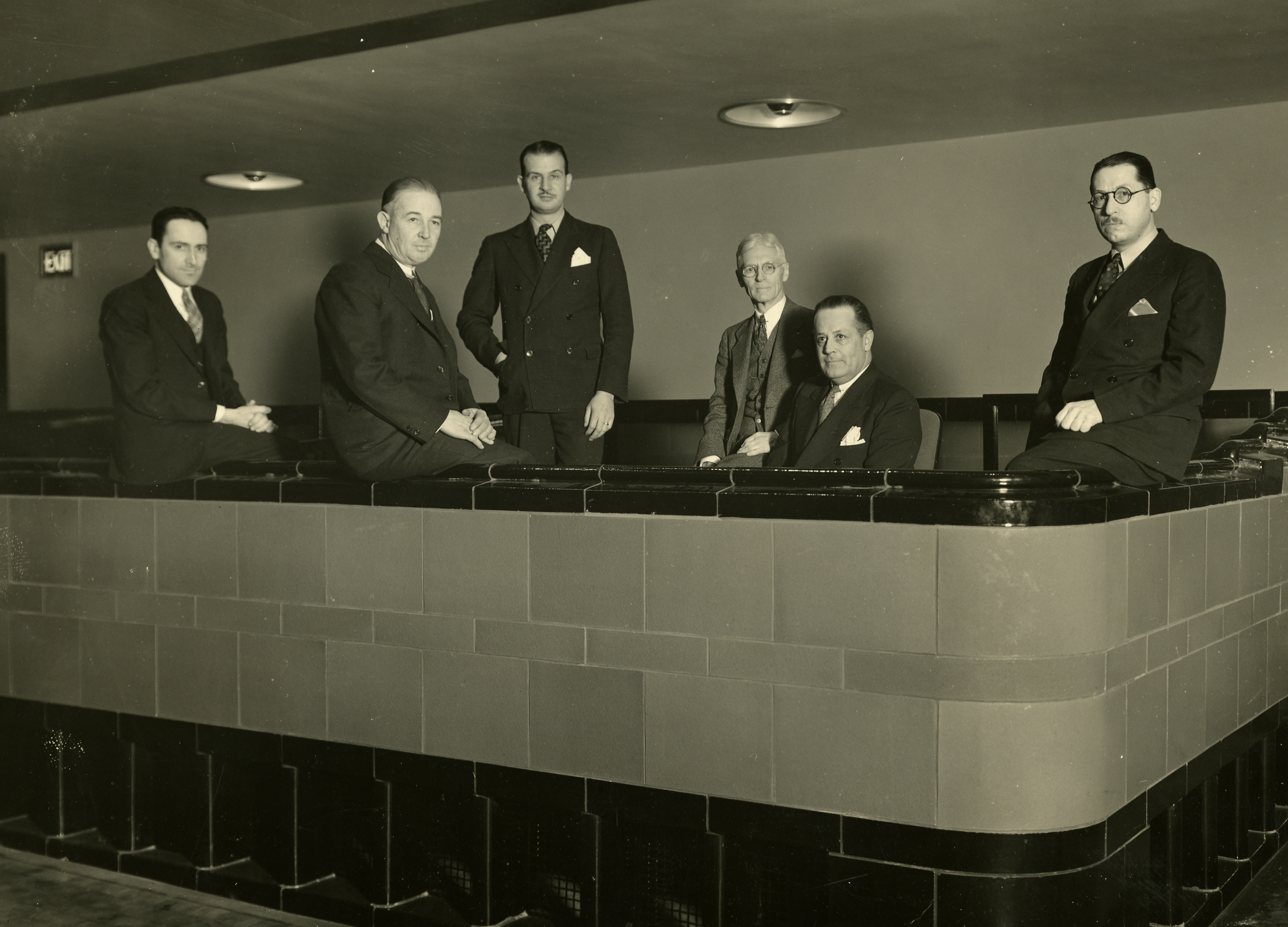
The architecture team for Kansas City's Municipal Auditorium. (L to R) William L. Cassell, Edwin M. Price, Homer F. Neville, Henry F. Hoit, Alonzo H. Gentry, Alfred E. Barnes. November, 1935. Folder 6; Alfred Edward Barnes (1892–1960)

== Arena ==
The Arena, nicknamed "Municipal", has hosted the Mid-America Intercollegiate Athletics Association tournament annually, each March since 2003. It is currently home to the NAIA Men's Division I Basketball National Tournament. It was played here from 1937 to 1974, when it moved into Kemper Arena, and has been home since the Tournament moved back to Kansas City from Tulsa in 2002.

The arena hosted three of the first four Final Fours, and hosted its last NCAA tournament game in 1964. In 2013, the University of Dayton Arena passed Municipal Auditorium in number of games hosted as that arena hosts the opening round games of the NCAA tournament. Municipal also hosted the Big 12 Women's Basketball Tournament 14 times from 1997 through 2023.

The 19,500-seat Kemper Arena was built in 1974 to accommodate Kansas City's professional basketball teams that had been playing at the Auditorium. The Kansas City Kings (known at the time as the Kansas City-Omaha Kings) played their first two seasons at the Auditorium, then returned for the majority of the 1979–80 season after the roof of Kemper Arena caved in on June 4, 1979.

On November 13, 1979, Darryl Dawkins of the Philadelphia 76ers completely shattered a backboard during a game vs. the Kings with a thunderous slam dunk.

Tommy Morrison vs. Donovan Ruddock was a professional boxing match that occurred on June 10, 1995 at the Municipal Auditorium. The fight had 8,000 spectators and was televised on pay-per-view.

It is home to the University of Missouri–Kansas City Kangaroos basketball team. Since January 2009, it has been the home of the Kansas City Roller Warriors roller derby league.

The 2013 $5 million renovation included new video boards, LED scorer's table, sound system, lighting, electrical upgrades, and lower-level seating.

== Music Hall ==
The Kansas City Music Hall is a large proscenium theatre with a striking Streamline Modern interior that seats an audience of 2,400 patrons. The hall presents touring Broadway shows, as well as visiting symphony orchestras, opera and ballet companies, and other events. It was the main hall of the Kansas City Philharmonic for several decades. It's also the home of the 1927 Robert-Morton Theatre Pipe Organ that originally was in the Midland Theatre. The organ is owned and maintained by Kansas City Theatre Pipe Organ, Inc.

== Little Theatre ==
The Little Theatre is an elegant octagonal ballroom with a capacity for 400, or banquet seating for 225 available for catered events, and a private balcony room for up to 36 guests.

== Gallery ==
An example of the Art Deco details found throughout Municipal Auditorium.

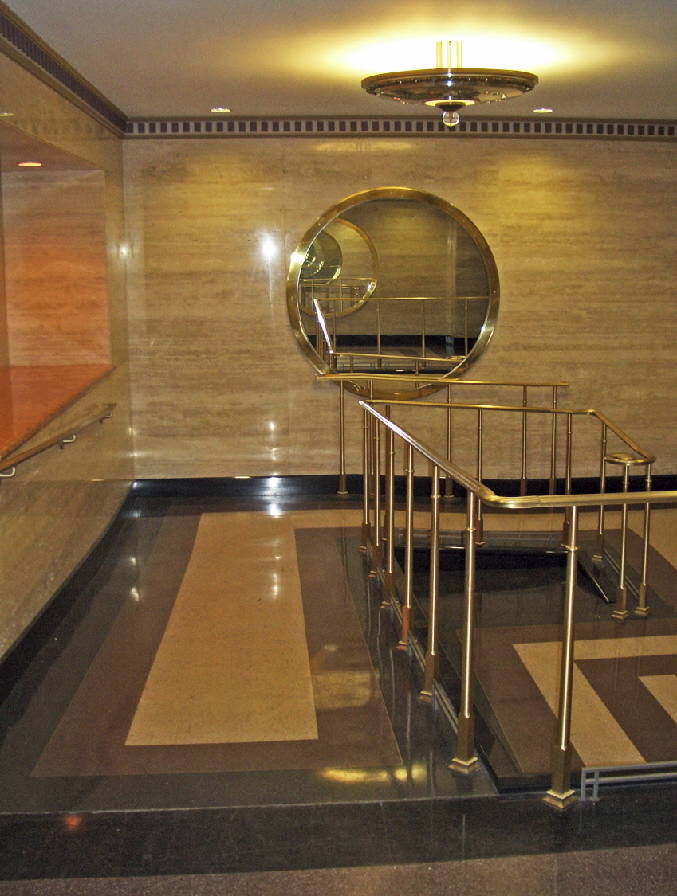
Foyer of
Little Theatre.

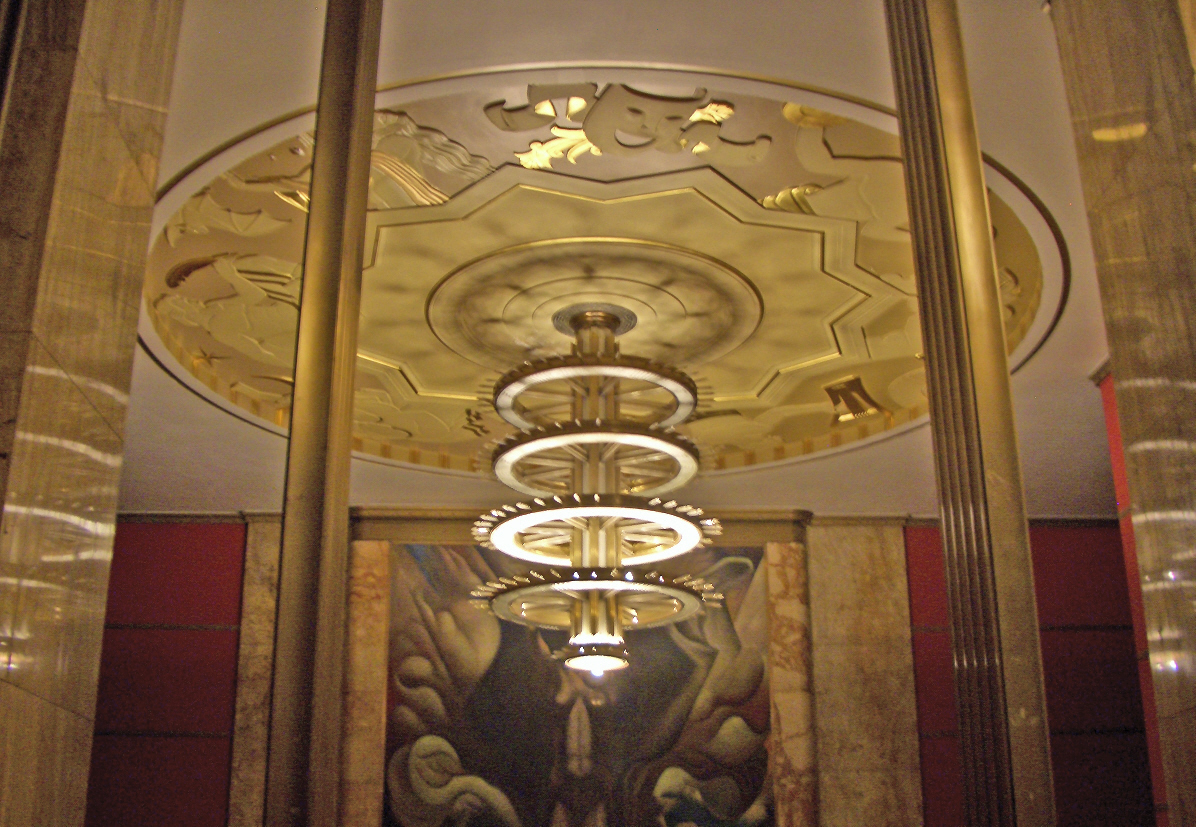
Art deco chandelier in Music Hall.

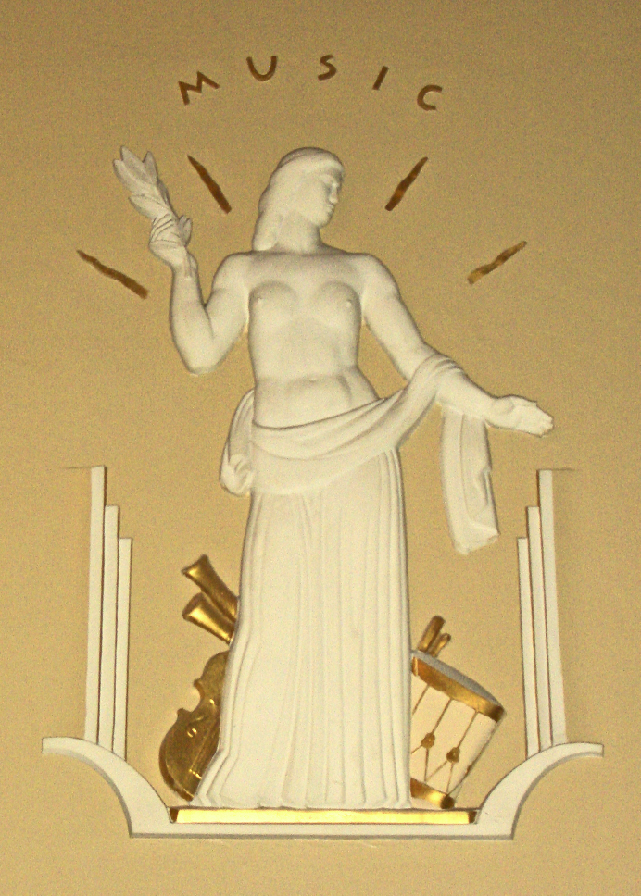
Wall decoration in
Little Theatre.

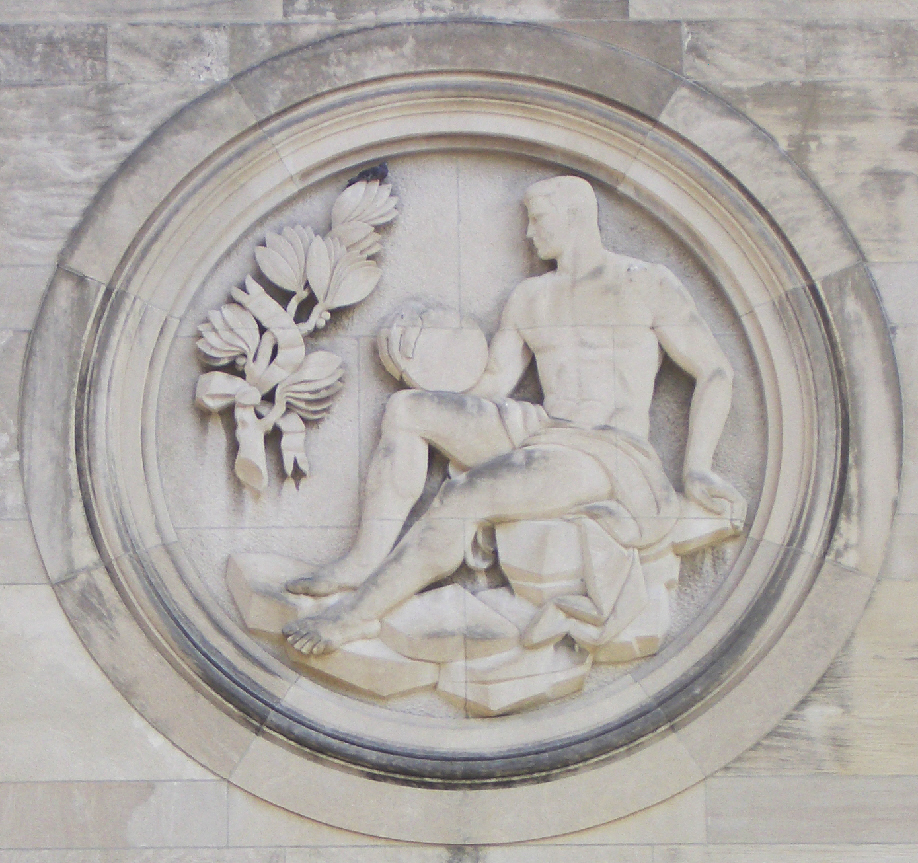
Monumental Art Deco medallion on the front of Municipal Auditorium.

== Sports succession history ==
Events and tenants
Preceded by none	Home of the Kansas City Goats; 2024	Succeeded by Current
Preceded by Reunion Arena; Cox Convention Center; Cox Convention Center; Chesapeake Energy Arena	Big 12 Conference Women's Basketball Tournament; 1997 – 2002; 2005; 2008; 2010 – 2012; 2021 – 2023	Succeeded by Reunion Arena; Reunion Arena; Cox Convention Center; American Airlines Center; T-Mobile Center
Preceded by Cincinnati Gardens	Home of the Kansas City-Omaha Kings (with Omaha Civic Auditorium); 1972 – 1974	Succeeded by Kemper Arena
Preceded by Patten Gymnasium; Hec Edmundson Pavilion; McGaw Hall; Cow Palace; Freedom Hall	NCAA Division I Men's; Basketball Tournament; Finals Venue; 1940 – 1942; 1953 – 1955; 1957; 1961; 1964	Succeeded by Madison Square Garden; McGaw Hall; Freedom Hall; Freedom Hall; Memorial Coliseum

== See also ==
- List of NCAA Division I basketball arenas
- NAIA men's basketball championship
