= Hoit, Price and Barnes =

Kansas City architectural firm

Hoit, Price & Barnes
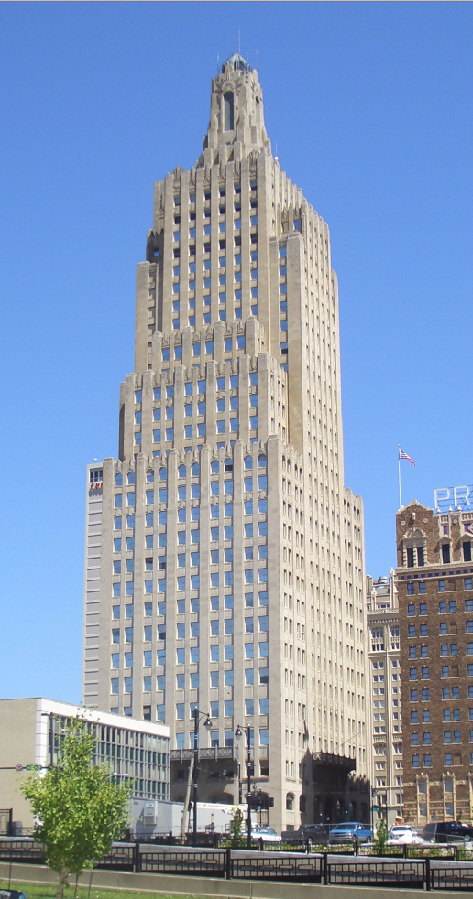
- Kansas City Power and Light Building

Practice information
- Key architects: William H. Ware, Henry Van Brunt, Frank M. Howe, William H. Cutler
- Partners: Henry F. Hoit, Edwin M. Price, Alfred E. Barnes
- Founded: 1919
- Dissolved: 1941
- Location: Kansas City, Missouri

Significant works and honors
- Buildings: Kansas City Power & Light, Corinthian Hall, 909 Walnut, Oak Tower, Municipal Auditorium
- Awards: Medal Awards for Excellence in Architectural Design, Architectural League of Kansas City; 1923 for the Kansas City Athletic Club; 1929 for the Bell Telephone Administration Building

Hoit, Price & Barnes was a prominent Kansas City architectural firm in the early 20th century. It designed several skyscrapers and mansions, including three of the current ten tallest buildings in Kansas City: the Kansas City Power and Light Building, 909 Walnut, and Oak Tower.

== History ==
The history of Hoit, Price & Barnes has its roots in Boston, where Harvard graduates William R. Ware and Henry Van Brunt established the firm of Ware & Van Brunt in 1864. Frank M. Howe joined the firm in 1868. When Ware became the founding chair of the School of Architecture at Columbia University in 1881, the firm became Van Brunt & Howe. They opened a branch office in Kansas City in 1887. Van Brunt died in 1903. In 1904, the Kansas City firm of Howe, Hoit & Cutler was established when Howe partnered with employees Henry F. Hoit and William H. Cutler, both graduates of the Massachusetts Institute of Technology (MIT).

In 1901, Van Brunt & Howe received the commission to design the Palace of Varied Industries building at the St. Louis World’s Fair. Cutler was the head draftsman and recommended that they hire Hoit to take charge of the job. Hoit was his former classmate at MIT and was living in Boston at the time. Soon after, Van Brunt retired, creating the firm of Howe, Hoit & Cutler. It became Howe & Hoit in 1907 when Cutler died of typhoid fever. Howe died in 1909.

Hoit was on his own until 1913, when he partnered with another MIT graduate, Edwin M. Price. Alfred E. Barnes joined the partnership on January 1, 1919, and the firm of Hoit, Price & Barnes was born.

R. A. Long, the wealthy lumber baron, was impressed with Hoit's work on the Varied Industries building. This began a long business relationship with Hoit and his partners designing the Independence Boulevard Christian Church, of which Long was a member; the R. A. Long Building, one of Kansas City’s first steel framed skyscrapers; Long’s home at Corinthian Hall which is now the Kansas City Museum; Longview Farm, his country estate; Christian Church Hospital; and even Long’s mausoleum. They also designed the Mack B. Nelson house when Nelson was Vice-President of the Long-Bell Lumber Company.

When the full 28 stories of the Bell Telephone Building were completed in 1929, it was the tallest building in Kansas City. Then the 34-story Kansas City Power and Light Building was completed in 1931, making it the tallest building in Missouri, a title it held until 1976.

The firm continued until 1941, when the construction industry began to change to meet the war effort.

== Notable buildings ==
=== Van Brunt & Howe ===
- 1887 - Frank M. Howe Residence (Designed by Howe)
- 1890 - Emery, Bird, Thayer Dry Goods Company Building
- 1904 - Palace of Varied Industries, Louisiana Purchase Exposition, St. Louis, Missouri (razed)

=== Howe, Hoit & Cutler ===
- 1905 - Independence Boulevard Christian Church
- 1907 - R.A. Long Building
- 1908 - Temple B'nai Jehudah (In 2003, became Mohart Multipurpose Center)

=== Henry F. Hoit ===
- 1908 - R.A. Long Residence (Kansas City Museum at Corinthian Hall)
- 1914 - Longview Farm
- 1914 - Mack B. Nelson House, 55th & Ward Parkway
- 1915 - Christian Church Hospital, 2697 W. Paseo Blvd.
- 1916 - C.C. Peters residence, 55th & State Line
- 1916 - O. H. Dean Building (Reeves-Wiedeman Company), 3635 Main Street
- 1918 - Cosden Building (Mid-Continent Tower) Tulsa, Oklahoma
- 1919 - Charles A. Braley house, 3 Dunford Circle
- 1920 - Bell Telephone Building (Oak Tower), original 14 stories

=== Hoit, Price & Barnes ===
- 1920 - Baker-Vawter Building
- 1923 - Kansas City Athletic Club (became Continental Hotel in 1932, Mark Twain Tower in 1982)
- 1926 - Dierks Building floors 8-15
- 1928 - Robert Keith Furniture Company Building, 13th & Baltimore
- 1929 - Bell Telephone Building (Oak Tower), additional 14 stories
- 1930 - Dierks Building floors 16-17
- 1931 - Kansas City Power and Light Building
- 1931 - Fidelity National Bank & Trust Building (909 Walnut)
- 1935 - Municipal Auditorium (mechanical work)

== Principals of the firm ==
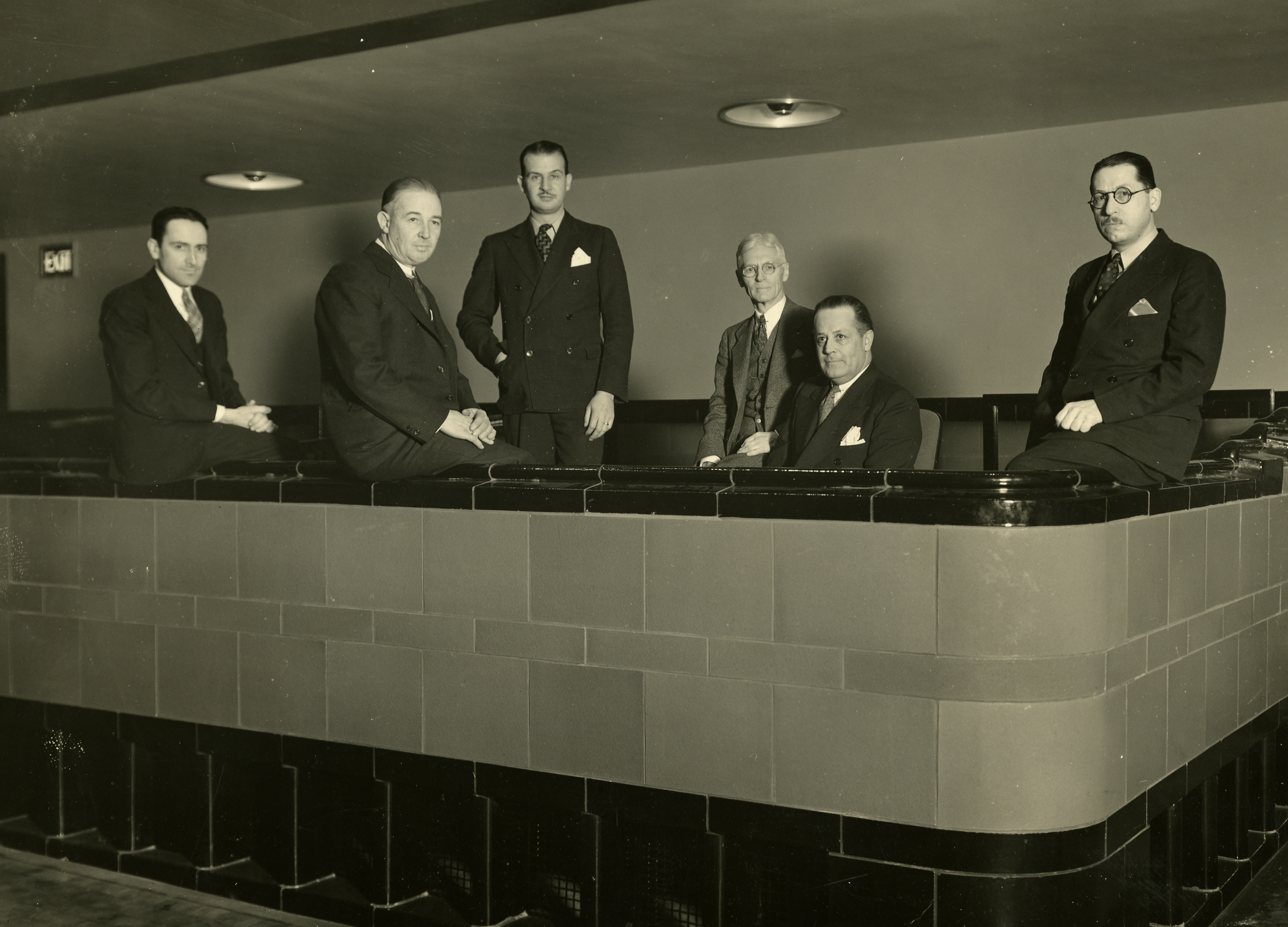
The architecture team for Kansas City's Municipal Auditorium. (L to R) William L. Cassell, Edwin M. Price, Homer F. Neville, Henry F. Hoit, Alonzo H. Gentry, Alfred E. Barnes. November, 1935. Folder 6; Alfred Edward Barnes (1892-1960) Architectural Records (K0004); The State Historical Society of Missouri Research Center-Kansas City. Photo taken by The Harkins Commercial Photo Co. Kansas City, MO.

- Henry F. Hoit (1873-1951) - a native of Chicago, Illinois, who moved to Kansas City in 1901
- Edwin M. Price (1884-1957) - a native of Webb City, Arkansas, who moved to Kansas City to work for Howe, Hoit & Cutler in 1905.
- Alfred E. Barnes (1892-1960) - a native of Kansas City, who became employed with Hoit in 1909. His grandfather was Kansas City architect Asa Beebe Cross.

== Buildings on the National Register of Historic Places ==
- Baker-Vawter Building, 915-917 Wyandotte, Kansas City (Listed May 5, 2000)
- Charles A. Braley House, 3 Dunford Cir., Kansas City (Listed October 9, 2013)
- Christian Church Hospital (aka Robinson Neurological Hospital), 2697 W. Paseo Blvd., Kansas City (Listed October 21, 2004)
- Continental Hotel (aka Kansas City Athletic Club, Mark Twain Tower), 106 W. 11th St., Kansas City (Listed August 8, 1983)
- Cosden Building (Mid-Continent Tower) 409 S. Boston, Tulsa, Oklahoma (Listed February 1, 1979)
- O.H. Dean Building, 3625-3635 Main St., Kansas City (Listed September 3, 2009)
- Dierks Building, 1000-1006 Grand Blvd., Kansas City (Listed January 29, 2009)
- Fidelity Nation Bank & Trust Building, 909 Walnut, Kansas City (Listed August 14, 1997)
- Frank M. Howe Residence, 1707 Jefferson St., Kansas City (Listed April 18, 1985)
- Independence Boulevard Christian Church, 606 Gladstone Blvd., Kansas City (Listed January 14, 2015)
- Kansas City Power and Light Building, 1330 Baltimore Ave., Kansas City (Listed January 9, 2002)
- R.A. Long Building, 928 Grand Blvd., Kansas City (Listed January 8, 2003)
- R.A. Long House (Kansas City Museum at Corinthian Hall), 3218 Gladstone Blvd., Kansas City (Listed November 14, 1980)

== Gallery ==
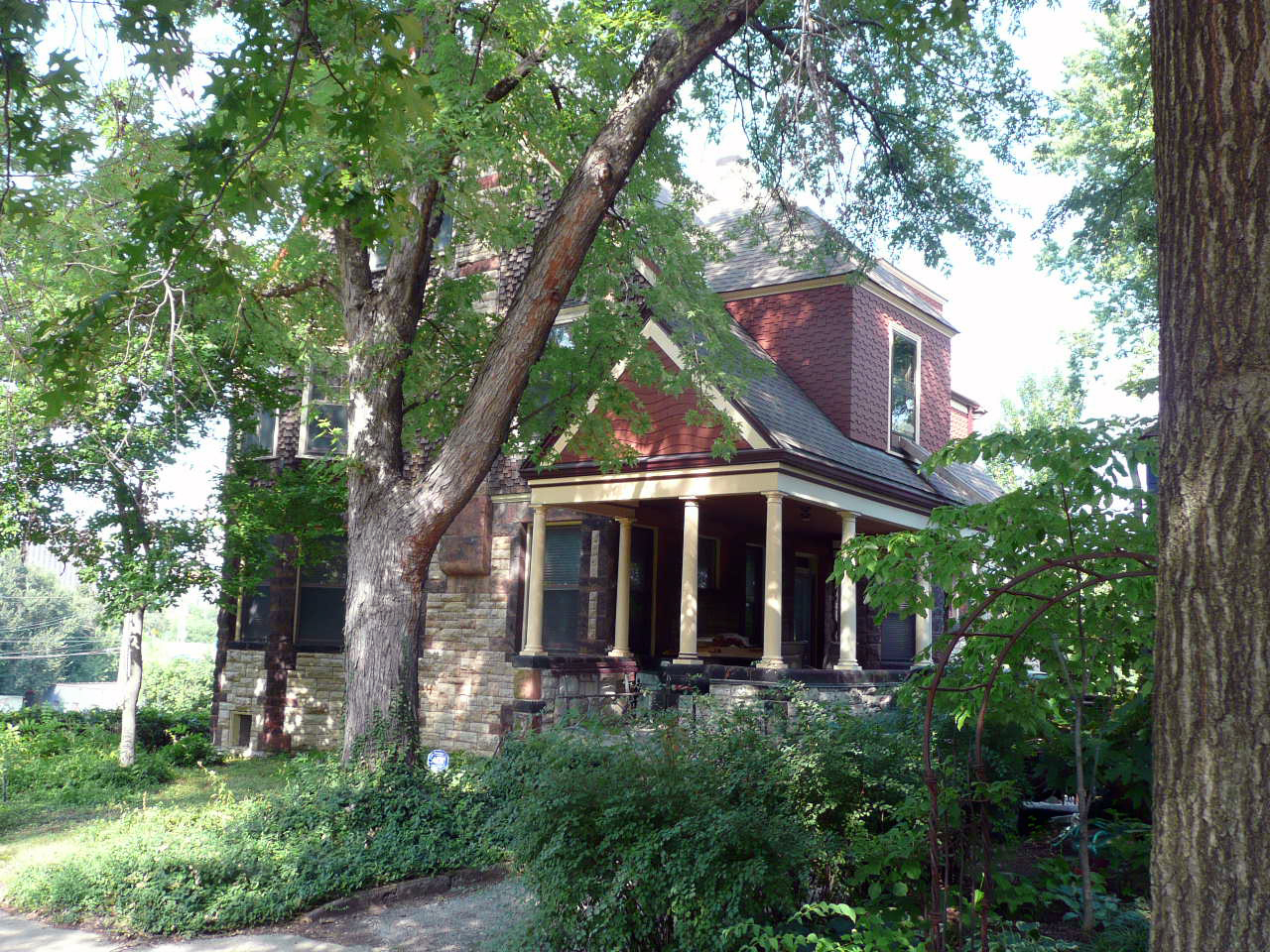
Frank M. Howe Residence

Emery, Bird & Thayer Building

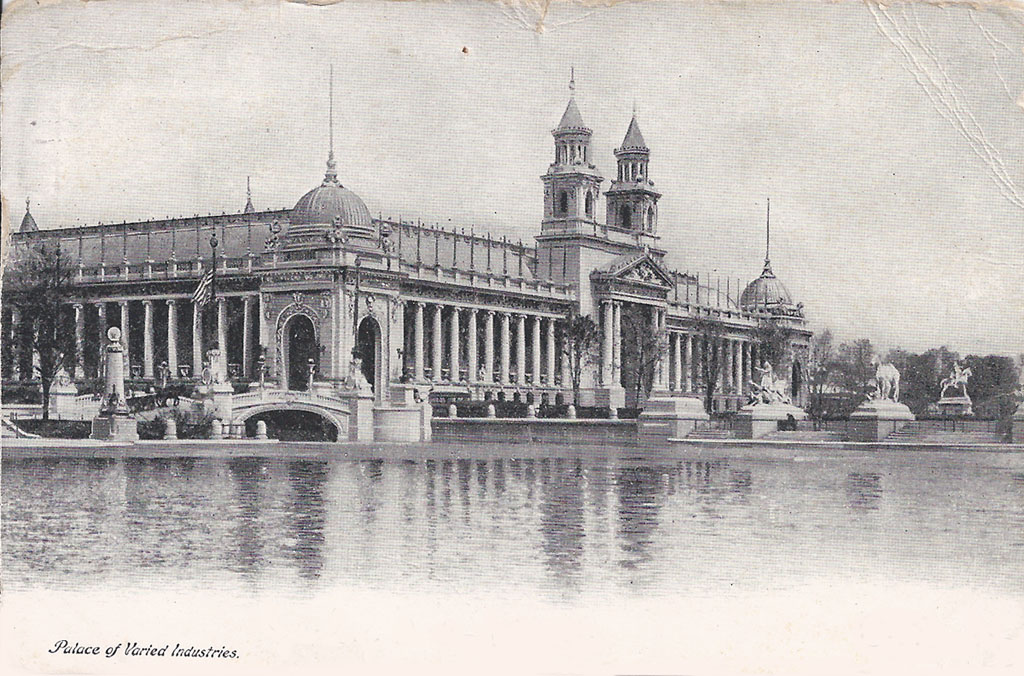
Palace of Varied Industries
1904 St.Louis World's Fair

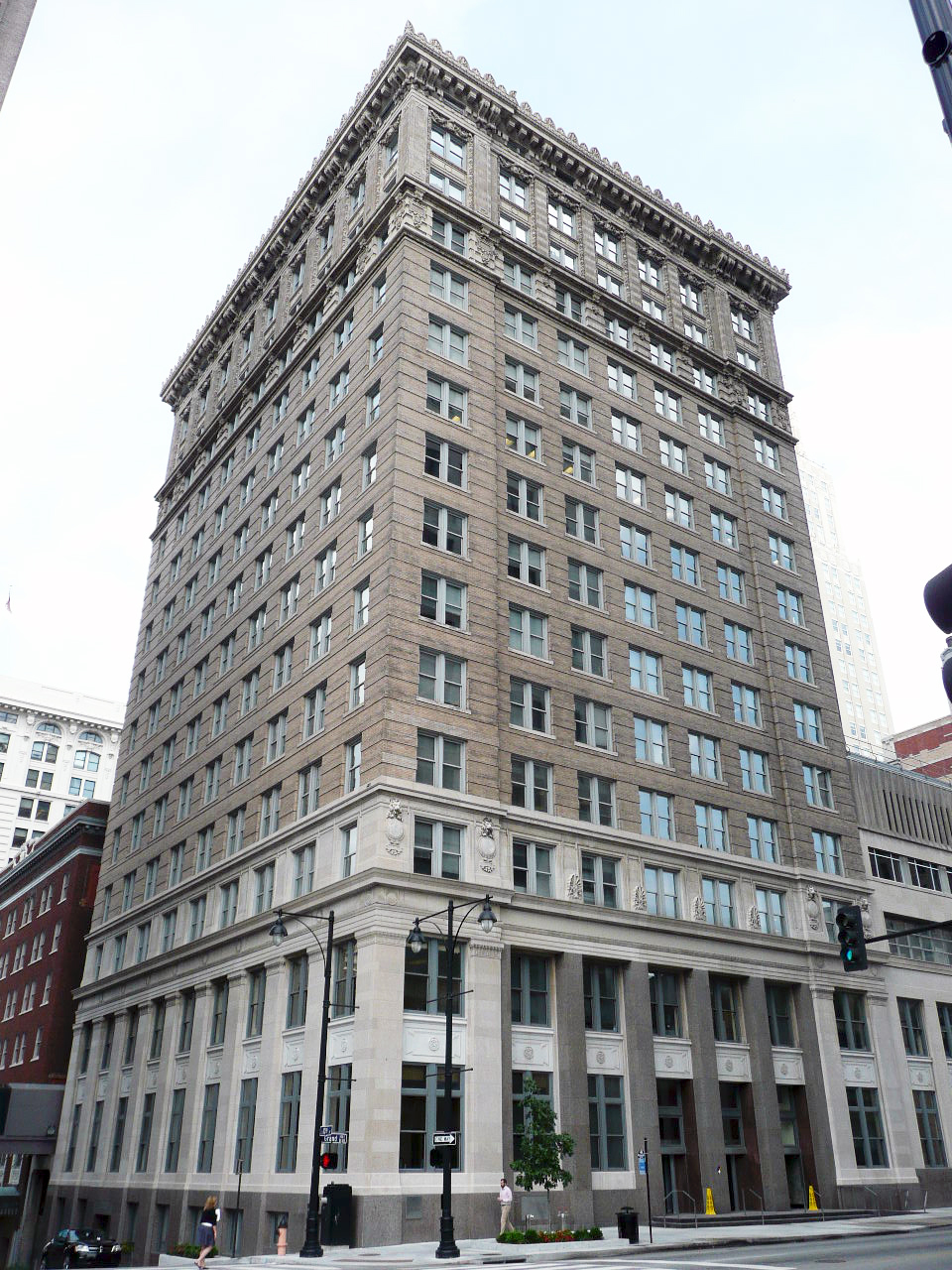
R.A. Long Building

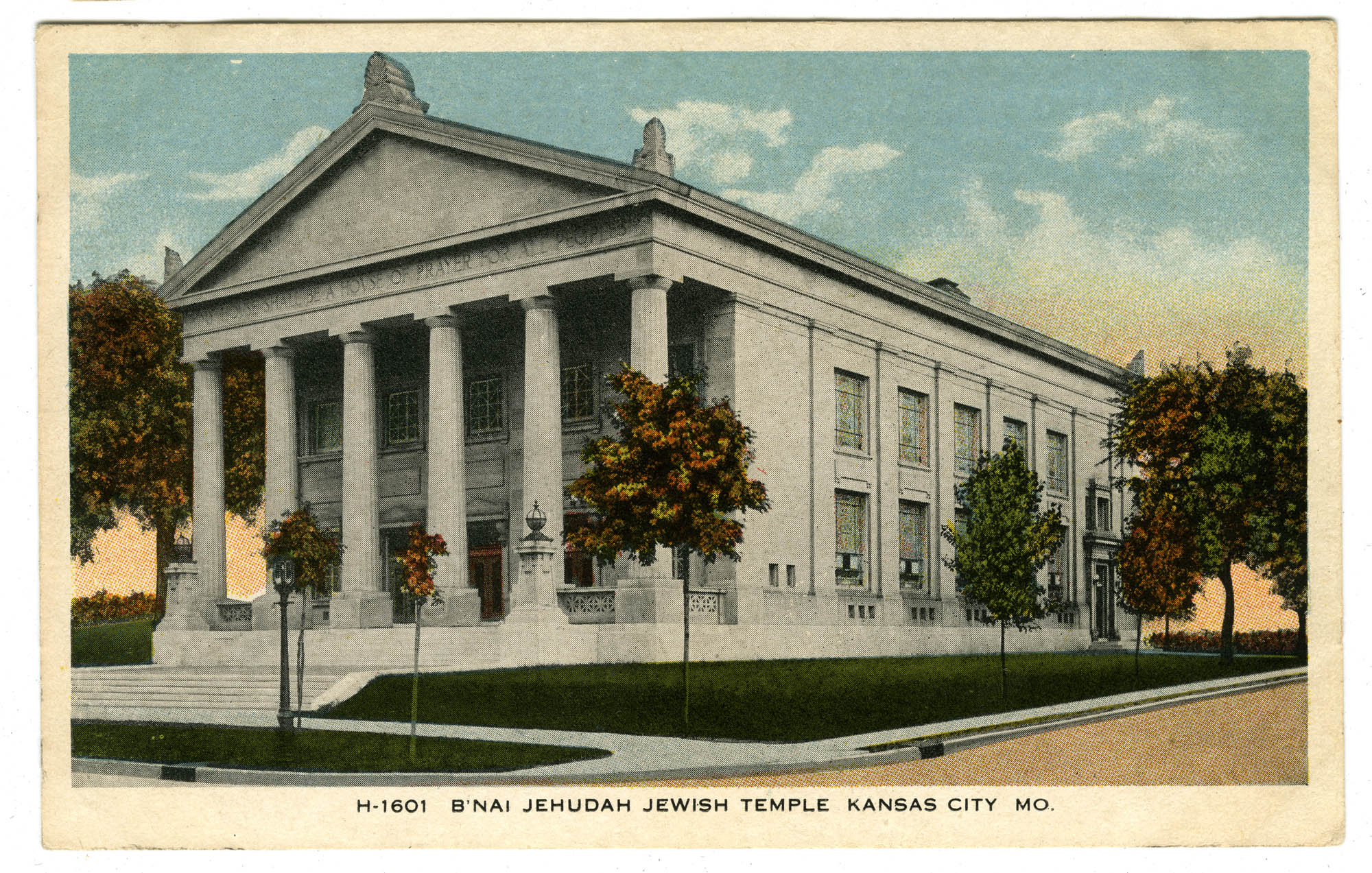
B'nai Jehudah Temple

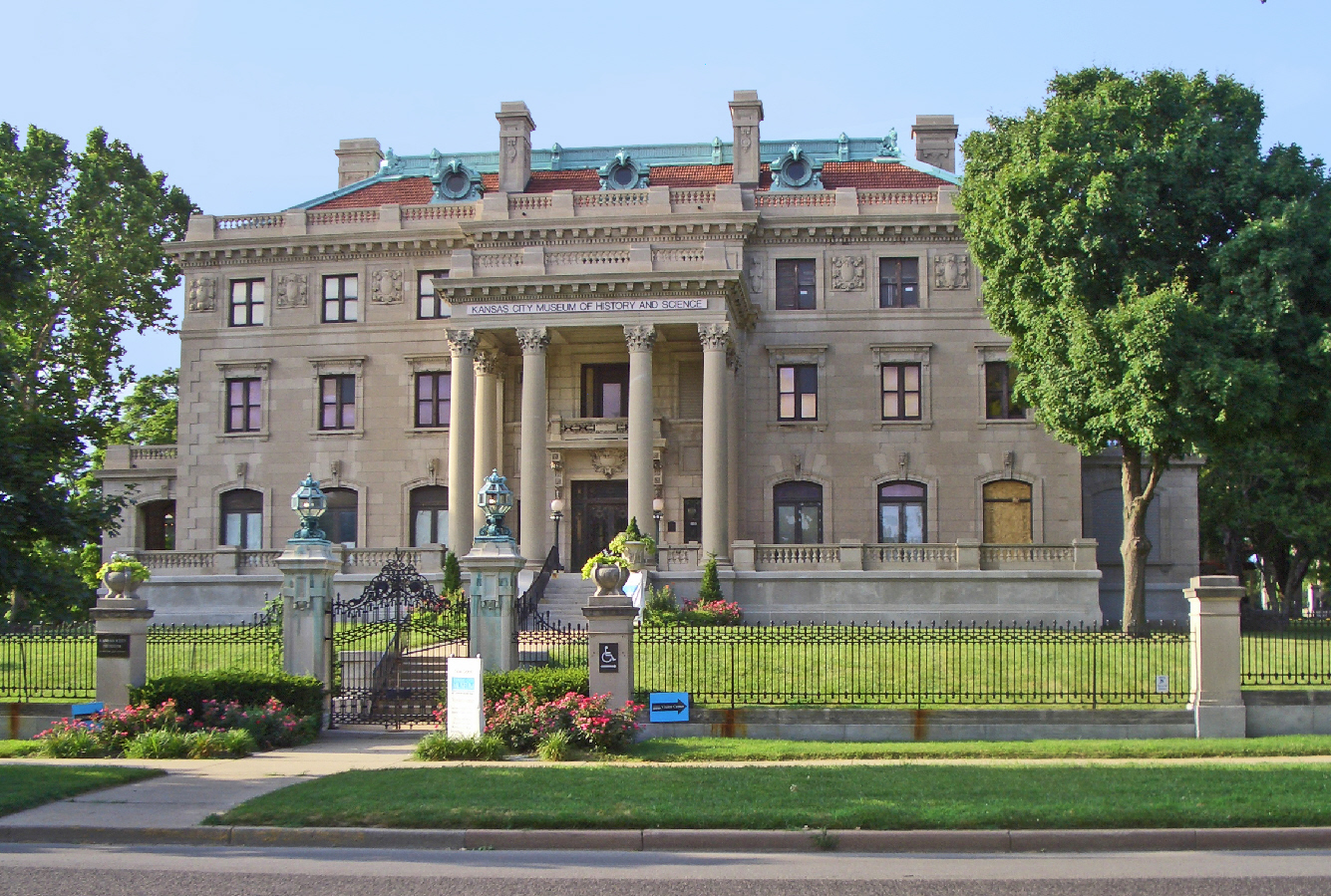
Kansas City Museum (R.A. Long Residence - Corinthian Hall)

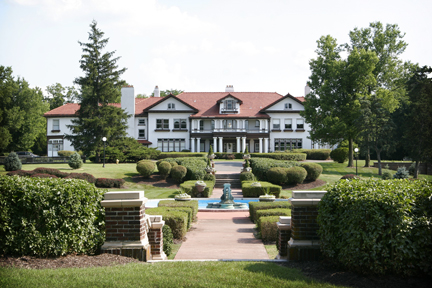
Longview Mansion at Longview Farm

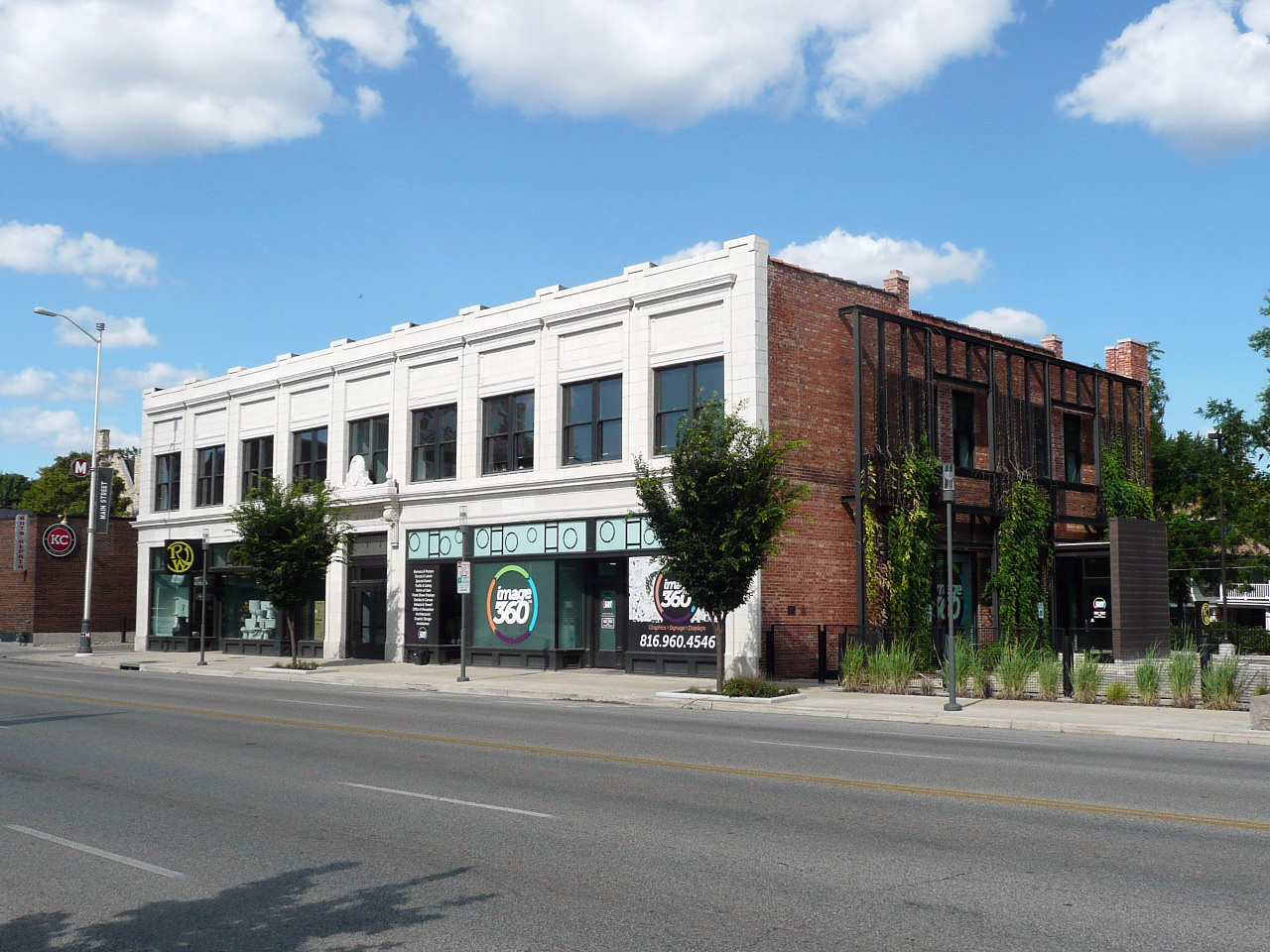
O. H. Dean Building

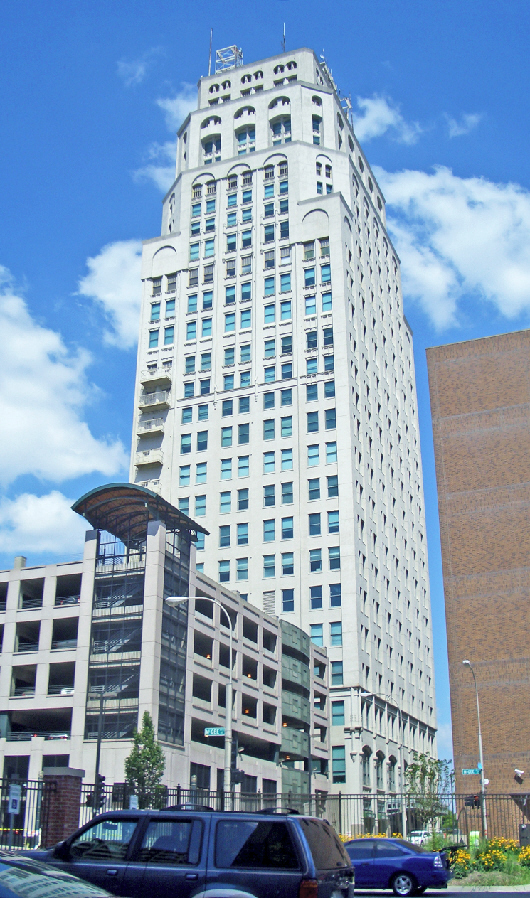
Oak Tower (Bell Telephone Building)

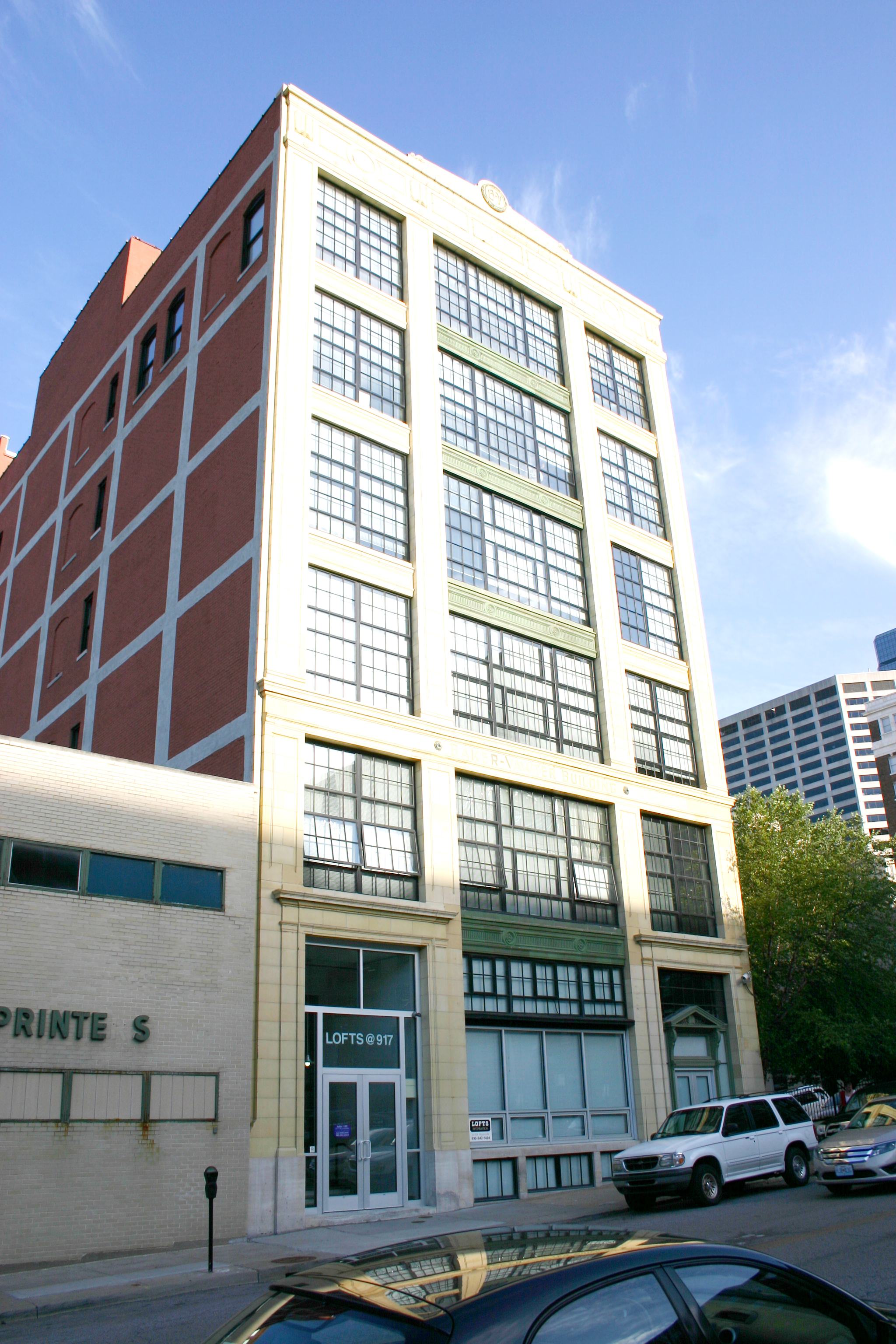
Baker-Vawter Building

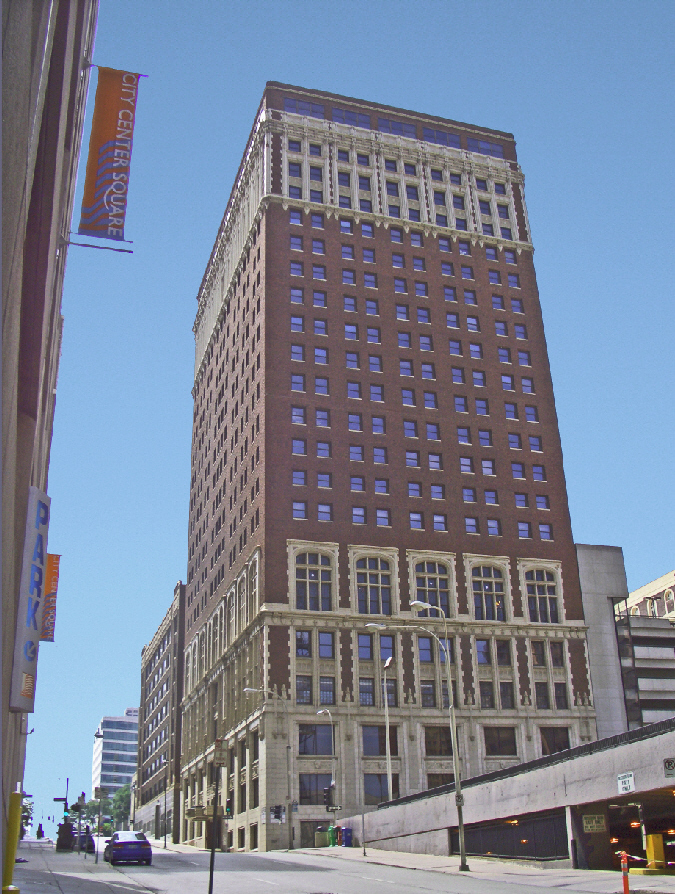
Kansas City Athletic Club/Continental Hotel/Mark Twain Tower

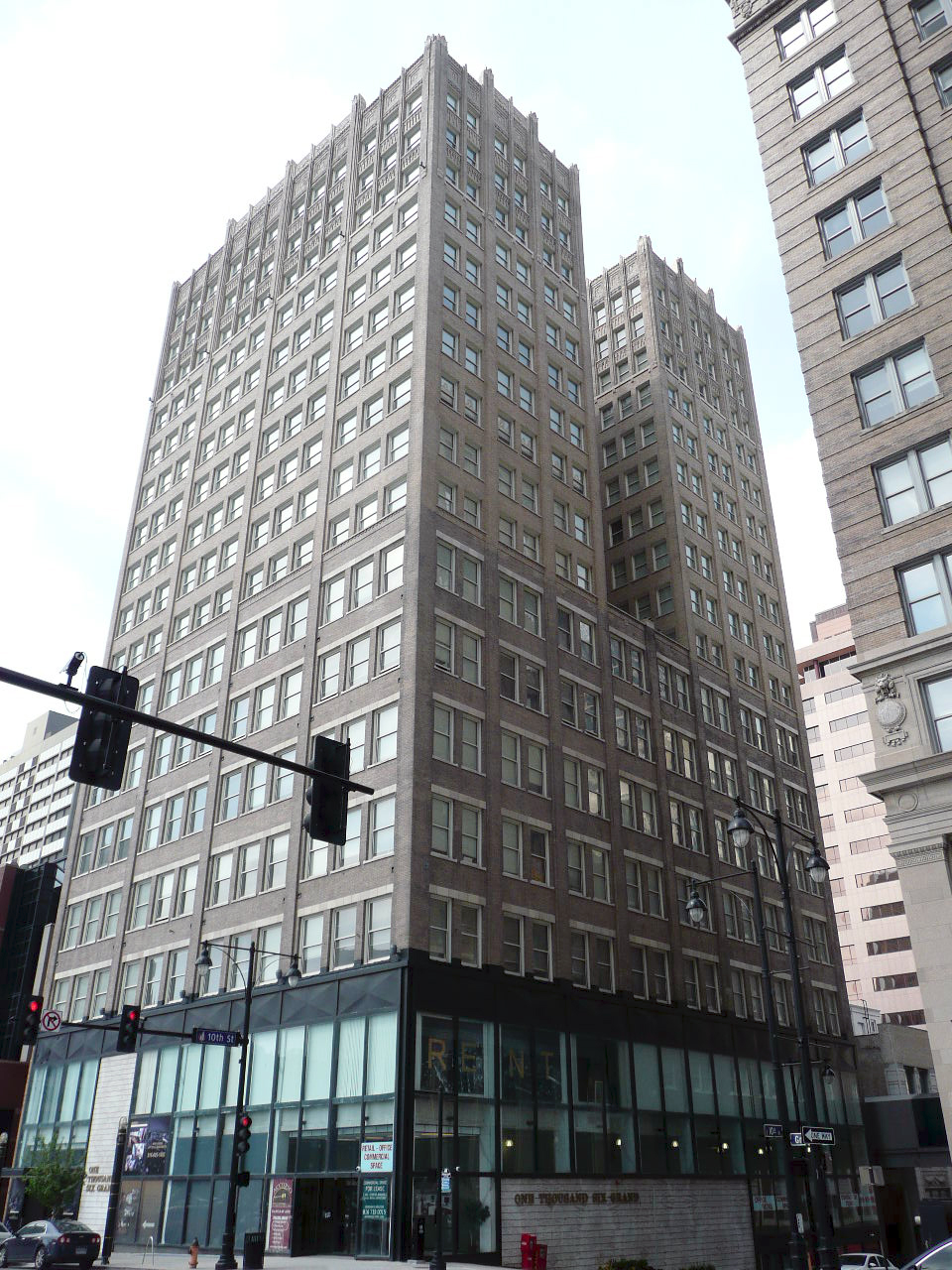
Dierks Building

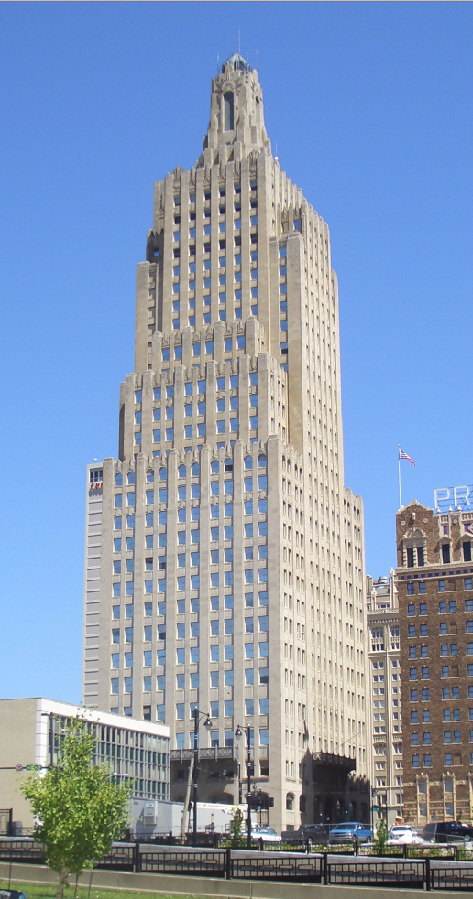
Kansas City Power & Light Building

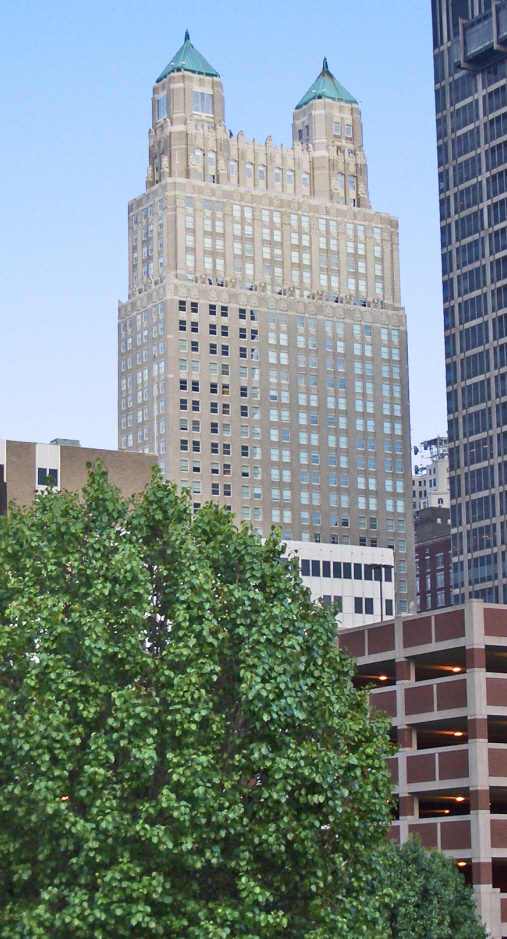
909 Walnut Tower (Fidelity National Bank)

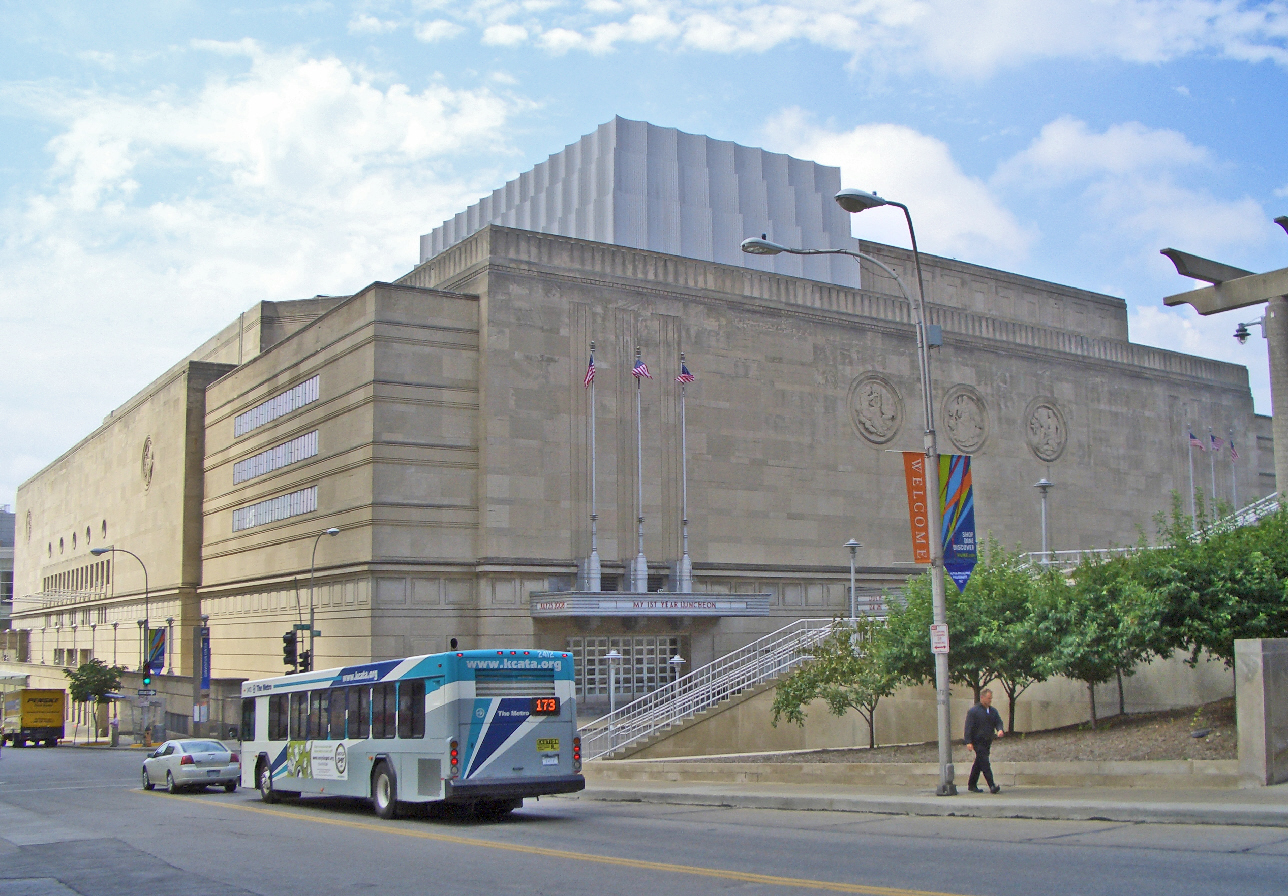
Municipal Auditorium
