= Alfred E. Barnes =

American architect (1892–1960)

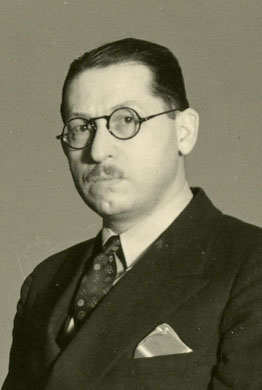
- Born: March 5, 1892; Kansas City, Missouri
- Died: May 11, 1960 (aged 68); Kansas City, Missouri
- Occupation: Architect
- Buildings: Kansas City Power & Light Building

Alfred Edward Barnes (5 March 1892 – 11 May 1960) was an architect from Kansas City, Missouri. He was a partner with Henry F. Hoit and Edwin M. Price in the leading architectural firm of Hoit, Price and Barnes.

== Life and work ==
Alfred Edward Barnes was born on March 5, 1892, in Kansas City. His grandfather was Asa Beebe Cross. He graduated from Manual Training High School in 1909, and was immediately hired as a draftsman at the firm of Howe & Hoit. Frank M. Howe died in January of that year, so the firm operated as Henry F. Hoit until January 1, 1919. That is when Barnes was made a partner along with Edwin M. Price creating the firm of Hoit, Price and Barnes. The firm designed many notable buildings in Kansas City including the Kansas City Power & Light Building, Fidelity National Bank, and the Southwestern Bell Telephone Building. He did extension studies through the Society of Beau-Arts Architects.

After Hoit, Price and Barnes closed in 1941, Barnes worked as a coordinating engineer at the Lake City Army Ammunition Plant during World War II. He also worked for the Long-Bell Lumber Company for four years before retiring in 1958. Barnes died at the age of 68 on May 11, 1960.

Barnes was the grandson of one of Kansas City's earliest architects, Asa Beebe Cross. Cross designed many homes on Quality Hill as well as the original Jackson County Courthouse and Union Depot. Union Depot, located in the West Bottoms, was the predecessor to Kansas City Union Station.

He was president of the Kansas City chapter of the American Institute of Architects in 1936 and president of the Architectural League of Kansas City in 1925 and 1926. He was also a member of the American Society of Civil Engineers, the Society of American Military Engineers, and the Kansas City Club.

Barnes was married to Clara F. Knotter on August 29, 1931. They had two daughters, Geraldine "Gerry" Claire (Conrath) and Catherine Anne (Scott). The family had an interest in historical preservation. Alfred Barnes was a member of the Native Sons of Kansas City and preserved many of the blueprints and other artifacts of Hoit, Price and Barnes. After his death, Clara donated these and other family artifacts to the State Historical Society of Missouri which created the collections of "Asa Beebe Cross (1826-1894) Papers (K0082)" and "Alfred Edward Barnes (1892-1960) Architectural Records (K0004)." The former includes a school paper titled "Biography of A.B. Cross by Gerry Claire Barnes, great granddaughter."
