= Longview Farm =

Historic house in Lee's Summit, Missouri, US

- U.S. National Register of Historic Places
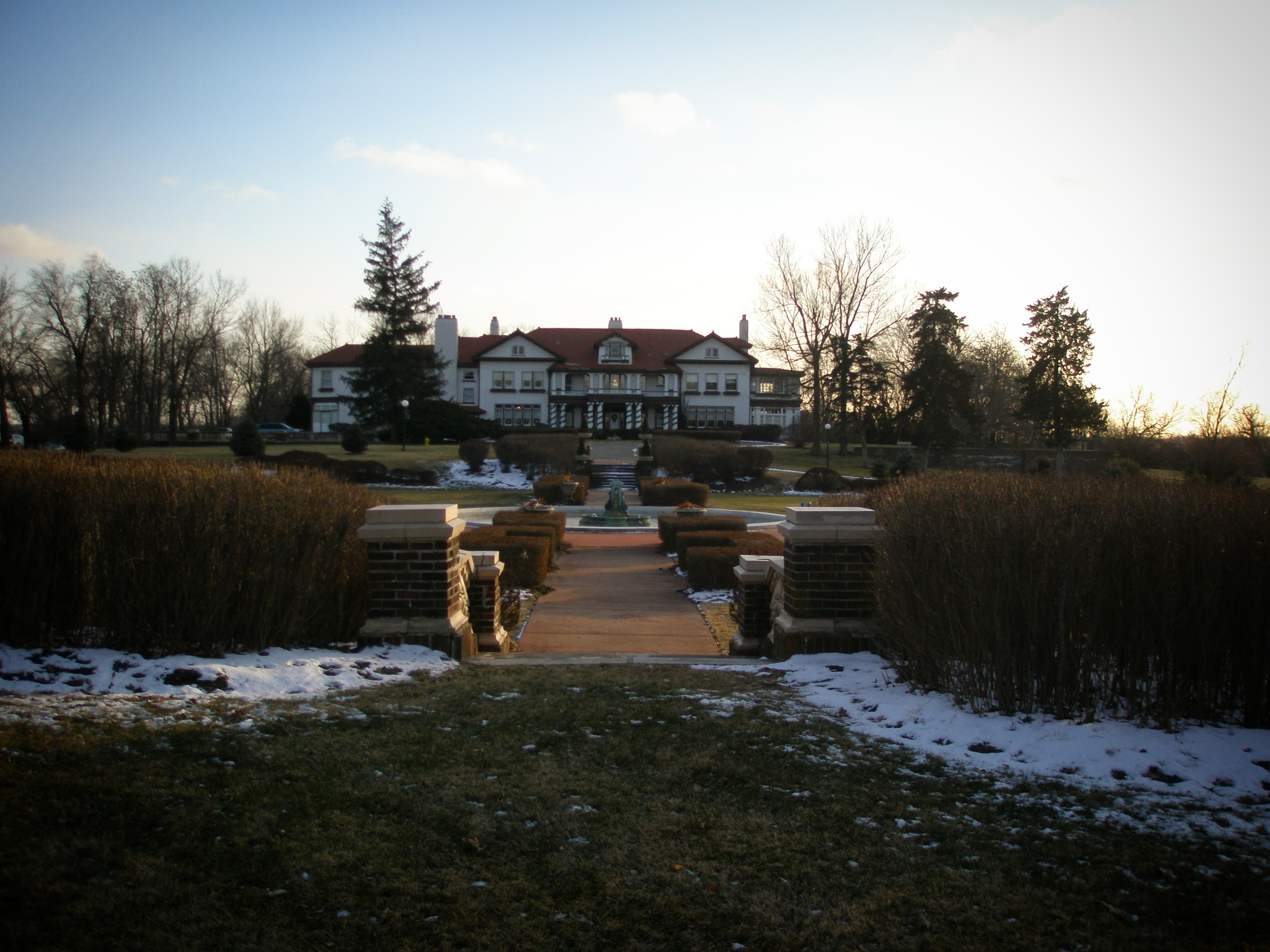

- Location within Missouri Location within the United States
- Location: 11700 and 850 S.W. Longview Rd., Lee's Summit, Missouri
- Coordinates: 38°54′20″N 94°26′49″W
- Area: 325 acres (132 ha)
- Built: 1913
- Architect: Hoit, Henry; Kessler, George
- Architectural style: Mission/Spanish Revival
- NRHP reference No.: 85003378
- Added to NRHP: October 24, 1985

Longview Farm in Lee's Summit, Missouri, United States was built by Robert A. Long. In planning the farm Long turned to Henry F. Hoit of Hoit, Price and Barnes, as he had designed Corinthian Hall and the R.A. Long Building. George Kessler was chosen as the landscape architect. The farm and over 50 other structures were built on 1,780 acres. Construction started in 1913 and completed in 1914 taking just 18 months to complete. The result is what came to be known as The World's Most Beautiful Farm. Construction workers included 50 Belgian craftsmen and 200 Sicilian stonemasons, among 2,000 other workers, to build the Longview Mansion and farm.

Employing 175 people, the farm not only consisted of all the amenities to care for the Longs prize horses but also a modern dairy, including prize Jersey cows, that produced enough milk for the farm, community, and charities. Hogs, chickens, farm land for the food, as well as green houses and a manicured main yard of 225 acres, were all part of the expansive farm. Scenic and self-sufficient, the farm and dairy even included underground electricity and a 100,000 gallon water tower.

== History ==
Robert Long made the decision to build the farm and the grandness shows no expense was spared. A place in the country was needed for his animals as the house in town (Corinthian Hall) was too small. By 1912 a place was selected and the planning began. In 1914 a small "town" had been created.

=== The farm ===
The farm had a list of modern marvels including experimental innovations. In the mansion Long did not want to use antique furniture because it was used. Long had new antique style replica furniture shipped from New York. The farm had a telephone system, complete plumbing, 25 miles (40 km) of white wooden fence that was built without nails or bolts, and over seven miles (11 km) of macadamized roads. The roads were not innovative because in the 1820s John Loudon McAdam, a Scottish engineer, pioneered the state-of-the-art Macadam road. Aside from the natural grass fields there were many acres of hay fields and feed still had to be brought in to feed all the livestock.

=== Buildings ===
There were over 50 buildings at Longview and, with the exception of the log grandstand and clubhouse, all were built of stucco with red tile roofs. 2000 Italian workers lived in tents while building the foundations and sewer system. The farm included an office, a chapel and school room. Several horse barns including, a draft horse barn, saddle horse barn, two broodmare horse barns, a hospital barn, a calf and shelter barn, a large show horse barn and arena, and a hog barn. There was a power house/garage, a milk house that included a bottling room, an ice plant, a blacksmith shop, post office, firehouse, and general store. There was a Hotel/Boarding House, equipped with a tennis court, where guests as well as unmarried workers could stay. Other buildings included houses for the General manager, C. J. Tucker, Assistant general manager, H. C. Spencer, as well as residence for J. T. Hook the manager of the saddle horse department. Married workers were provided a house for their families and the entire compound included underground wiring, water supplied by a six-inch water main, and a sewage system.

=== The mansion ===
No expense was spared on the 22,000-square-foot (2,000 m^{2}) structure with 48 rooms, 6 fireplaces, 14 bedrooms and 10 baths. It also claimed the first central vacuum system west of the Mississippi as well as steam heating.

=== The church ===
The church at the farm was opened in 1915 as the Longview Chapel Christian Church and is still active today.

== The Long family ==
Long was very successful in the lumber business with the Long-Bell Lumber Company and other enterprises. His lumber empire spanned several states and up to 110 lumber yards as well as over 250,000 acres of timber land by the 1900s. Already owning the Corinthian Hall mansion in Kansas City he decided to build the country estate and purchased the land in Lee's Summit. He and his wife Ella had a son that died shortly after birth and two girls, Sally America and Loula.

=== Sally America Long Ellis ===
Shortly after graduating from Mt. Vernon Finishing School in Washington, D.C. in 1903, Sally went on a world tour where she met her future husband. Hayne Ellis was a naval officer that had graduated from Annapolis in 1900. Nine days after meeting Sally he proposed and she accepted. They were married December 17, 1904. Sally traveled with her husband as a military wife while her sister took care of the horses at the farm. After Hayne died in 1961 Sally moved back to the farm to live with her sister. She died in 1970 at 91 years old.

=== Loula Long Combs ===
The undisputed head over the horses was Loula Long. She shared a love for horses with her father. She married Pryor Combs and it is said that she would agree to marry him only if he agreed to live at Longview Farm. They were married and he lived there until his death. The fact that Loula loved the farm is reflected in the fact that she lived there from the time the farm was opened until her death. After 65 years of showing horses and winning blue ribbons Loula died in 1971, shortly after her sister.

== Animals ==
By 1916 the farm had over 500 head of Jersey cattle, 232 being milked daily in two dairy barns, 16 Percheron draft horses, 61 saddle horses, 44 harness horses, 29 colts, 29 mules and 375 Duroc Jersey hogs. By 1941 there was over 800 cows and dairy barn #2 and #3 were added to accommodate the 500 cows being milked.

=== Horses ===
Loula chose the names for horses bought or born on the farm and there were many famous horses. She began to use -ion as the ending of many of the horses names. These included what she termed "the park four";

- Revelation
- Realization
- Hesitation
- Consternation
- The Dude, bought by Long in 1905 was Loula's first horse.
- Shoo Shoo and Hoo Hoo, bought in 1906, were hackney horses.
- The King, bought in 1908 was one of the best road horses of the time.
- Sensation was bought in 1908 and was the first horse of many with -ion at the end of the name.
- Beau Brummel, bought in 1909, a bay trotting stallion that cost $4500.
- Beaucaire, also bought in 1909 for $4500.
- In 1909 Loula bought Revelation for $1500. This was her prize horse and was buried in front of the arena with a memorial.
- Adoration, Importation, and Ovation were bought and imported between 1909 and 1910.
- Speculation was bought in 1912 and was a cow pony.
- Ladylike was Roberts horse
- Aspiration, a black mare, gave Loula the distinction of being the first woman to drive a winner in the Sporting Novice Roadster Class, at her first show at Madison Square Garden in 1913.
- Aviation and Affection (a chestnut gelding) allowed Loula to break the world's record for the heavy harness half-mile race for tandems at the Springfield, Ohio show in 1914.
- Easter Cloud won the first $10,000 stake at the Kentucky State Fair in 1917
- Chief of Longview, "The Great Parader", was born, raised, and trained at Longview Farm. Bought by Lurline Matson Roth, Chief was the World Champion stallion four times. He was the only horse to win the $10,000 stake at the Kentucky State Fair two successive years – 1928 and 1929. His fame as a model five-gaited horse was so wide that he became Ralston Purina's advertisement for their new horse feed. The Longs sold four brothers and sisters of the chief and received over $45,000.
- Independence Chief was the sire to Chief of Longview and was bought for $250.
- My Major Dare, was first American Saddle Horse to sell for $10,000. In 1921 he was valued at $25,000 with thirty-two first place ribbons in thirty-six times shown.
- Reputation, won a Championship as a pair with revelation.
- Fascination (Buck)
- Baby List
- Captivation (Cappy) was outstanding as a heavy harness horse.
- Invasion
- Animation

==== Other Saddle Horse Champions ====
- Kentucky's Best,
- Maurine Fisher
- La France

In 1920 Loula won thirty-one Championships and three Reserves in sixteen shows.

== Charities ==
Loula held benefit horse shows at the farm to raise money for the Boy Scouts, Animal Rescue League, Animal Protective Association, Children's Mercy Hospital, Red Cross and many others.

== NRHP ==
Longview Farm was listed on the National Register of Historic Places October 24, 1985. The listing includes the main residence, three staff residences, several farm outbuildings, ornamental monuments, and a chapel. The property is significant as an example of the era when a large estates were built by barons of industry. The farm was built as part of a large interrelated collection of buildings that included the farm, show horse faculties including racetrack and grandstand, a chapel/school house, living quarters for the large staff that at one time exceeded 200 workers, and a power house. Longview was intended to be a self-sustaining community and operated as such for many years.

== Current ==
=== Longview Farm Elementary school ===
The Longview Farm Elementary school became a realization in 2005 with a partnership involving the Lee's Summit R-7 School District, the City of Lee's Summit and Gale Communities. Gale community bought the remaining land of Longview Farm to establish a 260-acre project community, called New Longview, with historical preservation in mind. The founder, David Gale, approached Dr. Tony Stansberry, Lee's Summit School District superintendent, and the R-7 Board of Education, with the idea of converting the show horse arena into an elementary school. Sunday, Oct. 9th, 2005 the school celebrated a dedication ceremony

=== New Longview ===
The community of New Longview includes many historically restored buildings with a residential as well as a commercial district.

==== Residential district ====
Along with the 225 acre residential area there is a 50-acre park, the 146 acre Longview Community College campus, and the community borders the 4,800-acre Longview Park as well as the 900 acre Longview Lake.

==== Commercial district ====
The commercial district has 250,000 square feet (23,000 m^{2}) of retail stores and 200,000 square feet (19,000 m^{2}) of office space, including restaurants, a grocery store, a drug store, home furnishing stores, a bookstore, hair care salon and medical and business services. Citizens Union State Bank opened a new 11,000-square-foot (1,000 m^{2}) bank. Another 100,000 square feet (9,300 m^{2}) of office and commercial space will be centered on the refurbished calf and dairy barns at the center of the community.

=== Longview Lake ===
Part of Longview Farm was purchased by the U.S. Army Corps of Engineers and through a flood protection program resulted in the 930 acre Longview Lake. The Longview dam was built as part of the Little Blue River (Missouri) project.

=== Metropolitan Community College ===
Part of the farm was donated to become Metropolitan Community College - Longview.

== See also ==
Longview, Washington

== Sources ==
Long Historical Society foundation
