= I.R. Timlin =

American architect

Irving Ray Timlin
- Born: 15 December 1880; Cleveland, Ohio
- Died: October 18, 1955 (aged 74); University City, Missouri
- Occupation: Architect

Irving Ray Timlin (December 15, 1880 – October 18, 1955) was an American architect. He spent his entire career with the Southwestern Bell Telephone Company, where he was chief architect during the company's rapid expansion in the first half of the twentieth century. From the 1910s to the 1940s, Timlin designed or co-designed 140 buildings for the company in cities across the midwestern and southwestern United States.

Timlin joined the Bell Telephone Company of Missouri in 1904 as a draftsman in Kansas City. In 1907 he was made assistant equipment engineer, then architect in 1911. Timlin moved to St. Louis, headquarters of Bell Telephone's Southwestern System, in 1917. He retired in 1945.

Timlin was architect or associate architect of several skyscrapers, many of which are still in use. These include

- Oak Tower, Kansas City, Missouri;
- Three SBC Plaza (308 S. Akard St.), Dallas, Texas;
- Southwestern Bell Building, St. Louis, Missouri; and
- Southwestern Bell Building (105 Auditorium Cir.), San Antonio, Texas.
