= Mack B. Nelson House =

Coordinates: 39.0278°N 94.6044°W

- Interactive map of the Mack B. Nelson House area

General information
- Type: House
- Location: 5500 Ward Parkway; Kansas City, Missouri
- Governing body: private

Design and construction
- Architect: Henry F. Hoit

The Mack B. Nelson house is a historic residence located at 5500 Ward Parkway in the Sunset Hill neighborhood of the Country Club District in Kansas City, Missouri.

== History ==
Mack Barnabas Nelson was born in Arkansas in 1872. He came to Kansas City in 1894, where he worked for the Long-Bell Lumber Company. At the time of construction, Nelson was vice president of the lumber company, but he later came to the top position in the company after Long suffered financial reverses early in the Great Depression. Construction took place at the same time as the construction of the Bernard Corrigan House, which is located directly across 55th Street.

Tressie Souders, famous film director, worked as a maid in the house in 1921.

== Architecture ==
Built in 1915, the house is a large 14,661-square-foot (1,362.1 m^{2}) rectangle built around an interior atrium, which is lit by a movable skylight. It houses 16 bedrooms, 8 bathrooms, a swimming pool with a pool house, and a basketball court.

The architect was Henry F. Hoit who also designed the R. A. Long residence, which is now the Kansas City Museum.
