= Oak Tower =

Skyscraper in Kansas City, Missouri

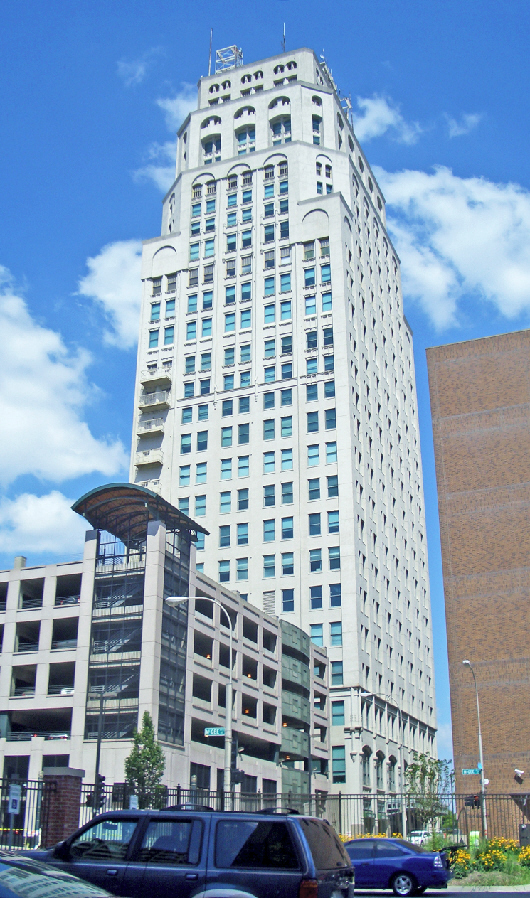
- Interactive map of the Oak Tower area

General information
- Status: Completed
- Type: Office
- Location: 324 East 11th Street, Kansas City, Missouri 64106
- Coordinates: 39.1012°N 94.5789°W
- Construction started: 1917
- Completed: 1920
- Renovated: 1928–1929 (addition, doubling the height)
- Owner: Cherry Hill Properties LLC [2021]

Height
- Roof: 379 ft (116 m)

Technical details
- Floor count: 28 (+2 below-grade)

Design and construction
- Architect: Hoit, Price & Barnes/I.R. Timlin
- Main contractor: Swenson Construction Company

Oak Tower, also called the Bell Telephone Building, is a 28-story skyscraper in Downtown Kansas City, Missouri.

Hoit, Price & Barnes, a local firm that conceived many of Kansas City's landmark structures, designed the building in association with I.R. Timlin as the headquarters of the Bell Telephone Co.'s newly consolidated Southwestern System.

The ground was broken at Eleventh and Oak Streets in 1917, but due to shortages of manpower and materials during the First World War, construction was delayed and was not completed until 1920. The new building served as Southwestern Bell's general headquarters for only a year before the company moved its main office to St. Louis. Thereafter the tower served as the headquarters of Southwestern Bell's operations in Missouri.

The tower was originally 14 stories (185 feet), without any setbacks, but the fast-growing telephone company soon required more space. An addition completed in 1929 doubled the tower's height and made it the tallest building in Missouri until the Kansas City Power & Light Building surpassed it in 1931.

Oak Tower's top half was built with Haydite, the first modern structural lightweight concrete, which had recently been invented and patented in Kansas City by Stephen J. Hayde. The tower's 1929 expansion was the first major project to use the new building material, and it allowed the addition of fourteen new stories, six more than would have been possible using conventional concrete.

The building's contractor, Swenson Construction Co., also built several other landmark Kansas City buildings including the Kansas City Power & Light Building, 909 Walnut, Jackson County Courthouse, Kansas City City Hall, Kansas City Live Stock Exchange and the Western Auto Building.

On January 11, 1964, during a snowstorm, a single-engine airplane crashed into the 28th story of the building at the corner facing Oak Street and 11th Street, killing all four people on board.

Oak Tower's original terra-cotta facade was covered in white stucco when it was sold in 1974.

In 2021 Oak Tower was sold.

== Data center ==
Today Oak Tower is one of the key fiber transit buildings for Kansas City and houses a 9,000-square-foot (840 m^{2}) Tier II data center. In 2013, the colocation data center is operated by Netsolus and is carrier neutral. In September 2018, the Tier II data center, operated by Netsolus, is 11,000-square-foot (1,000 m^{2}) and is home to several key transit and telecommunications providers including Cogent, Verizon, and Zayo. Netsolus also operates data centers in Phoenix, Denver, and Omaha. Founded in 2000, Netsolus is located in Oak Tower at Suite 1640.
