= Edwin M. Price =

American architect

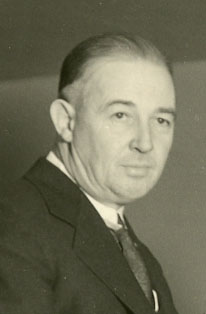
- Born: October 18, 1884; Webb City, Arkansas, U.S.
- Died: January 11, 1957 (aged 72); Van Buren, Arkansas, U.S.
- Occupation: Architect
- Buildings: Kansas City Power & Light Building

Edwin M. Price (18 October 1884 – 11 January 1957) was an American architect based in Kansas City, Missouri. He was a partner with Henry F. Hoit and Alfred E. Barnes in the notable firm Hoit, Price and Barnes.

== Life and work ==
Edwin Morgan Price was born on October 18, 1884, in Webb City, Arkansas. He went to school in Fort Smith, Arkansas and worked for firms in Fort Smith and St. Louis, Missouri before joining Howe, Hoit & Cutler in Kansas City in 1905. While with the firm, he graduated from a special course in architecture at the Massachusetts Institute of Technology (MIT) in 1908. Price became a partner with Henry F. Hoit in 1913. In 1919, Alfred E. Barnes became a partner and the firm was named Hoit, Price and Barnes.

Price's greatest contribution was the detailed ornamentation of the firm's buildings. He was also responsible for the lantern effect on the top of the Kansas City Power & Light Building.

Price married Mary Elizabeth Moore, of Van Buren, Arkansas on February 24, 1914. They had two children, Emily Ann (Cahill) and Edwin Johnson. They returned to Van Buren after Price's retirement. He died there on January 11, 1957.
