= R. A. Long Building =

- U.S. National Register of Historic Places
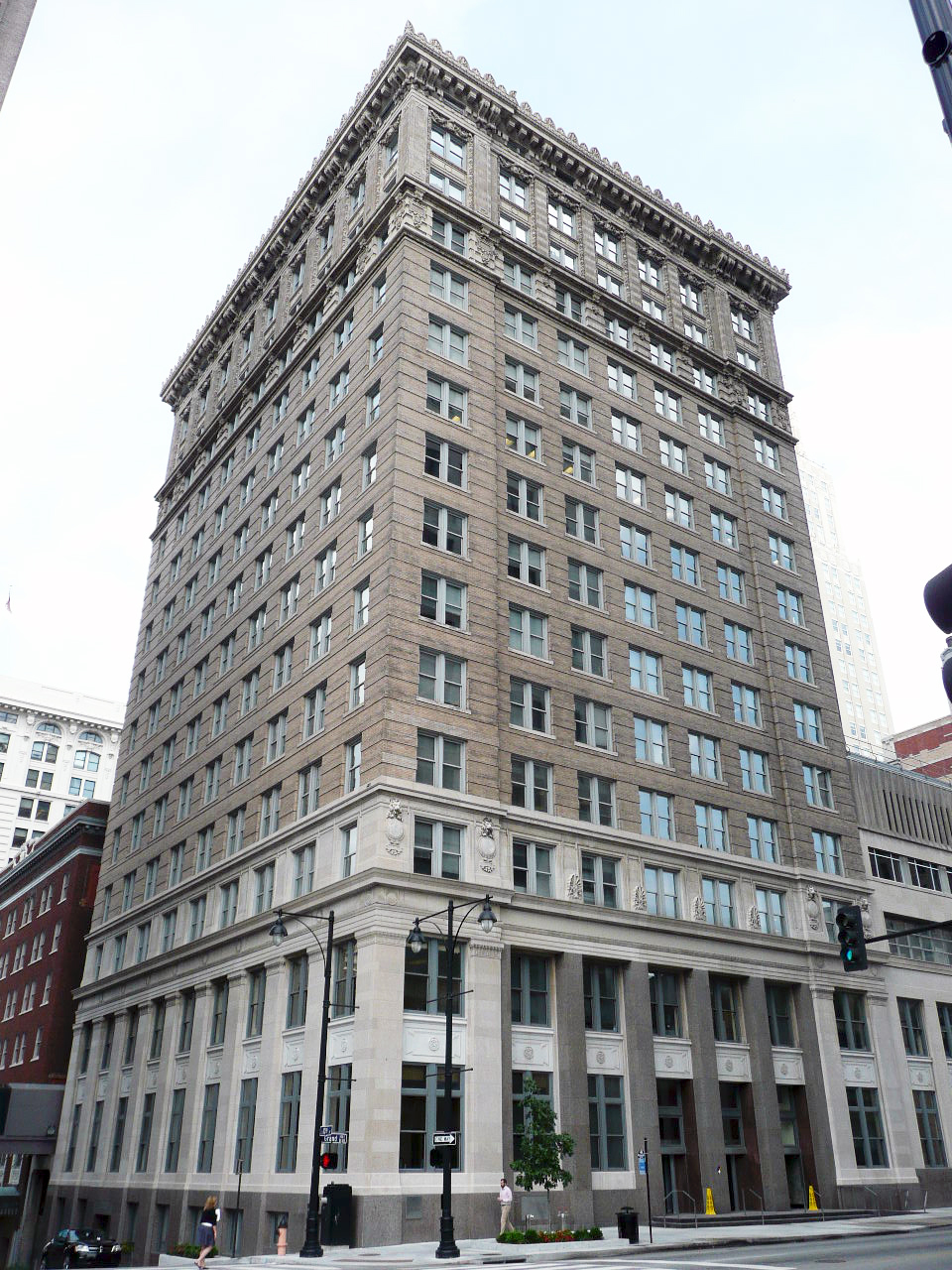
- R.A. Long Building

- Location within Missouri Location within the United States
- Location: 928 Grand Blvd, Kansas City, Missouri
- Coordinates: 39°6′16″N 94°34′51″W
- Built: 1907
- NRHP reference No.: 02001683
- Added to NRHP: January 8, 2003

The R. A. Long building is a historic skyscraper in Kansas City, Missouri, located on the northwest corner of the intersection of 10th Street and Grand Avenue.

In 1906, Robert A. Long's Long-Bell Lumber Company had outgrown the office space in the Keith & Perry Building. Expanding operations and the need for a larger headquarters resulted in the construction of the R.A. Long Building, completed in 1907. This was the first all-steel framed building in Kansas City, Missouri with 16 stories and over 600 offices. Long's office was located on the 8th floor.

It was the first offices of the Federal Reserve Bank of Kansas City from 1914 to 1921 when it moved across the street to the newly constructed 925 Grand.

The renamed City National Bank & Trust Company opened their headquarters on the first floor in 1934. In 1947, the bank purchased the building.

The building was placed on the National Register of Historic Places on January 8, 2003.

In 2000, UMB started major renovations but the 8th and 14th floors were designated historic preservation floors to be restored to as close to original specifications as possible.
