= 909 Walnut =

Skyscraper in Kansas City, Missouri

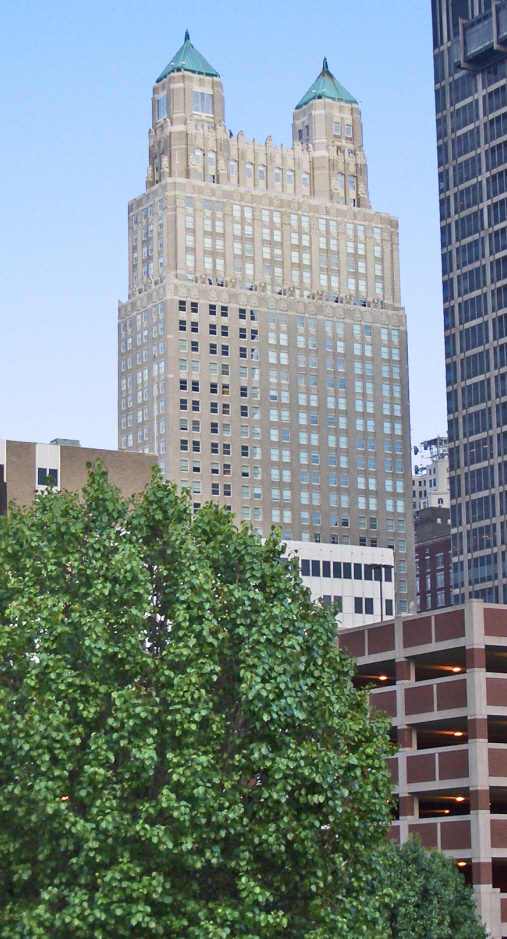
- Interactive map of the 909 Walnut area

General information
- Status: Completed
- Type: Residential apartments
- Location: 909 Walnut, Kansas City, Missouri
- Coordinates: 39°06′12″N 94°34′54″W
- Construction started: 1930; 96 years ago
- Completed: 1931; 95 years ago
- Cost: US$2.85 million
- Owner: Worcester Investments
- Operator: Worcester Communities

Height
- Antenna spire: 498 feet (152 m)
- Roof: 471 feet (144 m)
- Top floor: 465 feet (142 m)

Technical details
- Floor count: 35
- Floor area: 477,649 sq ft (44,375.0 m^{2})

Design and construction
- Architect: Hoit, Price & Barnes
- Developer: Fidelity National Bank & Trust
- Main contractor: Swenson Construction Company
- Fidelity National Bank and Trust Company Building, The
- U.S. National Register of Historic Places
- Location within Missouri
- Location: 911 Walnut St., Kansas City, Missouri
- Coordinates: 39°06′08″N 94°34′53″W
- Area: 0.4 acres (0.16 ha)
- Built: 1930
- Architect: Hoit, Price, and Barnes
- Architectural style: Art Deco
- NRHP reference No.: 97000908
- Added to NRHP: August 14, 1997

909 Walnut (formerly Fidelity National Bank & Trust Building, Federal Office Building and 911 Walnut) is a twin-spired, 35-story, 471-foot (144 m) residential skyscraper in Downtown Kansas City, Missouri. It was Missouri's tallest apartment building until the conversion of the Kansas City Power & Light building and the tenth-tallest habitable building in Missouri.

In 1997, the building was added to the National Register of Historic Places.

== History ==
The structure was built in 1931 as the Fidelity National Bank & Trust Building (referred to locally as the Fidelity Building) at an estimated cost of $2.85 million, including bank fixtures. The site had previously been a two-story post office and federal building until 1904, when Fidelity purchased the site for its headquarters. The two-story building was razed in 1930. The new building mimicked the original federal twin-spire structure, in an Art Deco-Gothic Revival architectural motif.

The building's architect — Hoit, Price & Barnes — also designed the nearby Power and Light Building in the Art Deco style.

The bank was liquidated in 1933 during the Great Depression.

On June 14, 1946, under the administration of then-U.S. President Harry S. Truman, the Federal Government acquired the building at a reported price of $3.3 million. As a result, it was renamed the Federal Office Building.

In 1954, the headquarters of the newly formed Severe Local Storms Warning Service of the United States Weather Bureau moved to the building from Washington, D.C. A Radome for a weather radar was constructed between the towers on a steel skeleton rising above them, creating a landmark until 1995 when it was removed and the service relocated to Norman, Oklahoma, where it became the Storm Prediction Center.

Another distinctive landmark was the "town clock" in the north tower, which had first started keeping time in the original 1885 post office and was then placed in the tower. A bell cast by the McShane Bell Company of Baltimore, Maryland chimed in 1882. The clock face has since been removed and replaced by large windows for the highest residential living unit within five states. The bell was sold by the former owner in 2000 and was carried away by helicopter.

When the government left the building in 1995, Northland Management & Investment of Kansas City purchased it for $500,000. The building remained vacant until it was sold in 2000 to Simbol Commercial Inc. of Dallas for $2 million. Following the September 11 attacks, the building was renamed from 911 Walnut to 909 Walnut. Simbol was said to have spent $64 million to convert this building and the 929 Walnut Building into 159 apartments and 110,000 square feet (10,000 m^{2}) of commercial office space and to construct a 323-car public garage. The rooftop of the garage also includes a 12,000-square-foot (1,100 m^{2}) award-winning garden.

The first four floors are occupied by Entertainment Properties Trust (NYSE:EPR).

== See also ==
- Tallest buildings in Kansas City
- National Register of Historic Places listings in Downtown Kansas City, Missouri
