= Kansas City Power & Light (disambiguation) =

Kansas City Power & Light may refer to:

- Kansas City Power and Light Company, an electric provider.
- The Kansas City Power & Light District, a downtown redevelopment area.
- The Kansas City Power and Light Building, a skyscraper.
