= Murder of Artemus Ogletree =

Unsolved 1935 murder in Kansas City, Missouri, US

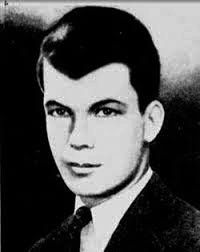
- Picture of Ogletree distributed after his body was identified, taken c. 1934
- Date: January 5, 1935
- Location: Hotel President, Kansas City, Missouri, U.S.; 39.0975°N 94.5843°W
- Also known as: Room 1046 mystery
- Type: Homicide by stabbing and beating
- Burial: Memorial Park Cemetery, Kansas City, Kansas, U.S.

On January 5, 1935, a man who had given his name as Roland T. Owen, later identified as Artemus Ogletree, died at a hospital in Kansas City, Missouri, United States from beating and stabbing injuries. His death was preceded by a two-day stay in Room 1046 at the Hotel President in what is now the city's Power & Light District marked by communication with someone named "Don" and unusual behavior and incidents noted by the hotel's staff, before he was found wounded in his room the morning of his death. When no next of kin could be located, leading to suspicions that his name was an alias, his body was stored in a local funeral parlor for almost two months. A planned burial in the city's potter's field was averted when an anonymous donor provided funds for a funeral and a floral arrangement signed by the name "Louise."

The man's true identity remained unknown for a year and a half until Ruby Ogletree, an Alabama woman who had seen a photo of a distinctive scar on his head in the news, identified him as her son Artemus. She said he had left Birmingham in 1934 at the age of 19 to hitchhike to California. Later she received two letters purportedly from him, one from Egypt. In August 1935, a caller claiming to be from Memphis, Tennessee, told her that Artemus was in Cairo. The letters had also been sent after Artemus' death. Records kept by shipping companies found no records that Ogletree had gone to Egypt.

The letters later were used to link the killing to a 1937 murder in New York, but no charges were filed against the man arrested in that case, one of whose aliases had been "Donald Kelso." The FBI later investigated but was unable to produce any new leads. No other suspect has ever been identified.

In 2012, Dr. John Arthur Horner, a historian at the Kansas City Public Library wrote two posts on the library's blog about the case. At the end of the last one he revealed that in 2003, he had taken a call from someone out of state related to the case. The caller said that they had been helping to inventory the belongings of a recently deceased elderly person when they found a box with newspaper clippings about the Ogletree case and an item mentioned repeatedly in the stories, but they refused to say what that item was. The Kansas City police continue to investigate.

== Biography ==
Artemus Ogletree was born in Florida in 1915, one of three children. During his childhood, an accident with some hot grease left a sizable scar on his head above his ear, which remained hairless afterward. In 1934 he left his family, by then living in Birmingham, Alabama, to hitchhike to California. He kept them updated on his progress by mail; they wired him money.

== President Hotel stay ==
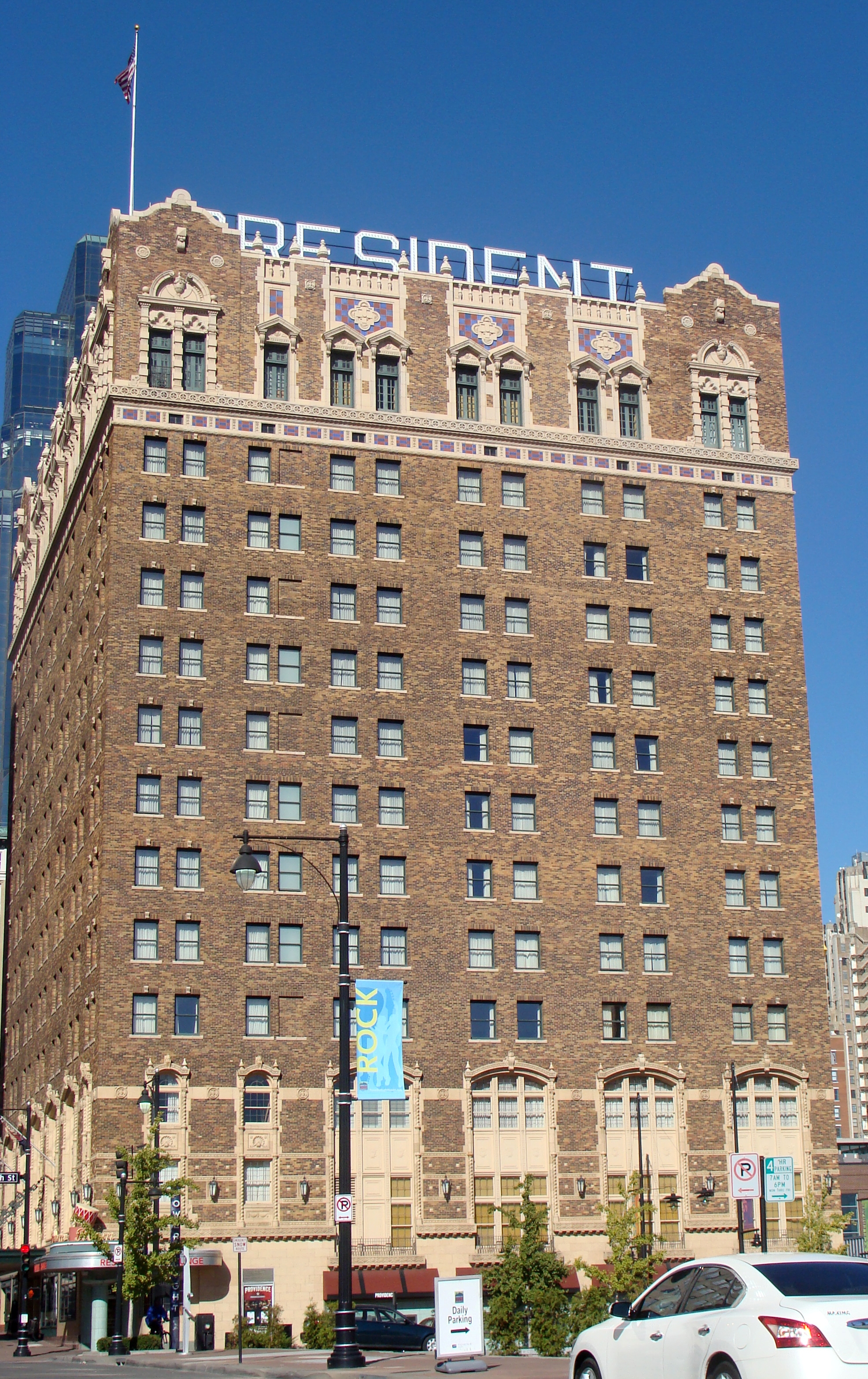
The Hotel President in 2012

=== January 2 ===
Early on the afternoon of January 2, 1935, Ogletree walked into the Hotel President, in what is now the Power & Light District of Kansas City, Missouri, and asked for an interior room several floors up, giving his name as Roland T. Owen, with a Los Angeles address. Staff remembered him as being dressed well and wearing a dark overcoat; he brought no bags with him.

Ogletree paid for one night. The staff noted that in addition to the visible scar on his temple, he had cauliflower ear, and concluded he was probably a boxer or professional wrestler. They believed him to be in his early 20s.

Randolph Propst, a bellhop, accompanied Ogletree up in the elevator to the 10th floor. On the way, Ogletree told him that he had spent the previous night at the nearby Muehlebach Hotel but found the $5 ($100 in current dollars) nightly rate too high. Propst opened Room 1046, which per the guest's request was on the inside, overlooking the hotel's courtyard rather than the street outside. He watched as Ogletree took a hairbrush, comb and toothpaste from his overcoat pocket, the extent of his unpacking.

After Ogletree put those items above the sink, he and Propst left the room. The bellboy returned to lock it, and gave Ogletree the key. After returning to the lobby, he saw Ogletree leave the hotel. A short time afterward, Mary Soptic, one of the hotel maids, returned from a day off to work the afternoon shift. She went into Room 1046 and was surprised to find Ogletree there, since the previous night a woman had been in the room. She apologized, but he said she could go ahead and clean the room.

While she did, she noticed that he had the shades drawn and left only one dim lamp on. This would remain the case when she encountered Ogletree in the room on other occasions during his stay. "He was either worried about something or afraid" in addition to this preference for low light, she told police later. After she had been cleaning for a few minutes, Ogletree put his overcoat on and brushed his hair. He then left, but asked her to leave the room unlocked as he was expecting some friends in a few minutes.

Soptic did as he asked. At 4 p.m. she returned to the room with freshly laundered towels. Inside, the room was dark. She saw Ogletree lying on the bed, fully dressed. Visible in the light from the hallway was a note on his bedside table that read "Don: I will be back in fifteen minutes. Wait".

=== January 3 ===
The next morning, Soptic returned to Room 1046 around 10:30. The door was locked, which led her to assume that Ogletree was out since it could only be locked from the outside, but when she opened it with her own key Ogletree was present, sitting in the dark just where he had been the previous afternoon. The phone rang and he answered it. "No, Don, I don't want to eat. I am not hungry. I just had breakfast ... No, I am not hungry", he said.

Still holding the phone, Ogletree asked Soptic about her job as she cleaned. He wanted to know if she was responsible for the entire floor, and if the President was residential. He repeated his complaint about the Muehlebach's exorbitant rates, after which she finished cleaning, and left.

Again at 4 p.m., Soptic returned with fresh towels. Inside Room 1046, she could hear two men talking, so she knocked. A voice she described as loud and deep, probably not Ogletree's, asked who it was. She responded that she had brought fresh towels, to which the voice said "We don't need any". Yet Soptic knew there were no towels in the room, as she had taken them herself in the morning.

Two hours later, Jean Owen of Lee's Summit, near Kansas City, checked into the President after having shopped in the city for a few hours. Feeling sick, she had decided not to drive back home that night. She was given Room 1048; her boyfriend, who worked in a flower shop in the city, came to visit her there at 9:20 p.m. and stayed for two hours. Later that night, she told police, she heard men and women talking loudly and profanely all over the floor.

Owen was not the only person to note unusual late night activity on the President's 10th floor. Elevator operator Charles Blocher, who began his shift at midnight, reported later that he was fairly busy until 1:30 a.m. After that time, most of the hotel quieted down for the night, except for a loud party in Room 1055.

Blocher recalled one visitor in particular, a woman he had seen at the hotel visiting male guests in their rooms on other occasions and thus believed to be a prostitute, a conclusion shared by other hotel staff who were familiar with her. She came in first sometime during his first three hours; he took her to the 10th floor where she asked about Room 1026. Five minutes later, the elevator was summoned there again; it turned out to be the same woman, who expressed puzzlement that her client was not in Room 1026 since, she said, he had called her and on previous visits with him he had always been present. She wondered if, in fact, he was in Room 1024 since she could see through the room's transom window that the light was on in there. She remained on the floor after the conversation.

A half-hour later, Blocher got another signal to take the elevator back to the 10th floor. The woman was waiting again and he took her down to the lobby. An hour later he took her, and a different man, to the 9th floor. At 4:15 a.m., a call from that floor turned out to be the woman; he took her to the lobby and she left the hotel for the night. Another call to the 9th floor 15 minutes later turned out to be the man who had come up with her. He told Blocher he could not sleep and was going out for a walk.

==== Possible encounter outside hotel ====
Whether these activities are related to the Ogletree case has not been established. He may not have been at the hotel earlier that night. At 11 p.m. Robert Lane, a city worker driving on 13th Street near Lydia Avenue, saw a man dressed in only an undershirt, pants and shoes run into his path and flag him down. When Lane stopped, the man apologized, saying he had mistaken Lane's car for a taxi.

The man asked Lane if he could take him to somewhere he might be able to get a taxi. Lane agreed and let the man in. "You look as if you've been in it bad", he observed; the man swore he would kill someone else tomorrow, presumably in retaliation for whatever had been done to him. In the mirror Lane saw a deep scratch on the man's arm; he also noticed that he was cupping his arm, possibly to catch blood from a more severe wound.

At the nearby intersection of 12th Street and Troost Avenue, where taxi drivers often waited for fares during the overnight hours, Lane stopped and let the man out. The man thanked him, got out, and honked the horn of a taxi parked nearby, drawing the driver from a nearby restaurant, after which Lane drove away.

After Ogletree's death, Lane went to view the body. He saw the same scratch on the arm and went to the police, telling them he believed Ogletree had been the man he picked up.

=== January 4 ===
At 7 a.m., a new switchboard operator, Della Ferguson, came on shift. She was preparing to make a requested wakeup call to Room 1046 when she noticed a light indicating that the phone there was off the hook.

Propst, who had led Ogletree there two days earlier, was on shift again and drew the assignment. The door to Room 1046 was locked, with a "Do Not Disturb" sign hanging from the doorknob. After several loud knocks, a voice from inside told him to enter; however he could not as the door had been locked. The same voice told him, after another knock, to turn on the lights, but he still could not enter. Finally, Propst just shouted through the door to hang the phone up, and left.

Propst told Ferguson that the guest in Room 1046 was probably drunk and she should wait another hour. At 8:30 a.m., the phone had still not been hung up. Another bellboy, Harold Pike, was sent to the 10th floor. The "Do Not Disturb" sign was still on the door, and it was still locked, but Pike had a key and let himself in. Inside he found Ogletree in the dark, lying on the bed naked, apparently drunk. The light from the hallway showed some dark spots on the bedding, but rather than turn on the room light Pike went to the telephone stand, where he saw the phone had been knocked to the floor. He put it back on the stand, replacing the handset.

Shortly after 10:30 a.m., another operator reported that the phone in Room 1046 was once again off the hook. Again Propst was sent to the room to see what was going on; the "Do Not Disturb" sign remained on the knob. This time he had a key, and after his knocks drew no response, he opened the door and found Ogletree on his knees and elbows two feet (60 cm) away, his head bloodied. Propst turned the light on, put the phone back on the hook, and then noticed blood on the walls of both the main room and bathroom, as well as on the bed itself.

Propst went downstairs immediately for help. He returned with the assistant manager, but when they did they could only open the door six inches (15 cm), as Ogletree had in the interim fallen on the floor. Eventually Ogletree got up and when the two hotel employees were able to enter the room, he went and sat on the edge of the bathtub. (Note: Some accounts conflate these two events, suggesting that Ogletree was sitting on the edge of the bathtub when the room was opened.) The assistant manager called the police; they were joined by Dr. Harold Flanders of Kansas City General Hospital. (Note: In other accounts the first responders are described as the hotel's house doctor and detective.)

Ogletree had been bound with cord around his neck, wrists, and ankles. His neck had further bruising, suggesting someone had been attempting to strangle him. He had been stabbed more than once in the chest above the heart; one of these wounds had punctured his lung. Blows to his head had left him with a skull fracture on the right side. In addition to the blood Propst had seen, there was some additional spatter on the ceiling.

Dr. Flanders cut the cords from Ogletree's wrists and asked him who had caused the injuries. According to later newspaper reports, Ogletree responded that "nobody" and said he had fallen and hit his head on the bathtub. When the doctor asked if he had been trying to kill himself, he reportedly denied it. However, the original medical affidavit from that day, released years later by Kansas City magazine, does not mention the victim speaking at all during the encounter.

Ogletree lost consciousness shortly afterward and was taken to the hospital, where he arrived comatose and died shortly after midnight on January 5.

== Investigation ==
=== Jean Owen interrogation ===
The Kansas City Police Department (KCPD) began investigating immediately by interviewing Jean Owen, whose identical last name and proximity to the dead man overnight struck them as interesting. They detained her while she told them what she had heard the night before. After her boyfriend came to the police station and corroborated her account, she was released and returned to Lee's Summit.

=== Cause of death ===
Doctors performed an autopsy on Ogletree and determined he had died from his wounds. Dr. Flanders had examined not just the body but the bloodstains in the room. Since much of it had dried by the time he had arrived, he estimated the wounds had been inflicted between 4 and 5 a.m. that day, consistent with what Pike had seen and before Propst's first visit.

Detectives searching Room 1046 took note as much of what they did not find as what they did. Consistent with what Propst had observed, there were no clothes in the closets or drawers. The only evidence of anything other than what Ogletree had been wearing was the tag of a necktie, indicating it had been made by a New Jersey company. Also missing from the room were the soap, shampoo, and towels provided by the hotel to every room.

There were no knives, which led to the dismissal of suicide as a cause of Ogletree's death since the stab wounds in his chest could not be accounted for; the cords tying him up also suggested the involvement of others. One of the room's two glasses was found in the sink, missing a piece; the other was on the shelf. Detectives found some other items that might have been evidence: a hairpin, safety pin, unsmoked cigarette, and a full bottle of diluted sulfuric acid. Four fingerprints, small enough that detectives believed they had been a woman's, were found on the room's phone; they could not be matched to Ogletree or to any of the hotel employees who had been known to have entered the room.

The police sought help through the press. Both of the city's evening newspapers carried the story on their front pages the next day. "There is no doubt that someone else is mixed up in this", Detective Johnson told reporters, confirming that the case was considered a homicide.

== Identity ==
It soon became apparent that "Roland T. Owen" was in all likelihood an alias. Officers in Kansas City contacted the Los Angeles Police Department (LAPD) to notify next of kin, but were informed that they could find no record that anyone under that name was living in the California city at the time. The dead man's fingerprints were sent to what was at the time the Justice Department's Bureau of Investigation (later the FBI) to find a possible match in their collection.

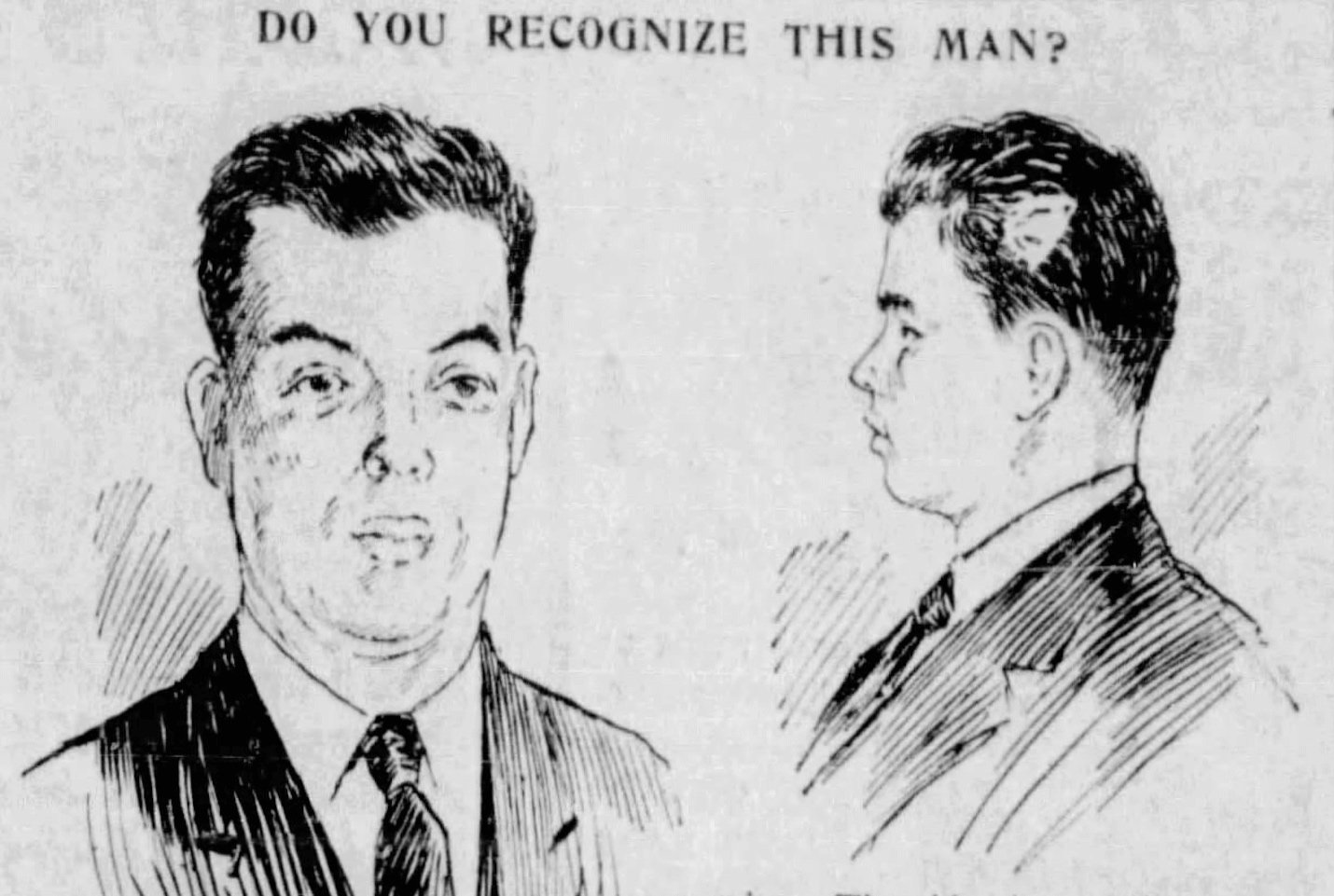
Portrait of Roland T. Owen, murdered in room 1046 of President Hotel in Kansas City in 1935, made by the police to help in their investigation. Kansas City Public Library.

A woman called the Hotel President that night to ask what "Roland T. Owen" looked like. She told the desk that he lived in Clinton, 50 miles (80 km) southeast of Kansas City. On January 6, the Sunday newspapers reported that the man in Room 1046 had died under an assumed name, and tips began coming in. Members of the public went to the local funeral home where he had been laid out, leading Lane to tell police of his encounter with the man. After interviewing Lane, Johnson was not as certain as Lane was that the man had been Ogletree, since none of the hotel staff had reported seeing him leave or return during the night of January 3–4. Police were able to establish one sighting of Ogletree outside the hotel, a report that he had been seen with two women at several "liquor places" on 12th Street.

Wire services began picking up the story, and it ran in newspapers and on radio around the country, with requests to send photographs to Kansas City. More leads on the man's identity came in as a result, and the KCPD had to devote considerable time to corresponding with police all over the country via mail and telegram to follow up on leads. Eventually they were able to eliminate many.

In Kansas City, an early lead proved false when a bloodied towel found at the hotel turned out to have been used to clean up Room 1046 after the police had left. Officers recalled Propst's account that on his way there after he checked in, the man had said that he had left the nearby Muehlebach Hotel after one night due to their high rates, and checked with that hotel's staff. No Roland T. Owen had checked in there, but staff recalled a man of Ogletree's appearance checking in under the name Eugene K. Scott, also giving Los Angeles as his address, and requesting a room on the interior of the building. Again, after investigating, the LAPD reported that there was no one by that name in their city.

The mystery seemed solved when a man identified the body as his cousin, but then when the man's sister came to view the body, she confirmed that the cousin had in fact died five years earlier; the resemblance between the two had been very strong. A week into the investigation, Toni Bernardi, a wrestling promoter from Little Rock, Arkansas, said after viewing the body that the man, identifying himself as Cecil Werner, had approached him around the beginning of December 1934 about wrestling some matches. Bernardi had referred him to another promoter in Omaha, Nebraska, but that promoter did not recognize Ogletree.

Within a few days, two new homicides in the city drew detectives' attention away from the case, even as more were assigned to the homicide squad. Leads were still followed, but less vigorously than they had been in the week after the case, and none of them yielded any significant information. Newspaper coverage likewise dwindled.

== Funeral ==
The case returned to the newspapers on March 3, when the funeral home where the body had been kept announced it would be burying the man in the city's potter's field the next day. That day, the funeral home received a call from a man who asked that the funeral be delayed so they could send the funeral home the money for a grave and service at Memorial Park Cemetery in Kansas City, Kansas, so, the caller said, the dead man, "would be near my sister." The funeral director warned the caller he would have to tell the police about the call; the caller said he knew and that did not bother him.

The caller was slightly more forthcoming when the funeral director asked why Ogletree had been killed. According to the caller, Ogletree had had an affair with one woman while engaged to marry another. The caller and the two women had apparently arranged the encounter with him at the President in order to exact revenge. "Cheaters usually get what's coming to them!" the caller said, and hung up.

The service was postponed per the anonymous caller's request. On March 23, the funeral home received a delivery envelope, the address carefully lettered using a ruler with $25 ($600 in current dollars) wrapped in newspaper; it was enough to cover the expenses. The sender was unknown.

Two additional envelopes with $5 each were sent to a local florist for an arrangement of 13 American Beauty roses to go with the grave, after a similar call was made to them, in which the caller reportedly said, "I'm doing this for my sister. I'll send you a five dollar bill. Special delivery." Both phone calls turned out to have been made from pay phones. Included with this payment was a card, with disguised handwriting, reading "Love Forever – Louise". The funeral was held shortly afterwards. Besides the officiating minister, the only attendees were police detectives, some of whom served as pallbearers. Other detectives, posing as gravediggers, staked out the grave for the next several days, but no one came to visit.

Several days after the funeral, a woman called the Kansas City Journal-Post's newsroom to inform them that their earlier story that the dead man from Room 1046 would be buried in a pauper's grave was incorrect, that he had in fact been given a formal funeral. She said the funeral home and flower shop could verify this. Asked to identify herself, she said "Never mind, I know what I'm talking about", Pressed for what that was, she responded, "He got into a jam", and ended the conversation.

== Identification ==
Images of the dead man continued to be circulated nationwide in the hope of identifying him. One of these finally did, when a friend of Ruby Ogletree in Birmingham, Alabama, showed her an issue of The American Weekly, a Sunday newspaper supplement published by the Hearst Corporation, with an article about the case. The unidentified man looked a great deal like her son Artemus, whom the family had not seen since he left to hitchhike to California in 1934, although he had kept up correspondence with them.

Ruby contacted the KCPD, and was able to provide enough information about the previous pseudonymous corpse, including a description of his head scar, which she explained was the result of a childhood accident in which some hot grease had spilled there. In November, another issue of the supplement carried a story identifying the man as Artemus Ogletree and explaining how his identity had been determined.

While that question had been answered, Ruby's account raised more questions. She had received several letters purportedly from her son after he had been killed. The first, early in 1935, postmarked in Chicago, aroused her suspicions since it was typewritten and as far as she knew, Artemus did not know how to type. It was also written in a highly colloquial style that was not consistent with his previous letters.

In May 1935, another letter purportedly from Artemus said he was going to Europe. It was followed by a special-delivery letter saying that his ship was sailing that day. Both were sent from New York.

In August of that year, Ruby received a telephone call from Memphis, Tennessee. The man calling told her that Artemus had saved him "from a band of thugs" in Cairo, Egypt, and that Artemus himself could not call because he was now living in Cairo, where he had married a wealthy woman and was well. He was unable to write, the caller said, because he had lost one of his thumbs in the fight where he had saved the caller.

Ruby talked with the man for forty-five minutes. She recalled that he spoke wildly and irrationally, but seemed to have first-hand knowledge of Artemus. The man identified himself as Godfrey Jordan, but Ruby told police that she believed he was actually Joe Simpson—a friend who Artemus left home with. Her conviction grew stronger upon confronting him on December 28, 1939, after several previous unsuccessful attempts. According to Ruby, Simpson promised to give her a "badly typed" letter that Artemus allegedly wrote to him, but he never arrived at the appointed time to hand over the letter.

If Artemus had, at some point before his death, gone to Egypt or anywhere else overseas, he had not done so under his own name. No steamship company at the time had any record that he had traveled with them. The consular section at the U.S. Embassy in Cairo was unable to find any evidence he had been there.

== Later developments ==
Information developed through the police's conversations with Ruby Ogletree helped them establish a third hotel in Kansas City—the St. Regis—where Artemus had stayed. There, he had shared a room with another man. Whether that had been "Don" could not be established.

In 1937 the New York City police arrested a man named Joseph Martin on a murder charge, after he had killed a man he shared a room with and put the body in a trunk to be shipped to Memphis. Among the several aliases he was found to have used was "Donald Kelso". According to a story about the case in The New Yorker, the KCPD had matched samples of his handwriting to that in the letters written to Ruby Ogletree.

No charges were filed against the man for the Ogletree case, and the KCPD kept the case open. The files show that different detectives reviewed the case every few years through the 1950s. Each time they noted that they would keep the case open and follow up, but no new evidence was uncovered. Gradually the case went cold.

In 2003, John Horner, a local historian at the Kansas City Public Library, fielded a call from someone out of state who said they had been helping to inventory the belongings of an elderly person who had recently died. Among them was a shoebox which turned out to be filled with newspaper clippings related to the case, as well as, according to them, one item mentioned in the newspaper stories. The caller identified neither themselves nor the item. Horner did not make this public until the conclusion of the second of two posts he made on the library's blog retelling the story in 2012.

== Theories ==
The absence of suspects in the case has inspired the rise of several theories. The telephone calls alleging that Ogletree was killed in retaliation for his broken engagement have provided support for that theory. Organized crime has also been considered, since the name "Don" can also be a title for a Mafia boss. Lastly, it has been suggested that "Don", whoever he was, killed Ogletree for some personal reason, either with the help of the "commercial woman" Blocher saw in the hotel late that night or by himself.

== See also ==
- Crime in Missouri
- List of unsolved murders (1900–1979)
- Lyle Stevik, assumed name of man (later privately identified) who committed suicide at Washington state motel in 2001
- Jennifer Fairgate, assumed name of woman (still unidentified), whose 1995 death in her Oslo hotel was ruled suicide
