= Mainstreet Theater =

Movie theater in Kansas City, Missouri

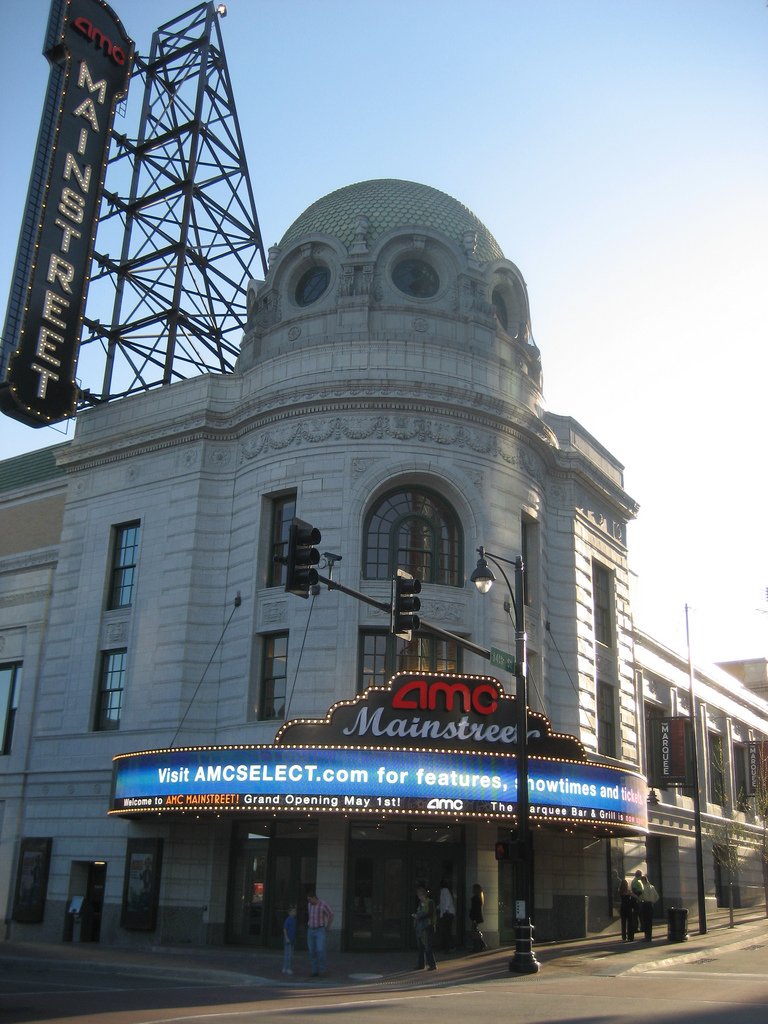
- Mainstreet Theater in the Power & Light District
- Interactive map of Mainstreet Theater
- Former names: RKO Missouri; Empire Theater
- Location: 1400 Main Street; Kansas City, Missouri
- Coordinates: 39.0971°N 94.5836°W
- Owner: The Cordish Companies
- Operator: Vacant
- Capacity: 3,200 originally
- Type: Movie theater

Construction
- Opened: October 30, 1921; Reopened May 1, 2009
- Renovated: 1967, 1980, 2008, 2021
- Reopened: 2021

The Mainstreet Theater, also commonly referred to as The Empire Theater, is a historic theater in the Power & Light District in downtown Kansas City, Missouri. The theater was added to the National Register of Historic Places in February 2007.

== History ==
=== Early history ===
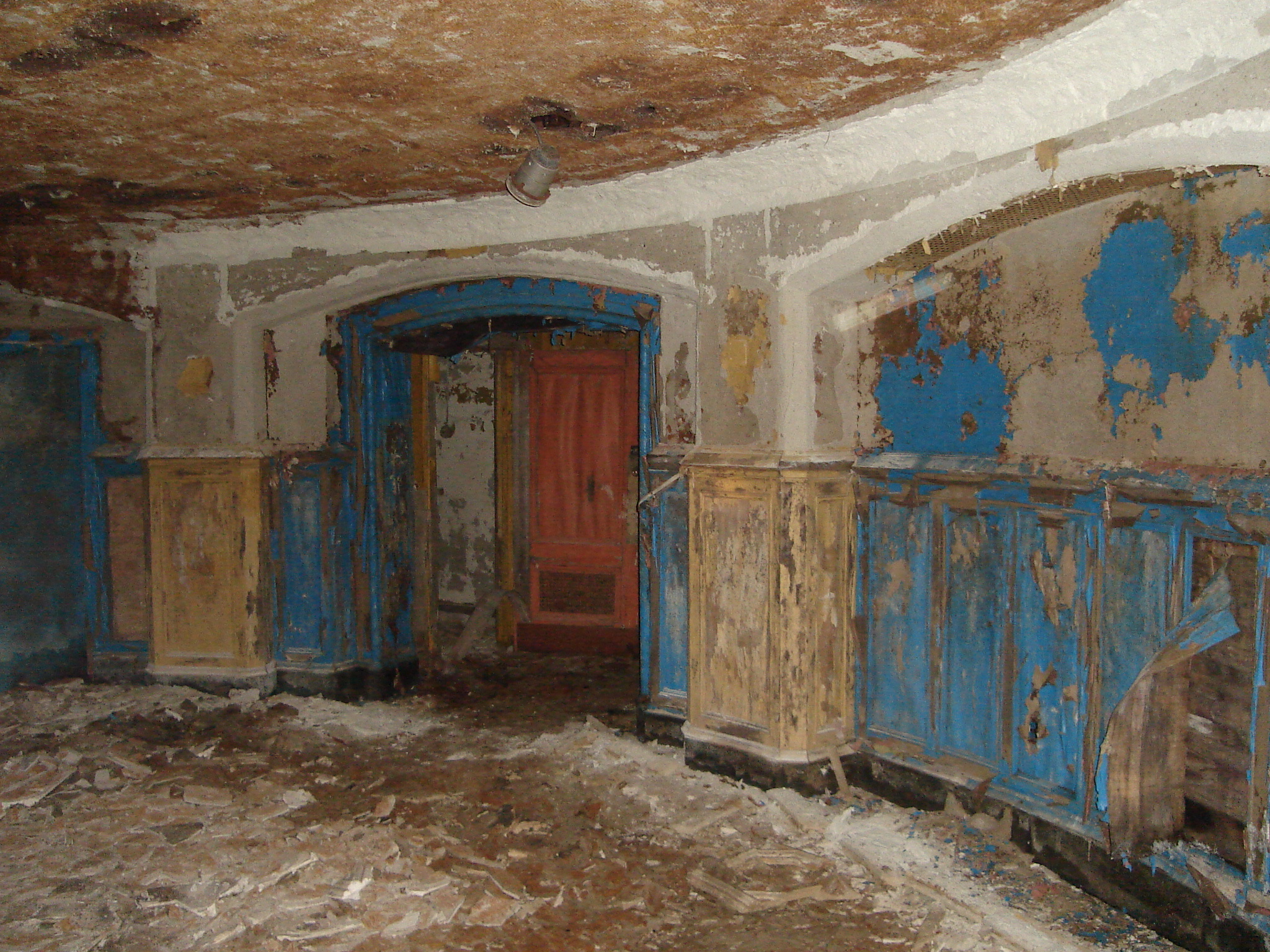
The basement lounge in 2005.

Designed by Rapp & Rapp, the 90,000-square-foot (8,400 m^{2}) theater opened on October 30, 1921 as the Mainstreet Missouri. The 3,200-seat theater was a popular vaudeville and movie house, and the only theater in Kansas City designed by Chicago firm Rapp and Rapp. The interior was designed in French Baroque style, and the exterior is a blend of neoclassical and French Second Empire. The lobby is topped by a dome encircled by circular windows. The Mainstreet Theater was the largest theater in Kansas City until the Midland Theatre opened in 1927.

The Mainstreet was the first theater in Kansas City to have a nursery for children whose parents were attending a show. Located in the basement and staffed by a trained nurse, it offered toys and games for older children and cribs for babies.

A tunnel connected the theater's lower level to the nearby President Hotel at 14th and Baltimore. Built to allow actors to enter the theater from their dressing rooms, it became infamous as a passage for bootleggers to escape police during Prohibition. The supposed tunnel is not shown on the Sanborn fire insurance map for 1939 (The Sanborn Map Co., New York, Kansas City 1939-1940 vol. 1, 1939, Sheet 34).

The theater also had space in the basement and sub-basement to keep animals for vaudeville shows. The space included an elephant cage, a pool for seals, and an elevator large and powerful enough to haul elephants to the stage. Noted performers such as Cab Calloway, Charlie Chaplin, Harry Lauder, the Marx Brothers, and Olsen and Johnson headlined at the vaudeville house. In the early 1920s, at the height of the theater's popularity, attendance averaged over 4,000 daily.

The Mainstreet Theater's name changed to the RKO Missouri Theater in April 1941. The RKO Missouri ran Cinerama three strip film.

- Mainstreet Theatre
- U.S. National Register of Historic Places
- The Mainstreet Theater as it originally appeared, prior to several name changes and removal of the large sign suspended from the roof

- Location within Missouri Location within the United States
- Location: 1400 Main St., Kansas City, Missouri
- Coordinates: 39.0971°N 94.5836°W
- Area: Less than one acre
- Built: 1921
- Built by: Thompson-Starrett Construction Co.
- Architect: C.W. Rapp and Geo. L. Rapp
- Architectural style: Beaux Arts
- NRHP reference No.: 07000043
- Added to NRHP: February 15, 2007

=== The AMC era ===
AMC Theatres, then known as Durwood Theatres, bought the theater in the late 1950s and reopened it in December 1960 as the Empire. The first film shown at the theater under the new name was Exodus. The new Empire's seating configuration was reduced to 1260 to accommodate modern amenities and technology.

Durwood replaced the Empire's three strip Cinerama with the seamless 70 mm film version. The 70 by 30-foot (9.1 m) Walker Hi Gain motion picture screen was designed to collapse, fold, and store on stage within two and a half hours to allow for quick conversion for live stage events. The stage curtain measured more than 120 feet (37 m) and claimed to be the world's largest. In keeping with Kansas City's reputation as the "City of Fountains", the Empire included decorative fountains in the box office area and at the main staircase. The prominent signage suspended from scaffolding attached to the building's roof during the "Mainstreet" and "RKO Missouri" eras was removed when Durwood converted the theater to the Empire. The Empire kept an organist until 1961 when there was a dispute with the musicians' union.

In 1967, the theater was split in two when a second theater was constructed in the former balcony of the original theater. In 1980 AMC converted the Empire into four theaters and it was known as Empire 4 Theaters. Two of the additional theaters were in the upper level where the original balcony once existed. The Empire stopped screening films and closed in 1985.

In 1972, as a protest against what it called "cultural prejudices", the Italian American Unification Council in Kansas City spent $2,500 to purchase all the seats of the premier showing of Francis Ford Coppola’s film The Godfather at the Empire. While the film played to an empty house, the Council sponsored a benefit dance down the street.

=== An uncertain future ===
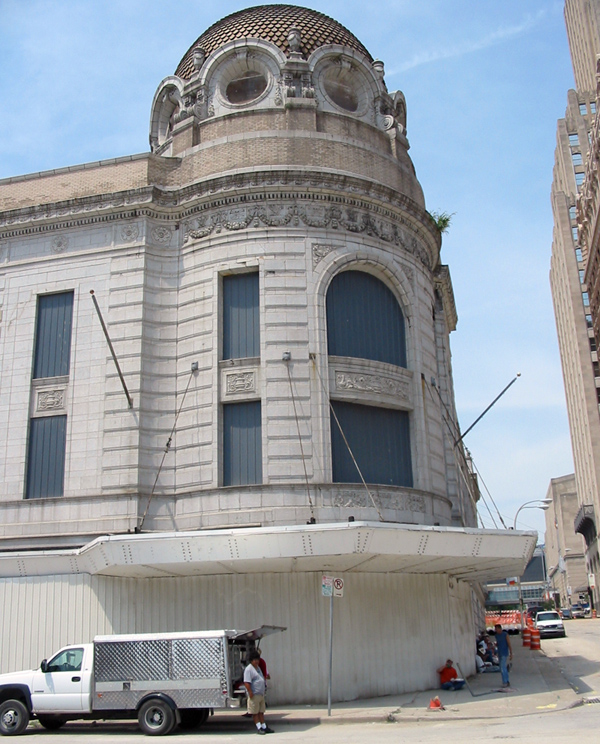
Construction workers involved in the early stages of Power & Light District construction seek shade under the marquee of the abandoned Empire Theater on a hot summer day in 2005. A glimpse of the trees growing from the roof can be seen to the right of the dome.

Prominent downtown landowner Larry Bridges purchased the Empire Theater in 1986 from Stan Durwood, then CEO of AMC Theatres. Between 1985 and 2005, the Empire was often at risk for demolition. Numerous efforts took place to prevent each demolition attempt. In 1986, actor and comedian George Burns joined the effort and wrote a letter to have the theater declared a historic landmark. Since the theater was not listed as a local landmark or listed on the National Register of Historic Places, there was not much legal protection to prevent the deteriorating structure's demolition.

Owner Larry Bridges expressed desire to raze the Empire several times and even obtained a pre-demolition inspection permit from the city in August 2003. Bridges planned to team with DST Realty to build a new headquarters for Kansas City Power & Light on the site. The City of Kansas City blocked the plan, which had called for saving the facade but demolishing the core structure of the Empire.

In 2004, the Kansas City Chapter of the American Institute of Architects compiled a list of 25 buildings in the central business district believed to be significant downtown landmarks "worthy of attention and reuse". The Empire Theater was listed as the most endangered building at the time: The building had fallen into such disrepair that bricks fell from the building and trees sprouted from the roof.

=== Redevelopment ===
The City of Kansas City reached an agreement to purchase the theater from Larry Bridges in late 2004 while it was acquiring properties for the future Power and Light District. In November 2005, the State of Missouri approved up to $938,538 in Brownfields Redevelopment Program remediation tax credits to help offset costs involved in the cleanup of asbestos at the theater. An estimated 200 dump-truck loads of asbestos and mold-covered debris were removed from the theater during the cleanup process. Power & Light District developer Cordish reached an agreement with AMC to form a joint venture, Midland-Empire Partners LLC, to redevelop the Empire Theater and the nearby Midland Theatre.

=== Reopening ===
The AMC Mainstreet Theater opened to the public under its original name as part of the Power & Light District on May 1, 2009, after a test period of playing second-run films for employees and invited guests beginning April 18, 2009. The theater also hosted the Kansas City Film Festival April 22–26, 2009. AMC stated the Mainstreet is its "flagship theater", spending $30 million on the renovation.

The renovated theater's ground floor has three standard auditoriums, while the upper level features "cinema suites" with reclining loungers, food trays, and a call button to summon a server. All auditoriums feature 4k digital projection and 11 channel sound, including overhead speakers and bass shakers mounted under the seats. AMC claims it is one of the world's most technologically advanced theater setups.

The lobby area features a restaurant called The Marquee which opened on Friday, March 27, 2009.

Early reports claimed the theater would feature "documentaries, independent, and foreign films", but upon opening the selection was limited to mainstream Hollywood films.

On May 26, 2009, the theater was awarded the "Dr. George Ehrlich Achievement in Preservation Award" by the Historic Kansas City Foundation.

=== Change of ownership ===
On June 4, 2012, it was announced Alamo Drafthouse Cinema would take over operations of the theater. As of June 25, 2012 Alamo Drafthouse had the Mainstreet theater listed on their web site and were selling tickets.

On or about March 3, 2021, the owners of the Kansas City Alamo Drafthouse announced they would be closing the location permanently due to the COVID-19 pandemic. In April 2021 (only a month later), B&B Theatres acquired the Mainstreet Theater, and it reopened at the end of September 2021. On March 1, 2026 in an email to members of B&B's loyalty program, the chain announced it was withdrawing its theater operations from the location once again leaving it vacant.
