= Hotel President =

Historic hotel in Kansas City, Missouri, US

- President Hotel
- U.S. National Register of Historic Places
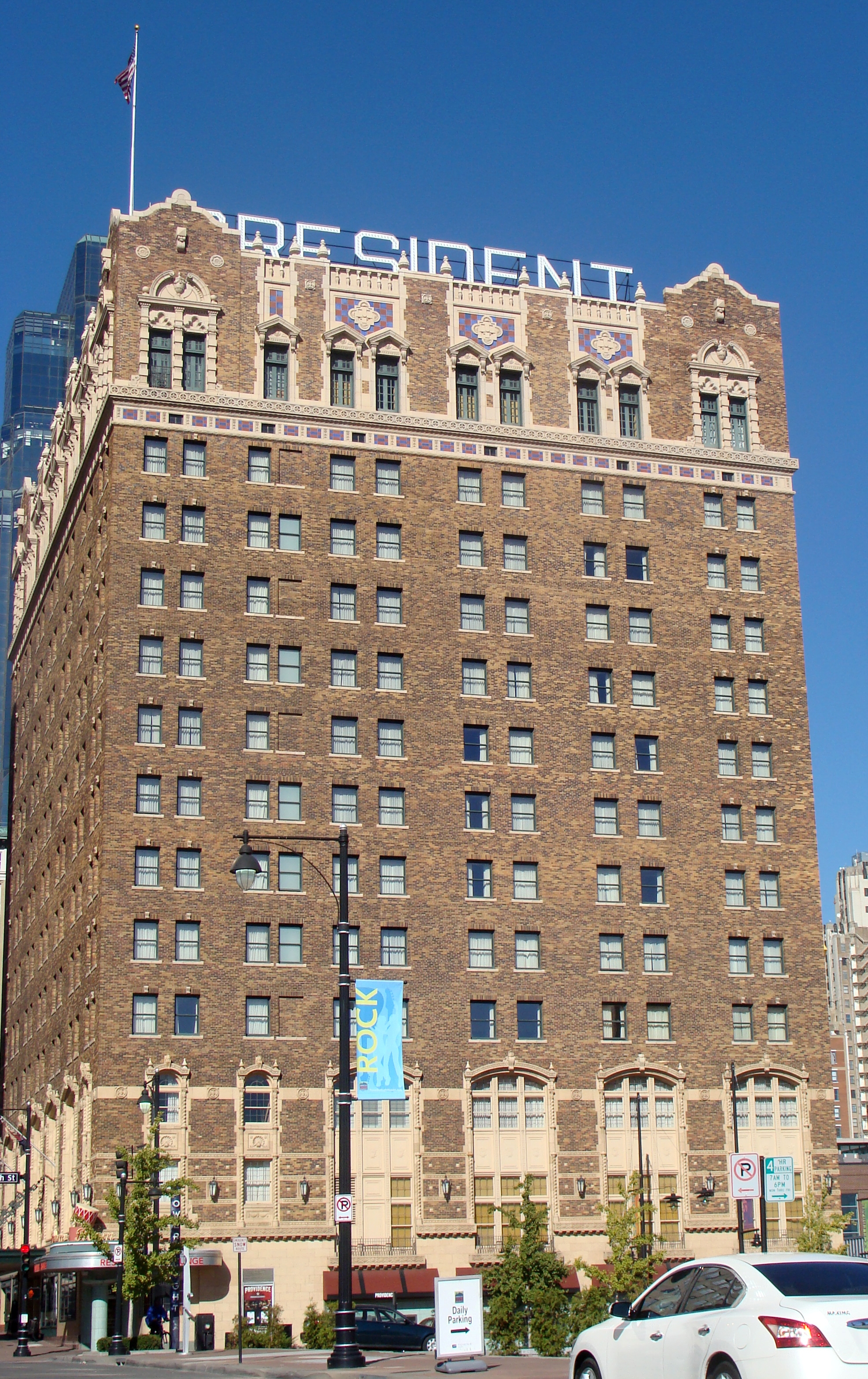

- Location within Missouri Location within the United States
- Location: 1327-1335 Baltimore Ave., Kansas City, Missouri, United States
- Coordinates: 39.097778°N 94.584167°W
- Area: 2 acres (0.81 ha)
- Built: 1925
- Architect: Shepard & Wiser; Siedhoff, George
- Architectural style: Jacobethan
- MPS: Hotels in Downtown Kansas City TR
- NRHP reference No.: 83001016
- Added to NRHP: August 08, 1983

The Hotel President, formerly the President Hotel, is a historic hotel in Kansas City, Missouri, United States. It is now operated as the Hilton President Kansas City by Jury Hotel Group of Overland Park Kansas, and is located at 1327-35 Baltimore Avenue.

== History ==
The President Hotel was built in 1925 by Niagara Falls businessman Frank A. Dudley and operated by the United Hotels Company. The hotel was built in a construction boom that also saw the erection of the nearby Mainstreet Theater, Midland Theatre, and Kansas City Power and Light Building.

In 1928, it was the headquarters for the 1928 Republican National Convention, which nominated Herbert Hoover for President. The hotel's Drum Room lounge attracted entertainers such as Frank Sinatra, Benny Goodman and Marilyn Maye.

At the beginning of 1935, a man using an assumed name at the time but later identified as Artemus Ogletree, was found severely assaulted in room 1046 after a two-day stay marked by odd behavior and interactions with a mysterious "Don"; he later died in the hospital. The case remains unsolved.

The hotel closed in 1980. It later underwent a $45.5 million restoration by developer Ron Jury and reopened in 2005 as the Hilton President Kansas City. The hotel is managed by Jury Hotel Group of Overland Park, Kansas. The hotel's General Manager is Philip Strnad.

Additional renovations were completed in 2017. These renovations included all guest rooms and meeting rooms. The Presidential Suite, and Reagan suites were renovated in 2019.

The President Hotel is the only hotel located in the Power and Light District.

The President is a franchise hotel of Hilton Hotels of Bethesda, Maryland.

The Hotel President was placed on the National Register of Historic Places in 1983.
