= Kayla Hahn =

American government official

Kayla Hahn is an American government official currently serving as chair of the Missouri Public Service Commission. She was appointed to the commission by governor Mike Parson.

== Education ==
Hahn holds a BS in political science from Missouri State University and a MA and PhD in political science from the University of Missouri-Columbia.

== Career ==
Hahn worked in the Missouri Senate Division of Research with roles assistant director and research analyst from 2013 until 2018. She joined Governor Parson's senior staff in 2018, leading the state COVID-19 response and serving on the Southern States Energy Board and the Midwestern Higher Education Commission. As policy advisor to Parson and Andrew Bailey, Hahn drafted options for limiting access to public records.

=== Missouri Public Service Commission ===
Parson appointed Hahn to the Missouri Public Service Commission on June 1, 2023, and she was named chair on February 6, 2024. In 2023, Hahn worked with her former colleagues in the governor's office to eliminate a proposed rule to report disconnections by ZIP code, a move that had been supported by consumer advocates and commission members for data analysis. Advocates involved in the process said that the governor's involvement in the decision was highly unusual for the commission. The Office of Public Counsel said that any costs associated with collecting zip code data would involve return on investment, including qualification for federal funds to assist customers against shut offs.

In early 2025, Hahn was criticized by consumer and environmental advocates for supporting legislation to allow Evergy and Ameren to charge residents for the costs of new plants before they are built. Tony Messenger described PSC chairman support for utilities charging "construction work in progress" fees to consumers as a "cruel joke." Hahn announced that the commission would open investigations into Liberty Utilities following complaints from Missouri residents during hearings on Liberty's requested rate increases.

In August 2025, the commission approved Evergy's request to build three new natural-gas processing plants and two solar power plants in Missouri, with costs exceeding $2.75 billion. Hahn expressed concerns over solar power as a variable renewable energy.

== Personal life ==
Hahn and her family live in Jefferson City, Missouri. Her husband, Jay Hahn, is a lobbyist for Worldwide Environmental Products.
