= GXP =

GXP may refer to:

- GxP a generalization of quality guidelines
- Great Plains Energy, an American utility holding company
- Tenchi Muyo! GXP, an anime
- Giga-X-Pipe, a standard of bottom bracket on bicycles
