= Aquila, Inc. =

Defunct electric utility company

- Type: Merged
- Genre: Energy Company
- Founded: 1902; 124 years ago
- Founder: Lemuel K. Green
- Defunct: 2007 (Certain assets acquired by Black Hills Corporation, others acquired by Great Plains Energy)
- Headquarters: Kansas City, Missouri, United States
- Key people: Richard C. Green (Chairman, President, CEO) Herman Cain (Director 1992-2008)
- Revenue: US$ 1,369 Million (2006)
- Operating income: US$ ▼-190.1 Million (2006)
- Net income: US$ 23.9 Million (2006)
- Total assets: US$ 874.0 Million (2006)
- Total equity: US$ 1,306.1 Million (2006)
- Website: blackhillsenergy.com

Aquila, Inc. was an electricity and natural gas distribution network headquartered in Kansas City, Missouri in the United States. The company also owned and operated power generation assets. It previously operated under the name UtiliCorp United, Inc. The company at one time ranked #33 on the Fortune 500 list.

On February 6, 2007, the company announced plans for a merger valued at $1.7 billion to become a wholly owned subsidiary of Great Plains Energy. In conjunction with the merger Black Hills Corporation is to acquire its Colorado electric utility and the Colorado, Iowa, Kansas, and Nebraska gas utilities for $940 million. The merger closed on July 14, 2008, and Aquila now operates under the name Black Hills Energy.

== History ==
=== Solomon Valley Milling Company ===
Aquila has its roots in the Solomon Valley Milling Company founded in 1902 by Lemuel K. Green in Osborne, Kansas. The steam mill used to process flour and Green discovered he could sell electricity.

In 1908 sold the mill and bought the H. M. Spalding Electric Light Plant in Concordia, Kansas. Prior to Green's purchase the plant generated power only dawn to midnight and was closed on Sundays. Green bought power from another flour mill and began selling power to neighboring towns.

=== Green Power & Light Company ===
In 1916 he sold the plant to the A.E. Fitkin & Company in New York City for $550,000. He then bought the Reeder Light, Ice & Fuel Company in Pleasant Hill, Missouri and renamed the company Green Power & Light Company. He then built Baldwin Lake which was used for hydroelectric power as well as provide water for the community.

=== West Missouri Power Company ===
In 1922 looking to expand with a generating plant at Clinton, Missouri he took the company public under the name West Missouri Power Company. Its chief rival in the Kansas City metropolitan area was Kansas City Power & Light. The company continued to expand through southwest Missouri.

=== Missouri Public Service Company ===
In 1926 he sold it to the Fitkin Group again which merged with the Missouri Public Service Company. Green retired to Escondido, California where bought a 2,000-acre (8.1 km^{2}) orange grove. He died in 1930. The Public Utilities Act of 1935 broke up utilities. Green's son Ralph Green bought controlling interest in Missouri Public Service. Green was to bring in Middle West Corporation, Missouri Gas & Electric Service Company and City Light and Traction Company of Sedalia, Missouri.

=== UtiliCorp United Inc. ===
Ralph Green died in 1962 and his son Richard Green took the helm. Richard Green, Jr. took over in 1982. The latest Green looked to expand it beyond its Missouri base and it was renamed UtiliCorp United Inc. in 1985. It bought People's Natural Gas, Northern Minnesota Utilities, West Virginia Power, West Kootenay Power and Light in British Columbia, and Michigan Gas Utilities. In 1989 it assigned its unregulated gas operations to a newly created subsidiary, Aquila Energy Corp. The acquisitions were done by issuing stock and reducing Green family control.

In 1991, Centel sold its electric utility holdings in Kansas and Colorado to UtiliCorp for $345 million which operated under the name WestPlains Energy. Before then, Centel in Colorado was known as Southern Colorado Power Company which was later changed to Centel Electric-Southern Colorado Power Division. Centel in Kansas was previously Western Power and Gas which was changed to Centel Electric-Western Power Division.

In 1992 the company entered into a joint venture to distribute and market natural gas in the United Kingdom. From 1995 to 2000 it bought interest in utilities in New Zealand and Australia. In some markets Utilicorp placed electric and phone bills on the same bill. West Virginia Power was sold to Allegheny Energy in 1999, becoming part of its Monongahela Power subsidiary.

=== Aquila, Inc. ===
In 2001 UtiliCorp spun off Aquila but then bought it back in 2002 and then renamed the entire corporation Aquila, Inc.

Aquila's stock price peaked at $37.55 in May 2001 and it ranked #33 on the Fortune 500. The stock plummeted to $6.75 in July 2002 in the wake of the Enron scandal which had called into question business practices of all electric utilities.

In 2004 five lawsuits were filed in federal court alleging that Aquila's board of directors steered employees into heavily investing their retirement savings in company stock. On Jan. 26, 2005, these suits were folded into a single class action alleging top company officials violated the federal Employee Retirement Income Security Act requiring that employers manage employees retirement programs responsibly. The company settled the case for $10.5 million in April 2007. 66,000 of the company's customers in Missouri lost power for several days in the Mid-December 2007 North American Winter storms.

The company began selling its assets and dropped to 891 on the Fortune list in 2007. In 2007 its electric assets in northwest Missouri were acquired by its historic rival Kansas City Power & Light (via its new parent Great Plains Energy) for $1.7 billion. Its gas properties, as well as its electric service area in southeastern Colorado (including Pueblo), were acquired by Black Hills Corporation.

In 2006, Aquila Networks sold the Kansas electric properties to Mid-Kansas Electric Company (a cooperative). The Mid-Kansas Electric Company consists of six electric cooperatives: Lane-Scott Electric Cooperative, Inc. (Dighton, Kansas|Dighton), Prairie Land Electric Cooperative, Inc. (Norton), Pioneer Electric Cooperative, Inc. (Ulysses) (the old Aquila territory for Pioneer is operating as Southern Pioneer Electric Company), Victory Electric Cooperative Association, Inc. (Dodge City), Western Cooperative Electric Association (WaKeeney) and Wheatland Electric Cooperative, Inc. (Scott City) The Kansas gas operations were sold to Empire District Electric Company. In 2008, the Colorado electric properties were acquired by Black Hills Corporation and was renamed Black Hills Energy.

Mid-Kansas Electric Company Communities formerly served by Aquila Networks:

Lane-Scott Electric Cooperative: Ness City

Prairie Land Electric Cooperative: Phillipsburg, Smith Center

Southern Pioneer Electric Company Coldwater, Liberal, Medicine Lodge

Victory Electric Cooperative Association: Dodge City

Western Cooperative Electric: Ellsworth, Lincoln

Wheatland Electric Cooperative: Great Bend, Harper
