= Lawrence Energy Center =

Lawrence Energy Centre
- Country: United States
- Coordinates: 38°58′18″N 95°14′07″W

Power generation
- Nameplate capacity: 517 MW

Lawrence Energy Center is an old coal-fired power plant in Kansas, owned by Evergy. Evergy has a target of net zero carbon emissions by 2045, but no date has been set to stop burning coal as the company is expecting increased demand from data centers. However, part of the plant was closed in 2015. The company is dealing with ash pond pollutants.
