= Great Plains Energy =

Former energy holding company based in Kansas City

Great Plains Energy Incorporated
- Type: Public
- Traded as: NYSE: GXP
- Industry: Electric utility
- Founded: 1882
- Founder: Edwin Ruthven Weeks, Joseph S. Chick, L.R. Moore, William Holmes
- Fate: Merged with Westar Energy
- Headquarters: Kansas City, Missouri, United States
- Key people: Terry Bassham (President and CEO/Chairman)
- Revenue: ▲US$2.568 billion (2014)
- Operating income: ▼US$534.5 Million (2014)
- Net income: ▼US$242.8 Million (2014)
- Number of employees: 2,935 (2014)
- Subsidiaries: Kansas City Power & Light,(KLT Inc.); Innovative Energy Consultants Inc. (IEC); Great Plains Energy Services Incorporated
- Website: www.evergyinc.com

Great Plains Energy Incorporated was a holding company based in Kansas City, Missouri that owned electric utility Kansas City Power and Light Company and Strategic Energy, LLC, an energy management company.

KCP&L established the holding company on October 1, 2001.

Great Plains acquired Aquila, Inc. in July, 2008.

In 2014, it ranked #855 on the Fortune 1000 list.

== Merger with Westar ==
In 2016, Great Plains and Westar Energy announced merger plans, but this proposed merger was rejected by Kansas Corporation Commission utility regulators as unfavorable to Kansas consumers. A new merger plan with Westar was announced in 2017. As of May 24, 2018, this merger has been approved by both the Missouri Public Service Commission and Kansas regulators, with the combined company to be named Evergy.

On October 7, 2019, the two operating companies officially changed names and rebranded to Evergy in the communities they serve.
