= Jeffrey Energy Center =

Coal-fired power plant located in Pottawatomie County, Kansas

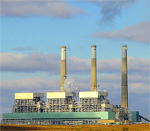
- Country: United States
- Location: Pottawatomie County, Kansas
- Coordinates: 39°17′10″N 96°07′01″W
- Status: Operational
- Owners: Evergy, Inc. Aquila Corp

Thermal power station
- Primary fuel: Sub-bituminous coal

Power generation
- Nameplate capacity: 2.4 GW

Jeffrey Energy Center (Jeffrey EC) is a sub-bituminous coal-fired power plant located in Emmett Township, Pottawatomie County, seven miles (11 km) northwest of St. Marys, Kansas. Jeffrey EC is jointly owned by Evergy, Inc. and Aquila Corp., both wholly owned subsidiaries of Evergy, Inc., Kansas City, Missouri. Jeffrey EC is composed of three separate 800-MW units providing a name-plate energy center capacity of 2.4 gigawatts. Unit 1 began operation in 1978, unit 2 in 1980 and unit 3 in 1983.

Jeffrey EC is a typical coal-fired energy center. Its primary mission is to convert the chemical energy available from its Wyoming Powder River Basin sub-bituminous coal supply into electric energy.

== History ==
Jeffrey EC came into operation during the late 1970s in the wake of an energy crisis created by a quadrupling of world oil prices. Its inauguration in July, 1978 was heralded with a visit by Vice President Walter Mondale praising its use of domestic coal reserves at a time when many power stations were still using imported oil. The opening ceremonies included a performance by the US Army Golden Knights parachute team, and the arrival of a special train carrying company officials and state dignitaries from Topeka, Kansas.

The center was originally designed for four generating units, but was scaled back when the anticipated growth in demand for electricity did not materialize.

The Siemens-Allis steam turbines and generators were imported from Germany. The unit 2 intermediate pressure turbine had to be substituted by the unit 3 turbine when the original unit was lost on a ship that sunk while crossing the Atlantic Ocean.

As of December, 2007, Foundation Coal had shipped approximately 220 million tons of Powder River Basin Coal to Jeffrey Energy Center.

In April, 2021, Evergy stated that they planned to decommission unit 3 in 2030.

== Operation ==
Coal is delivered to Jeffrey EC by unit trains. Each unit train contains about 110 cars carrying 100 tons of coal per car, constructed of aluminum to conserve weight, and is approximately 1 mile (1.6 km) long.

Jeffrey EC burns the coal delivered by about 11 miles (18 km) of coal train cars each week. The heating value of this coal is about 8,400 BTU/lb (19.5 MJ/kg) and at full load Jeffrey EC burns about 3,000,000 pounds (1,400 metric tons) of coal per hour.

Jeffrey EC has the capacity to generate 2,400 MW of electrical power.

Jeffrey EC is not located close to any large bodies of natural water. Its cooling water supply comes from the Kansas River and two nearby wells.

The overall thermal efficiency of the energy conversion is about 33%. About 1/3 of the coal's chemical energy is converted to electric energy. The remaining 2/3 of the energy is rejected to the environment via cooling water evaporated as low-grade waste heat with poor thermodynamic availability. The waste heat comes from evaporation of cooling water after it is used to condense the highly purified, low temperature steam that exits the turbines below atmospheric pressure after driving the electric power generator. The condensed steam is then recirculated (pumped) back to the high pressure boiler for re-use.

Other steam generating (nuclear, gas, coal, geothermal, and solar furnace) energy centers, like Jeffrey, operate their steam plant on the Rankine cycle.

According to Moyers and Company web site as of September 18, 2013 Jeffrey EC ranked 12th of the 50 dirtiest American power plants and generated 14.7 million metric tons of carbon dioxide emissions in 2011.

As of 2026, it is estimated that the plant causes 20 deaths per year due to soot and smog pollution.

== See also ==
- List of largest power stations in the United States
