= La Cygne Coal Plant =

Coal-fired power plant in the United States

La Cygne Generating Station
- Country: United States
- Location: La Cygne, Linn County, Kansas, United States
- Coordinates: 38°20′53″N 94°38′44″W
- Status: Operational
- Owner: Evergy
- Operator: Evergy

Thermal power station
- Primary fuel: Sub-bituminous coal

Power generation
- Units operational: 2 x 1578 MW

La Cygne Coal Plant is a coal-fired power plant in the town of La Cygne, Kansas in the United States, near Lake La Cygne.

The plant was commissioned in 1973, and is currently co-owned by Evergy Metro and Westar Energy. The plant is located in Kansas' Southeastern Coal Field region, encompassing the counties of Linn, Crawford, and Cherokee, which historically have been the center of Kansas coal production. However, at present, coal is imported from the Powder River Basin in Wyoming. It operates as a steam turbine ran plant, running entirely on coal.

The plant is set to shut down in 2039 as part of a broader coal phase out.

== Environmental issues ==
Concerns have been raised about the plant's environmental impact over the years.

In 1974, just a year after the plant's opening, populations of Ceriodaphnia in Lake La Cygne were found to have declined by 41% due to the plant's presence.

In 1997, the Kansas City metropolitan area was classified as in "nonattainment" with federal air pollution standards due to high presence of nitrogen oxide in the atmosphere, caused by the nearby La Cygne Coal Plant.

In recent years, concerns have been raised about the plant's coal ash dumps. Dumping of coal ash from the plant into the local rivers and lakes has led to contamination of the area's groundwater, introducing toxic chemicals into the local water supply at levels well above national standards for safe drinking water.

A study of the groundwater near La Cygne found metals antimony, boron, cobalt, and particularly high levels of lithium and sulfate contaminating the water. La Cygne is estimated to have dumped 23 million cubic yards of coal ash across three ponds and landfills in the area over the years. This is more than ash dumped any other coal plant in Kansas.

Since 2023, the Environmental Protection Agency has increased efforts to regulate coal plants and prevent ash dumps. Since this initiative, there has been no reported dumps from La Cygne, as of March 2026.

As of 2026, it is estimated that the plant causes 17 deaths per year due to soot and smog pollution.

== Planned shutdown ==
In 2021, Evergy announced it would close one of the two coal-powered units at La Cygne in 2032, with the eventual closing of all coal-powered units coming in 2039. Evergy further detailed their plan in a 2024 report, wherein it was revealed that initial evaluations and dewatering of the plant have been ongoing since September 2020. This is part of a larger directive from Evergy to shut down all their coal plants and shift towards renewable energy over the next two decades, with the first shutdowns having occurred in 2023.

Reactions to the shutdown were mixed. Environmental group Sierra Club claimed after the announcement that Evergy had "lagged far behind other utilities" in its shutdown of coal, arguing 2039 was too far into the future. However, Evergy spokesman Chuck Caisley argued Evergy was "ahead of the national average and ahead of most utilities in the amount of carbon reduction that we’ll be able to do.
