= Kansas City Power and Light Building =

Historic building in Kansas City

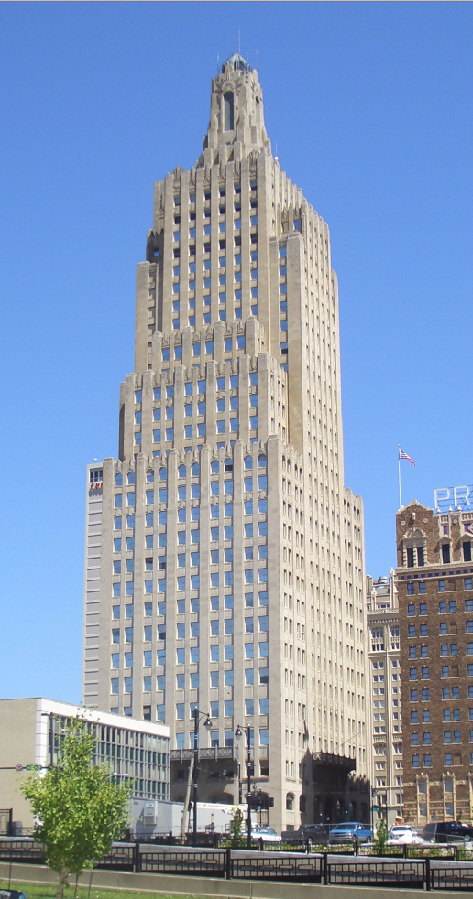
- View of the southeast
- Interactive map of the Kansas City Power and Light Building area
- Alternative names: KCP&L Building; Power and Light Building

General information
- Status: Completed
- Type: Commercial offices originally, now luxury apartments and upscale event space
- Location: 1330 Baltimore Ave; Kansas City; MO 64105; United States
- Coordinates: 39.09751°N 94.584743°W
- Construction started: 1930; 96 years ago
- Completed: 1931; 95 years ago
- Owner: NorthPoint Development

Height
- Roof: 481 ft (147 m)

Technical details
- Floor count: 34 (+2 below-grade)
- Floor area: 230,000 sq ft (21,000 m^{2})
- Lifts/elevators: 7

Design and construction
- Architect: Hoit, Price & Barnes
- Developer: Kansas City Power and Light
- Main contractor: Swenson Construction Company

References
- Kansas City Power and Light Company Building
- U.S. National Register of Historic Places
- Location within Missouri Location within the United States
- Built: 1930; 96 years ago
- Architectural style: Art Deco
- NRHP reference No.: 88001852
- Added to NRHP: January 9, 2002; 24 years ago

The Kansas City Power and Light Building (also called the KCP&L Building and the Power and Light Building) is a landmark skyscraper located in Downtown Kansas City, Missouri. It was constructed by Kansas City Power and Light President and Edison Pioneer, Joseph F. Porter in 1931 as a way to promote new jobs in Downtown Kansas City. Since then, the Art Deco building has been a prominent part of Kansas City's skyline. The structure was the tallest building west of the Mississippi River upon its completion after succeeding the Smith Tower until the completion of the Space Needle in 1962. The east façade of the building faces the Power & Light District (which bears its name), and the building's iconic lantern appears on promotional materials and signage for the district and even Kansas City as a whole.

== History ==
The building was designed by the Kansas City architecture firm of Hoit, Price and Barnes, which also designed Municipal Auditorium and 909 Walnut. Rumor for years said the original plans included a twin building to be paired on the immediate west side of the building, but the second tower was never built due to the effects of the Great Depression on local real estate prices. This was debunked in 2013 by local architect Dan Hicks who reviewed plans and interviewed Clarence Kivett, a well known architect working for Hoit, Price and Barnes at the time of the building design. The west side of the building has no windows because it was meant to be a firewall if there was a structure building built immediately next to it, plus the elevator shafts are along that side of the building. The Power and Light Building, at 34 stories, was Missouri's tallest habitable structure from 1931 until the completion of One U.S. Bank Plaza in St. Louis in 1976.

Kansas City Power & Light Co. left the building in 1991.

In 2010 Kansas City selected the area adjacent to the Power and Light Building as a potential location for a hotel and convention center, to fulfill a need for the city. However, the city only received two proposals from property developers for a convention hotel at the site. The city considered the two proposals it received in 2011 as lackluster and were considering reopening the bidding process for a different downtown location.

The building lost its last tenant, BNIM, a Kansas City-based architecture and planning firm, on September 2, 2014. The 36-story Power & Light building began a conversion into an apartment tower in October 2014. The project, led by NorthPoint Development of Riverside, which has now been completed includes 210 apartments in the historic tower, with an additional 81 units constructed wrapping around and built above a new 500 stall parking garage serving the building. The building lobby was converted into a premier event space holding up to 500 guests. The conversion made it Missouri's tallest residential-only building.

== Lighting ==
The Kansas City Power and Light Building is crowned by an ornate Art Deco lantern, which features prismatic glass panels concealing red-orange lights that glow each evening at sunset. Originally, each recessed setback of the building also held multicolor flickering flood lights that dazzled nighttime viewers with the impression of blazing flames. Today, LED floodlights rotate through an abundance of colors and dazzle onlookers.

== Gallery ==
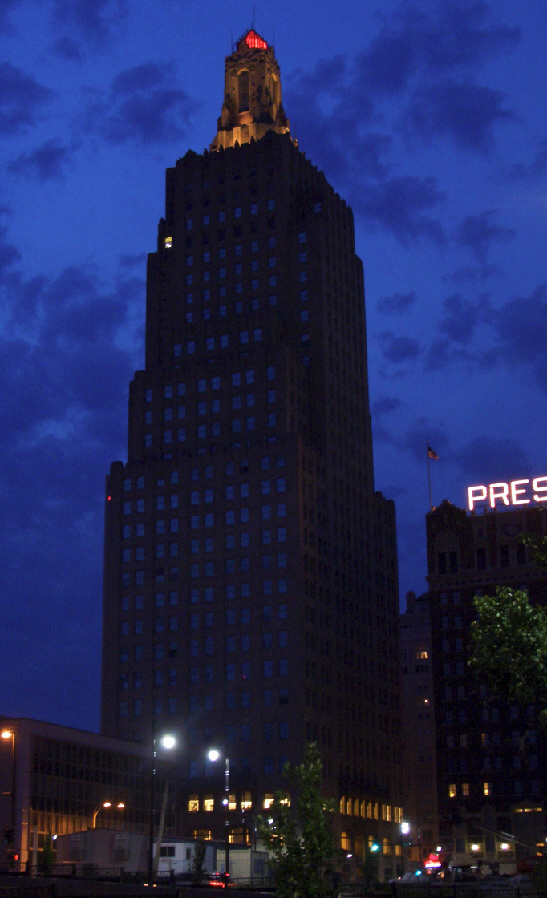
Power & Light Building at night

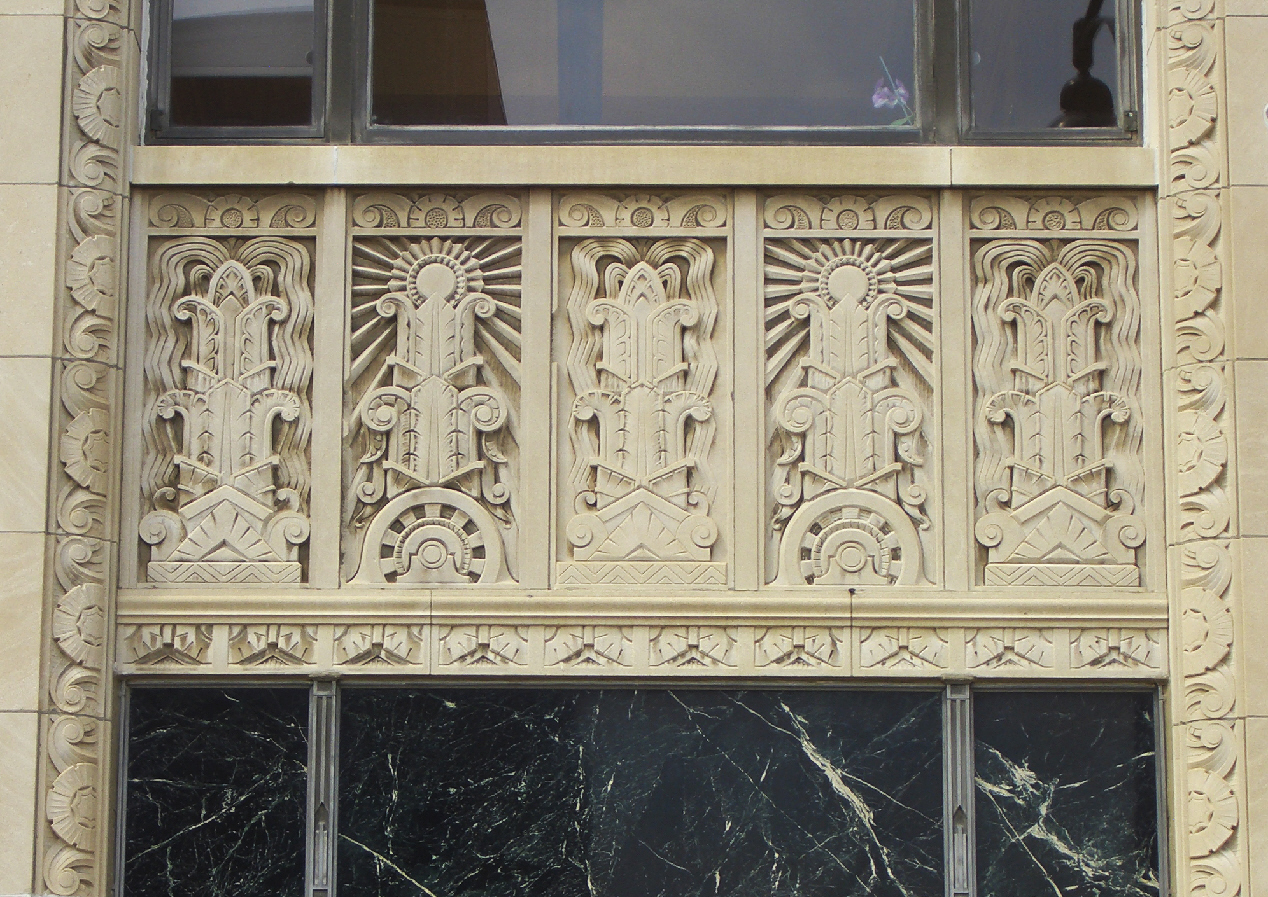
Exterior detail

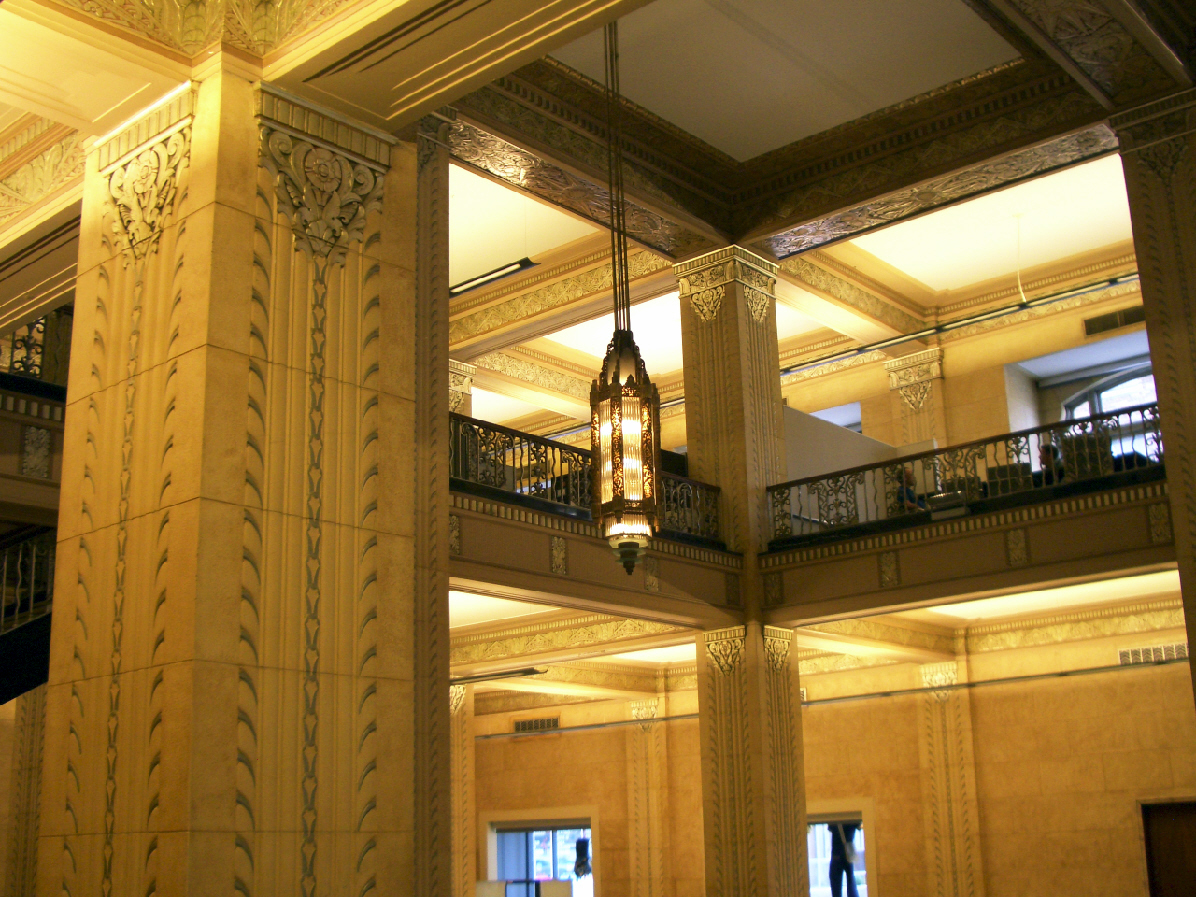
Main floor office

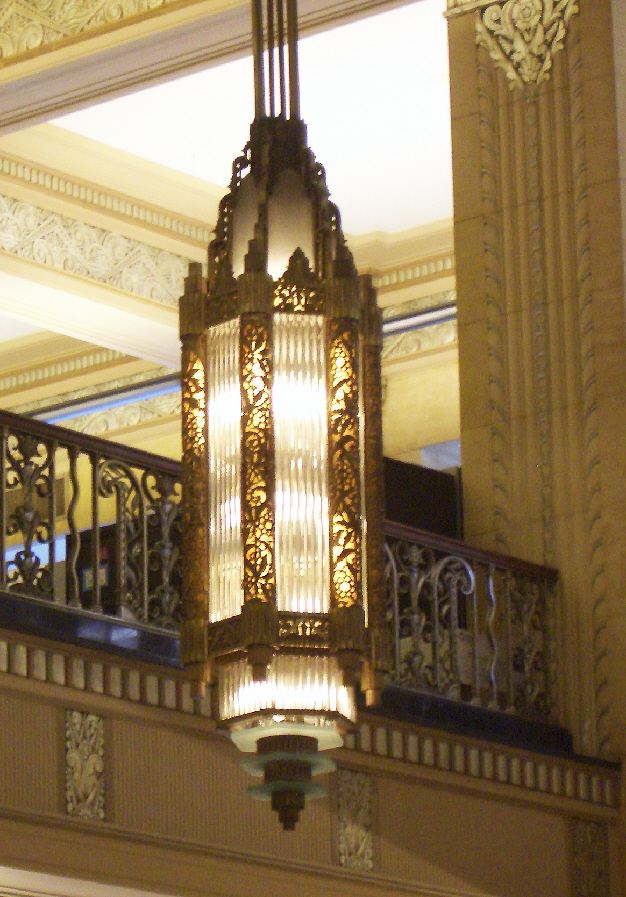
Light fixture,
main floor office

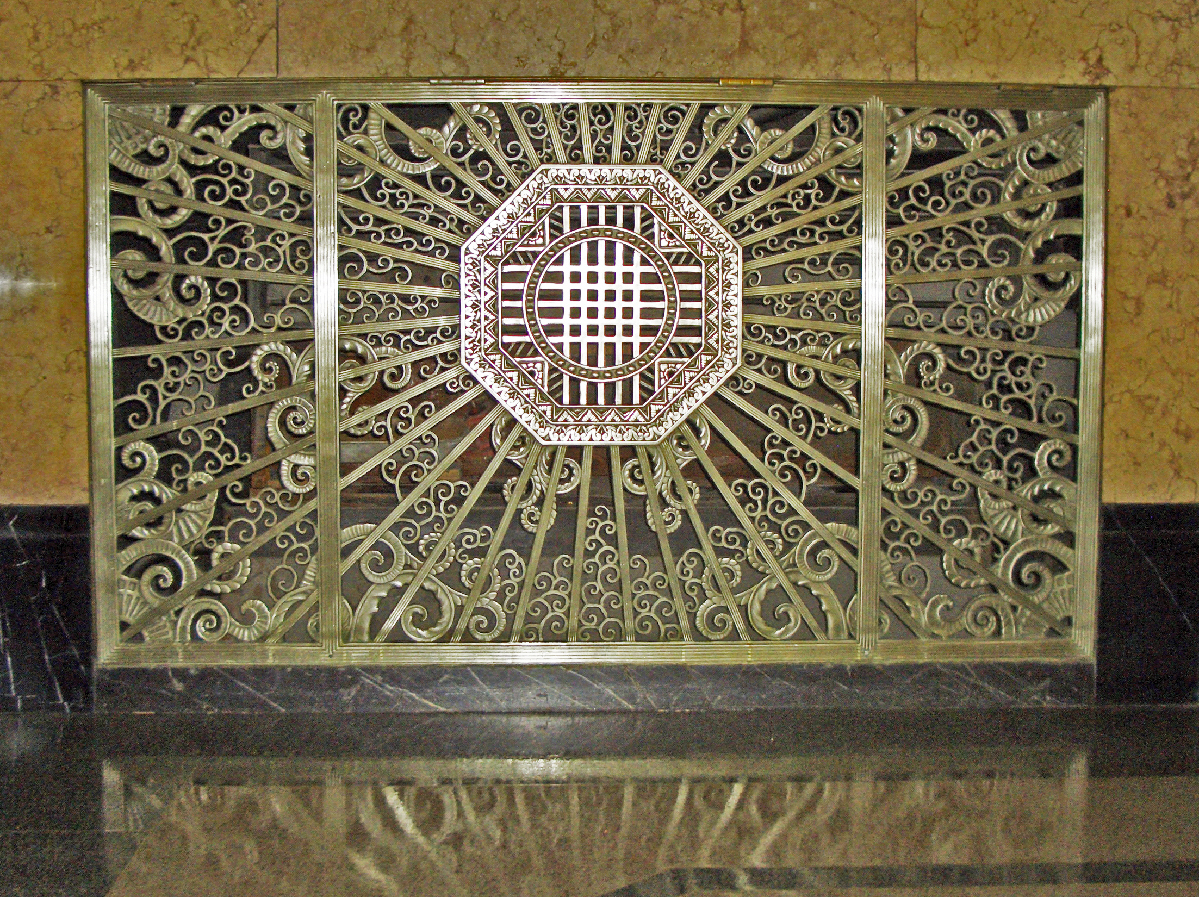
Air vent,
main floor lobby

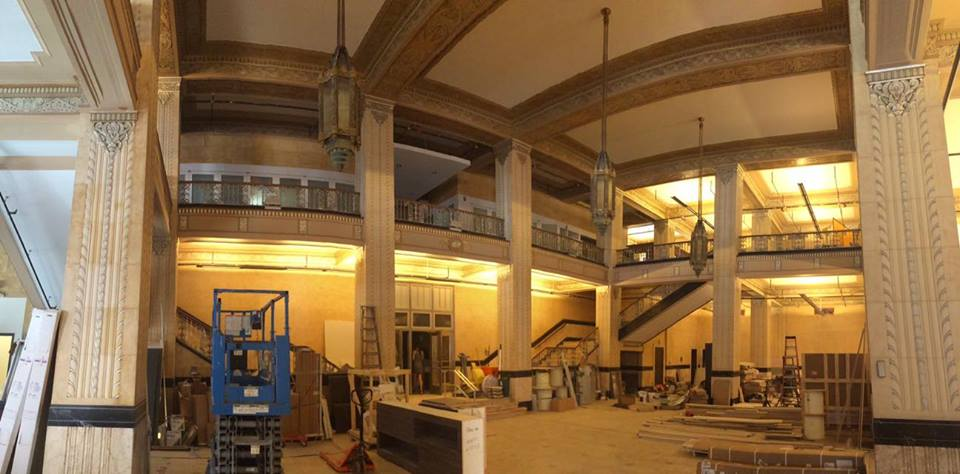
Power and Light lobby under renovation during its transformation into an residential apartment building

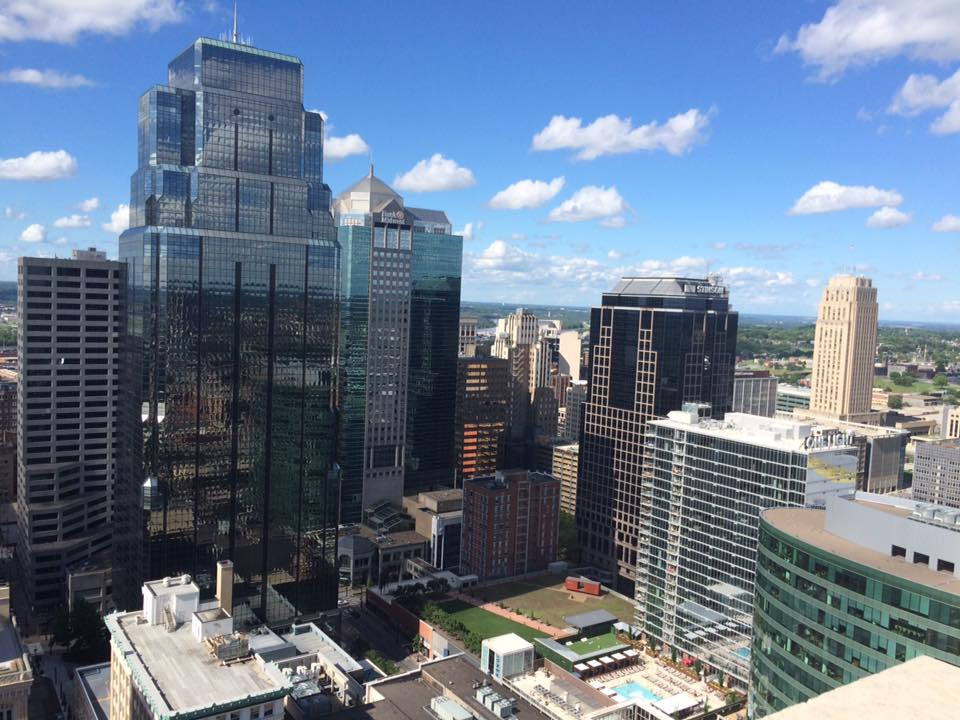
View of downtown Kansas City from Power and Light's new apartment units

== See also ==
- Tallest buildings in Kansas City
- National Register of Historic Places listings in Downtown Kansas City, Missouri
