= Kansas Corporation Commission =

The Kansas Corporation Commission (KCC) is the public utilities commission of the state of Kansas run by three Commissioners appointed by the Governor with the approval of the Senate. The Commission has the responsibility of ensuring that natural gas, electricity, telephone, and transportation vendors provide safe, adequate, and reliable services at reasonable rates. Notwithstanding the commission's name, it does not charter corporations; that function is performed by the office of the Secretary of State.

The authority of the KCC is derived from KSA 74-601 to 74-631. The Corporation Commissioners, as of July 2025, are Andrew J. French (who is the current chair), Dwight D. Keen, and Annie Kuether.

== History ==
The Kansas Commission was one of the first state regulatory bodies in the nation, established as the Railroad Commission in 1883 by the Kansas Legislature. The Railroad Commission had power and authority to regulate steam-operated railroads, express companies, sleeping car companies, and inter-company electric lines. The members were elected by a popular vote.

In 1911, the Kansas Legislature created a three-member Public Utilities Commission to regulate telegraph and telephone companies, pipeline companies, common carriers, water, electric, gas, and all power companies with the exception of those owned by municipalities. Members of this commission were appointed by the Governor.

The present regulatory body, The State Corporation Commission of the State of Kansas was established by the Legislature in 1933. Its jurisdiction was extended to include the regulation of motor carriers, gas conservation, and supervision of plugging abandoned wells to protect fresh and usable water from pollution.
