= Missouri Public Service Commission =

Public Service Commission overview
- Jurisdiction: Missouri
- Public Service Commission executive: Chairman, Kayla Hahn
- Website: Missouri Public Service Commission Website

The Missouri Public Service Commission (PSC) regulates investor-owned telephone, electric, natural gas, steam, water, and sewer utilities in the state of Missouri, as well as regulating manufacturer and retail sales of new and used manufactured homes and modular units.

The PSC commissioners are appointed by the Governor of Missouri. The current commissioners, as of 2025, are Chairman Kayla Hahn, Maida J. Coleman, Glen Kolkmeyer, and John P. Mitchell.

== History ==
=== Utility costs ===
In 1976, Missouri voted to prohibit construction works in progress charges, motivated by the financial burdens of the Callaway Nuclear Generating Station. Previous law allowed costs for new and future power plant manufacturing to factor into consumer fees. In 2025, Mike Kehoe signed a law to restore construction works in progress charges and adding tariffs, to be determined by PSC, on users requiring 100MW or more of energy.

=== Natural gas ===
In 2025, the federal government took over natural gas pipeline regulation in Missouri due to noncompliance with federal requirements.
