= Kansas City Power & Light District =

District in downtown Kansas City, Missouri

Power & Light District
- Interactive map of Power & Light District
- Location: 50 East 13th Street; Suite 200; Kansas City, Missouri 64106
- Coordinates: 39°05′52″N 94°34′56″W
- Owner: The Cordish Companies
- Capacity: nine city block area
- Type: Mixed-use retail, entertainment, office, and residential development

Construction
- Built: 2005 - 2008
- Opened: First tenant opened November 9, 2007

Website
- powerandlightdistrict.com

The Kansas City Power & Light District (sometimes referred to as KC P&L) is a dining, shopping, office, and entertainment district in Downtown Kansas City, Missouri, United States, developed by The Cordish Companies of Baltimore, Maryland, and designed by Beyer Blinder Belle and 360 Architecture. The district comprises nine blocks on the south side of the downtown loop. It is located between Baltimore Avenue to the west, Grand Boulevard to the east, 12th Street to the north, and Interstate 670 to the south. The $850 million mixed use district is one of the largest development projects in the Midwestern United States, and is anchored by the renovated Midland Theatre, Alamo Drafthouse Mainstreet Cinema, and the world headquarters of H&R Block. The district was originally projected to generate enough tax revenue to pay for the bonds that were issued to finance it, but the city has instead relied on its general fund and refinancing to make debt payments.

In 2009, the Power & Light District was the recipient of the Urban Land Institute Award of Excellence for its impact on the revitalization of downtown Kansas City.

== Location ==
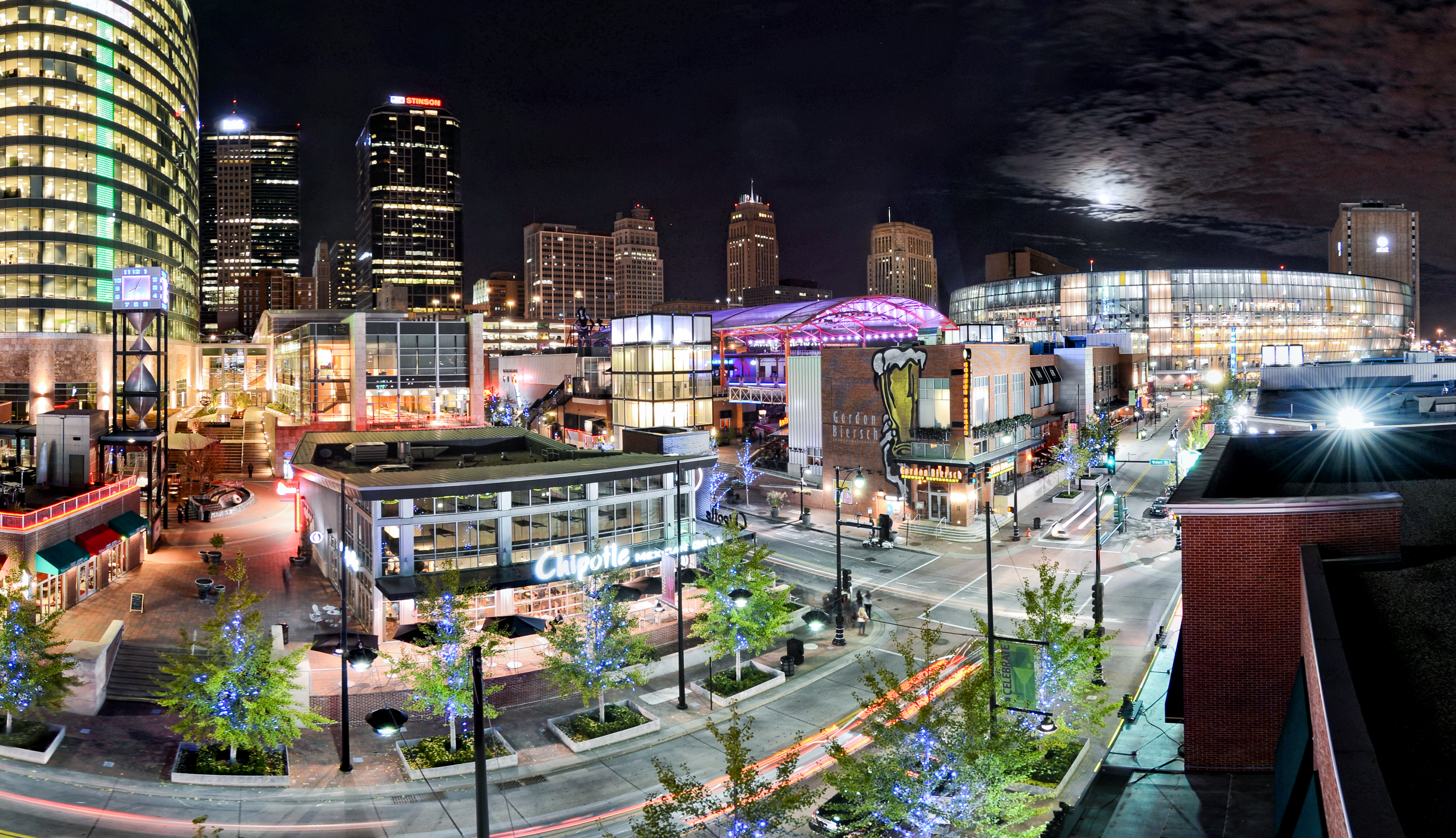
Power & Light District in Kansas City, MO

The Power & Light District is immediately to the west of the T-Mobile Center. The district was named after the art deco Kansas City Power and Light Building. The headquarters of the Kansas City Power & Light Company (a subsidiary of Great Plains Energy) is located on the northern side of the district. A one-block entertainment area within the district is called Kansas City Live!, which contains two floors of bars and restaurants, and a large, partially enclosed courtyard and concert venue.

== Kansas City Live! ==
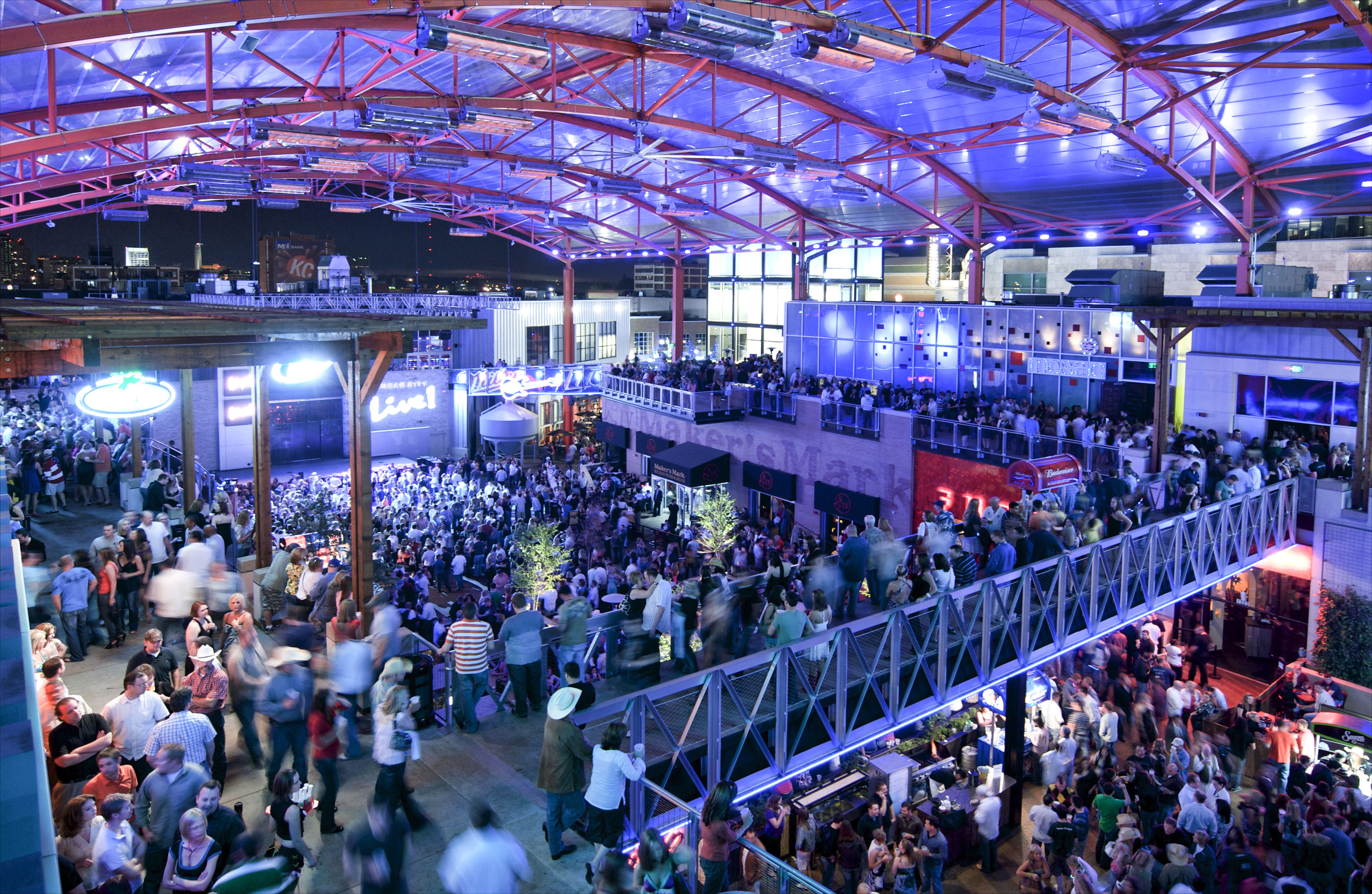
The interior of the Kansas City Live! block of the Power & Light District features the stage.

At the center of the Power & Light District is Kansas City Live!, a one block area devoted to live music and entertainment venues. It hosted American Idol in 2008, and many professional sports viewing parties for years. The roof system, produced by Structurflex, is made of an Ethylene TetraFluoro Ethylene (ETFE) single-skin membrane. Construction of the roof began on August 17, 2007.

The ground floor of the Kansas City Live! block focuses on bars and restaurants, including McFadden's Sports Saloon, Flying Saucer, Cleaver & Cork, KC Hooley House, Johnny's Tavern, Pizza Bar, and County Road Ice House, which is a locally owned partnership between Back Napkin and Joes BBQ. The second floor of Kansas City Live! houses the night clubs and entertainment concepts, including Mosaic Ultra Lounge, Angels Rock Bar, Howl at the Moon, PBR Big Sky, Shark Bar, and No Other Pub, which is a partnership between Cordish and local MLS soccer team Sporting Kansas City.

== Residential ==
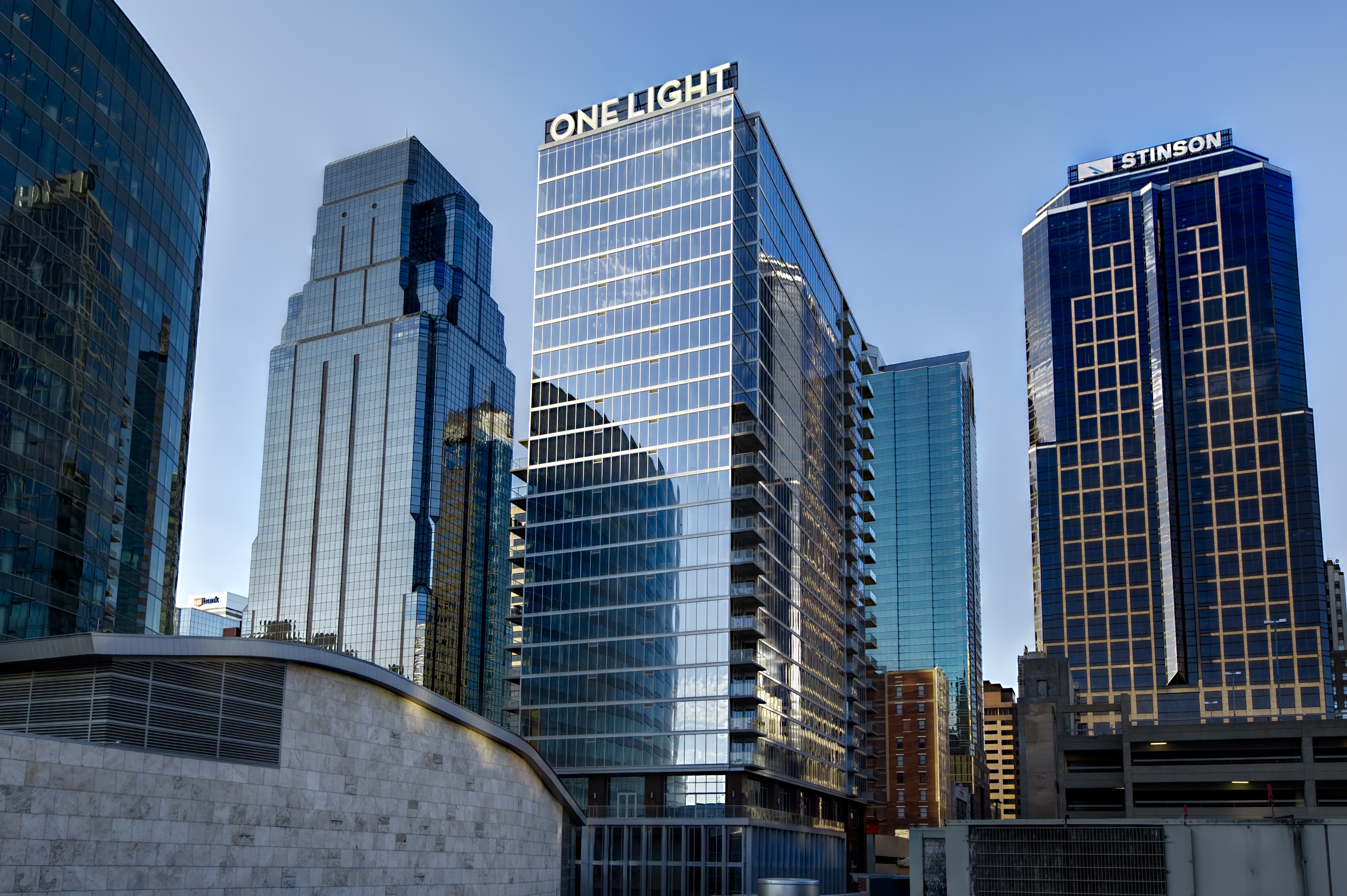
One Light Luxury Apartments

Within the Power & Light District, Cordish plans to build four high-end residential towers. On April 22, 2014, Cordish broke ground on the first apartment tower called One Light Luxury Apartments. One Light opened 80% leased on December 8, 2015. The tower is 25 stories tall and connected to the nearby Cosentino's Grocery store and OneLife Fitness gym. Two Light Luxury Apartments opened on May 4, 2018. The 24-story luxury apartment building features 296 units, each with floor-to-ceiling windows. Two Light also includes a 438-space garage, 3,100 square feet (290 m^{2}) of boutique retail space, and 15,000 square feet (1,400 m^{2}) of coworking office space, Spark KC. Three Light's 301 foot tower was completed in September 2023 with 25 stories and 288 units.

== Festival license ==
In 2005, the Cordish Company successfully lobbied the Missouri General Assembly for a new law pertaining to any "entertainment district" in Downtown Kansas City to allow patrons to remove any alcoholic beverage from any establishment in the District and carry it openly throughout the portions of the District not open to vehicular traffic, if the beverage is in a plastic cup marked with the logo of the establishment at which it was purchased. This is one of only a few places in the United States with such an open container allowance.

== See also ==
- Kansas City Convention Center
