= Frank Howe =

Frank Howe may refer to:

- Frank E. Howe (1870–1956), Vermont newspaperman and politician
- Frank M. Howe (1849–1909), architect in Kansas City, Missouri and Boston, Massachusetts
