= Adams Academy =

Historic building in Quincy, Massachusetts, US

- U.S. National Register of Historic Places
- U.S. National Historic Landmark
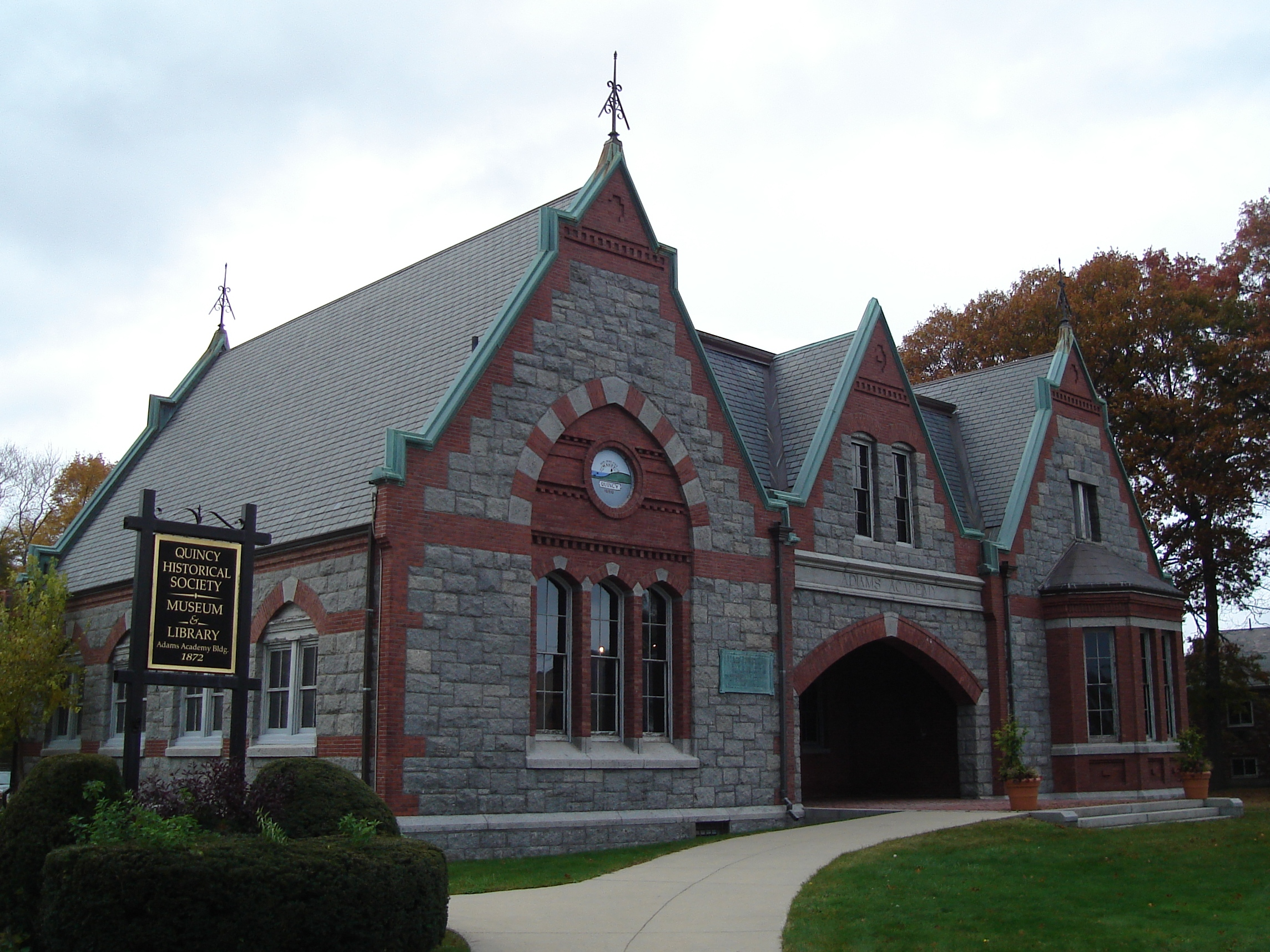
- Front of the Academy building

- Location within Massachusetts Location within the United States
- Location: 8 Adams Street, Quincy, Massachusetts
- Coordinates: 42°15′13.27″N 71°0′22.97″W
- Built: 1869
- Architect: Ware & Van Brunt
- Architectural style: Late Gothic Revival
- NRHP reference No.: 74000379

Significant dates
- Added to NRHP: September 6, 1974
- Designated NHL: April 19, 1994

The Adams Academy was a school for boys in Quincy, Massachusetts founded by President John Adams, who outlined his wishes for a school to be built on the site of John Hancock's birthplace in an 1822 deed of trust. Opened in 1872, the Academy operated as a college preparatory school for just over three decades, ultimately closing in 1908. Today, the property is still owned by Adams's original trust, the Adams Temple and School Fund, and its landmark Ware and Van Brunt building has been leased to the Quincy Historical Society for several decades.

== Origins ==
President John Adams (1735-1826) was a native of the northern precinct of Braintree, Massachusetts, which later became the town of Quincy, Massachusetts. In 1822, Adams executed several deeds of trust to convey a portion of his estate assets to a trust, the Adams Temple and School Fund, with the Town of Quincy named as its fiduciary trustee.

The fund was established to ensure the realization of several specific charitable intentions recorded by Adams, who instructed the trustee to engage in income-generating activity through trust-permitted uses of the fund's real property asset portfolio, comprising approximately 160 acres (0.65 km^{2}) across multiple parcels in Quincy, and to "invest and re-invest" this income in "some solid public fund, either of the Commonwealth, or of the United States" to maximize the monetary value of the fund.

When a sufficient amount of financial capital was accumulated, Adams' instructions called firstly for the construction and furnishing of a congregational church, and secondly, for the founding of a Latin and Greek academy for boys and the construction of a suitable schoolhouse. Adams advised that both structures be built from local Quincy granite sourced from his quarry lands.

A parcel consisting of 8 acres (0.032 km^{2}) in Quincy Center was chosen for the schoolhouse, with Adams's request that the structure be erected specifically upon the "ancient cellar" of a former house built and inhabited by John Hancock Sr. and his family — the birthplace of Hancock's son, founding father and Governor of Massachusetts John Hancock — and later occupied by several eras of influential Quincy figures and families personally revered by Adams, including Adams's childhood pastor Rev. Lemuel Bryant and members of the Quincy political family, including Colonel Josiah Quincy I and his son, revolutionary patriot and lawyer Josiah Quincy II.

Adams's wish was for the church to be constructed first; the First Parish Church was completed in 1828, just two years after Adams's death. The school came significantly later — approximately fifty years after the founding of the Adams Fund, its board of supervisors hired the architects William Robert Ware and Henry Van Brunt to design the schoolhouse. Architectural plans were approved in 1869, and the firm of Messrs. Clement and Creasy was contracted for the school's construction. The Adams Academy building was finished in 1871 at a cost of $29,000.

== History of the academy ==
The Adams Academy opened its doors in 1872, and remained in operation until 1908. Its peak enrollment was 140 students during the 1876–77 school year.

The Academy was modeled after its athletic rivals, Phillips Academy and Phillips Exeter Academy. Per Adams's wishes, the school curriculum strongly emphasized the study of the classics. Students were given an education that aimed to prepare them for matriculation at Harvard College. By the early twentieth century, however, enrollment was in decline, and the Adams Academy closed in 1908.

== Later uses of the building ==
After the Academy closed, the Adams Temple and School Fund sought other uses for the building that were in keeping with John Adams's original bequest. For many years, it was used by a variety of civic organizations, including the Boy Scouts, American Legion, and the Red Cross.

In 1972, the building was leased to the Quincy Historical Society, which is now its tenant. The Society uses the building as a museum and library.

== Adams Academy today ==
The building was listed on the National Register of Historic Places in 1974, and designated a National Historic Landmark in 1994. It is located at 8 Adams Street.

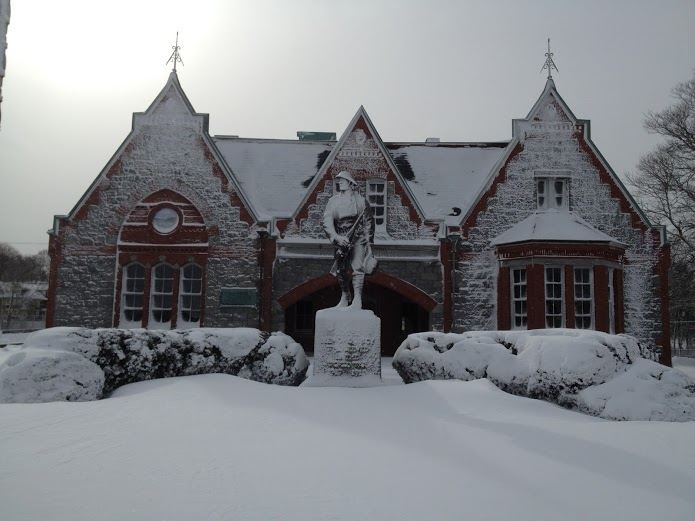
Adams Academy during Blizzard Nemo in 2013

== See also ==
- List of National Historic Landmarks in Massachusetts
- National Register of Historic Places listings in Quincy, Massachusetts

== Gallery ==
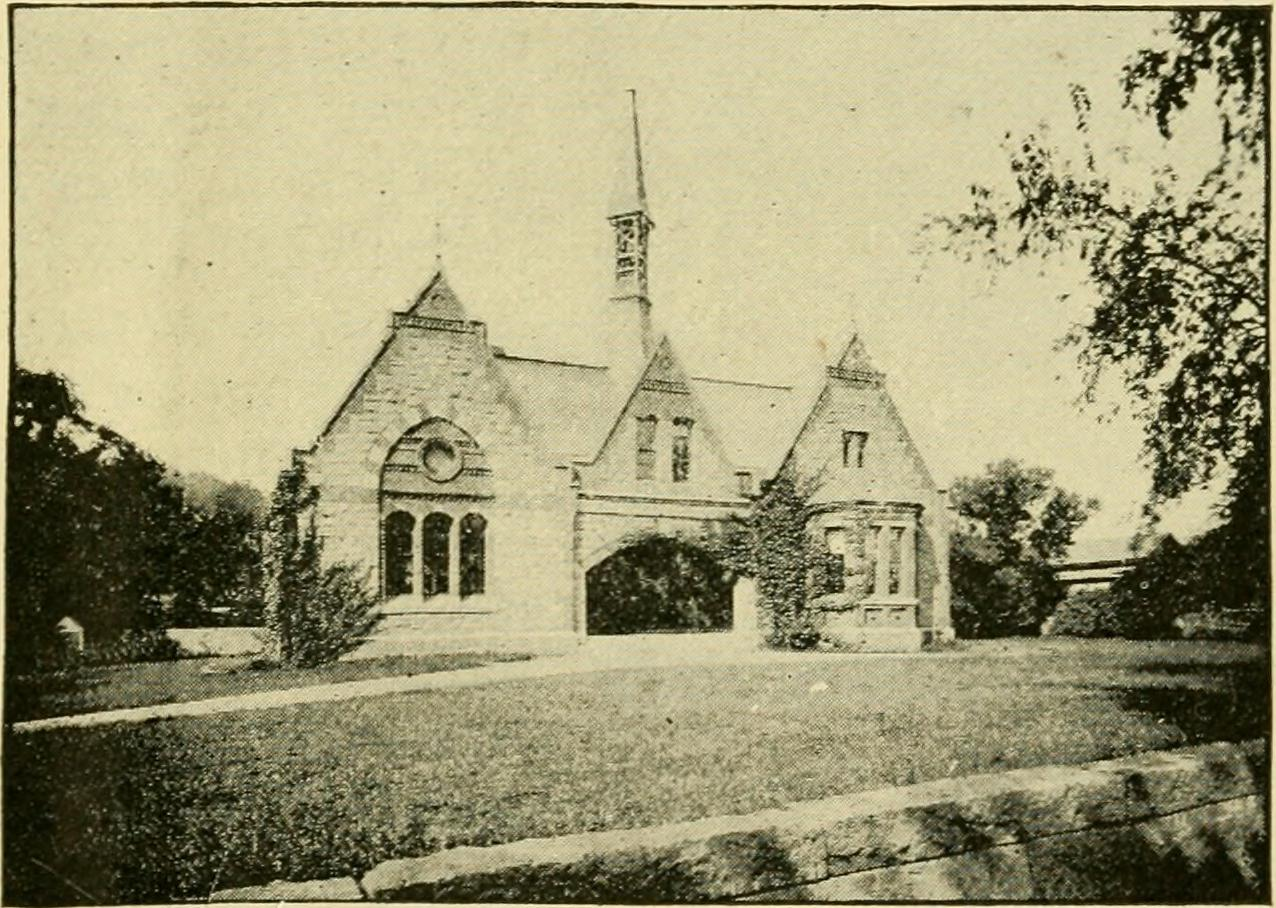
Adams Academy in 1904

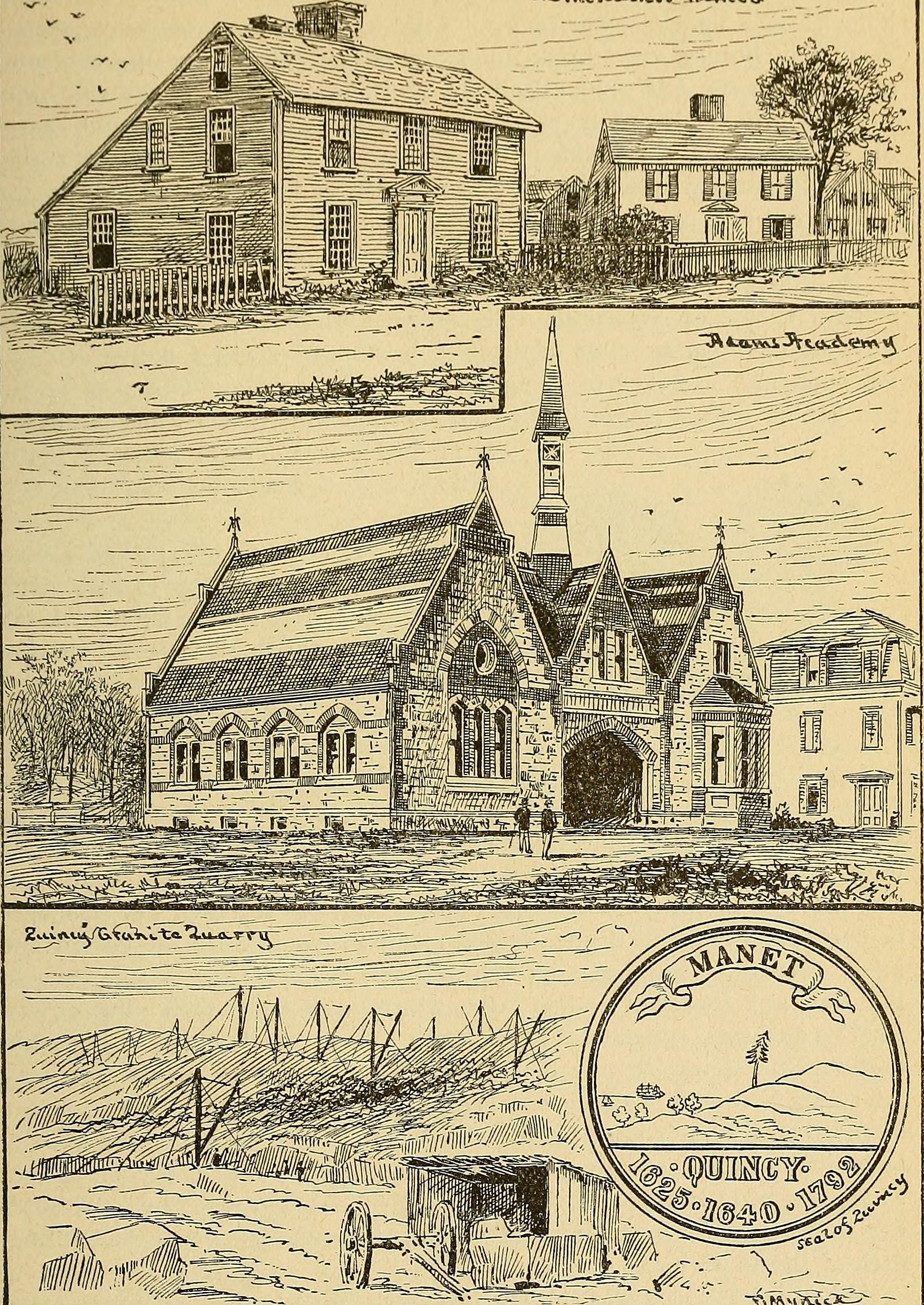
Adams Academy in the center
