= Quincy Historical Society =

- Seal of the Quincy Historical Society

- Location in Massachusetts
- Established: 1893
- Location: 8 Adams Street, Quincy, Massachusetts
- Coordinates: 42.253871°N 71.005899°W
- Type: Heritage centre
- Public transit access: Quincy Center MBTA station
- Website: www.quincyhistory.org

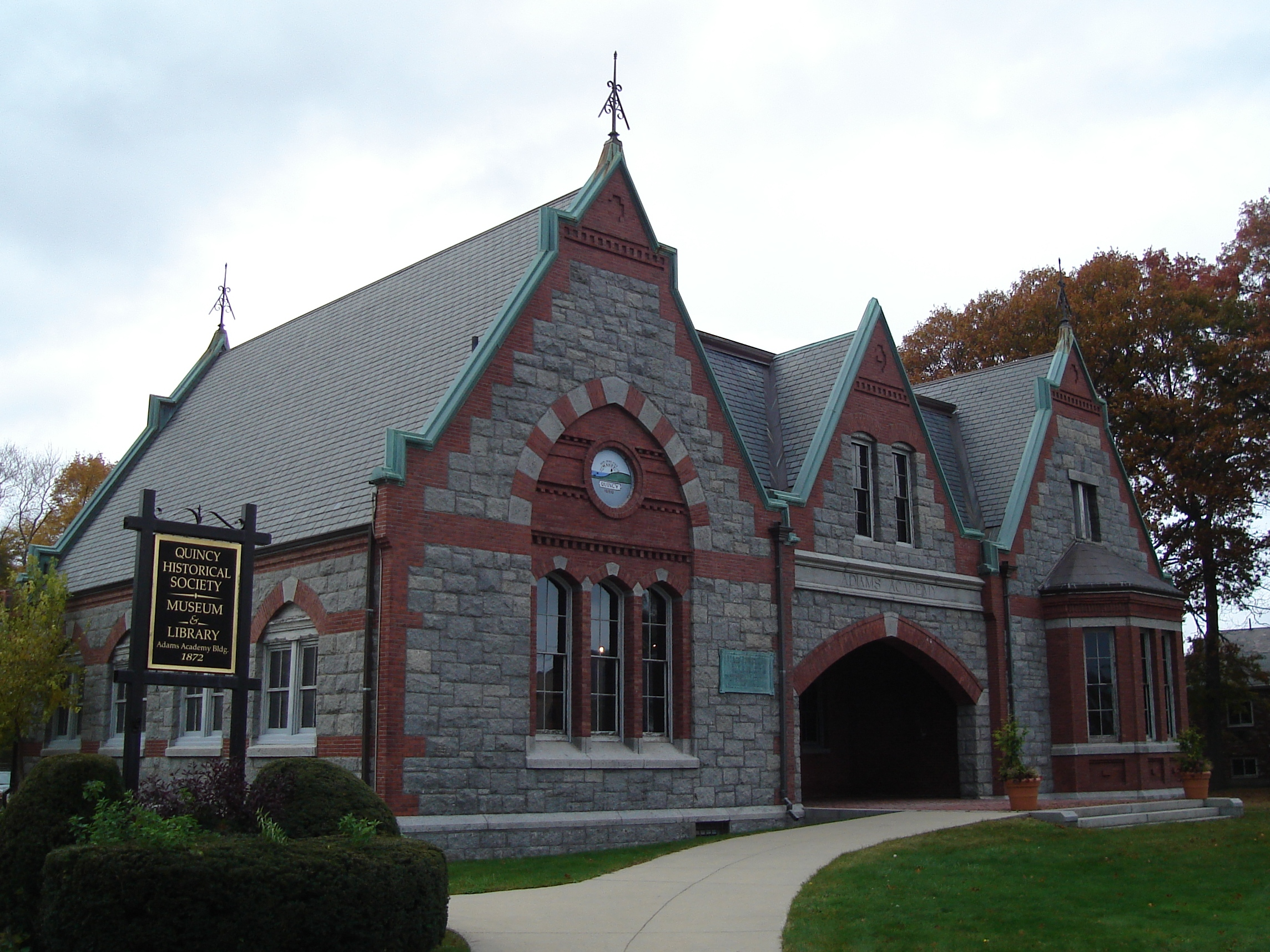
The Adams Academy Building, home of the Society.

The Quincy Historical Society (QHS) is located at 8 Adams Street in Quincy, Norfolk County, Massachusetts, United States. It was founded in 1893 by Charles Francis Adams, Jr. Dr. Edward Fitzgerald is the executive director.

The society occupies the former Adams Academy building. The building was designed by Henry Van Brunt and William Robert Ware, the latter of whom was the architect of the Episcopal Divinity School in Cambridge, Massachusetts, built in 1869, has been listed on the National Register of Historic Places since 1974, and was designated a National Historic Landmark in 1994.

The Society's Quincy History Museum features exhibits about the community's social and cultural history, including Native Americans, the Colonial era, President John Adams and his family, area shipbuilders and granite workers, and local entrepreneurs and businesses, such as Howard Johnson.

The Quincy History Museum & shop are open Mon-Fri 9-4 year-round, Saturdays 12–3 April 14 through November 10. The library is open Monday through Friday, 9-12 and by appointment, year-round. It is closed on holidays.

== See also ==
- List of historical societies in Massachusetts
