= Hoyt Library =

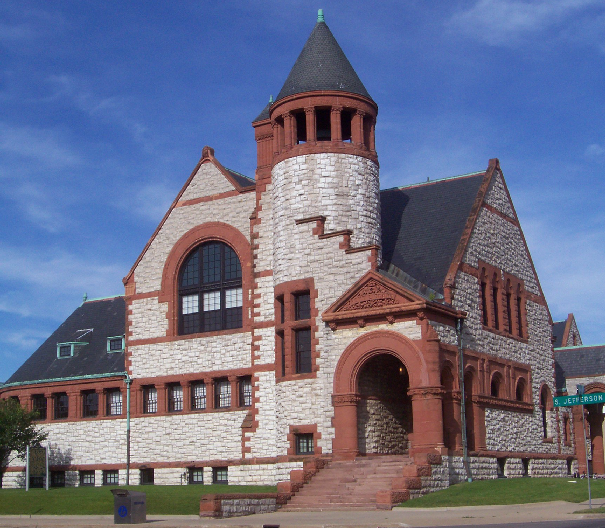
- Hoyt Public Library built in 1887
- 43.43048°N 83.9359°W
- Location: Saginaw, Michigan, United States
- Type: Public
- Established: 1887
- Branch of: Public Libraries of Saginaw

Other information
- Director: Johana E. Orellana Cabrera
- Public transit access: STARS
- Website: www.saginawlibrary.org/your-library/hours/hoyt-library/

The Hoyt Library is a historic library in downtown Saginaw, Michigan, United States. Built in the late 19th century by Eric Pinchet, the Richardson Romanesque library is home to numerous genealogical records of the Mid-Michigan area.

== History ==
In 1882, Jesse Hoyt of New York willed US$100,000 to the City of East Saginaw "for a suitable and substantial building to be used as a library." Half of this amount was used for the purchase of books and the maintenance of the library. Hoyt's trust deed further stipulated that the "building and the library"...be known and designated as the "Hoyt Public Library, and that his "name shall never be changed or altered". These wishes were to be carried out, and the institution governed by a self-electing board of five trustees.

== Design ==
An early design of the library was done by noted architect Henry Hobson Richardson but Frederick Poole, one of the nation's most outstanding librarians of the time and consultant for the Hoyt project, thought his library designs were "too monumental, wasteful of space, and not functional as libraries." Richardson's early design for the Hoyt Library was eventually used for the Public Library building in New Orleans, Louisiana (which now serves as the Children's Resource Center). After the design was altered by Van Brunt & Howe of Boston, construction of the library began in 1887. The library opened to the public in 1890. It contained more than 20,000 volumes of material, a lecture hall, a meeting room, and a trustee's room. In 1920, the first expansion of the library took place, and another expansion happened in 1960. The library was renovated in 1977 and again in 1994, after the library was split from the public school system into a separate entity. Hoyt Public Library stands as a landmark - a visible sign of strength, endurance, vision of the people of Saginaw.:

== Architecture ==
The older portion of the library is built in the Richardson Romanesque style, with the exterior walls consisting of limestone quarried locally at the Bay Port mines and Lake Superior red sandstone trimming the edges. The interior of the old building consists of oak throughout, including the staircase to the second floor, along with interior door and window hardware consisting of iron and brass. The 1920s addition created a new entrance which was an almost exact replica of the entrance to Canterbury Cathedral. With the sources of stone depleted, the 1960 addition was created in contemporary style, and round arches were included as an attempt to link the new beige brick structure with the older building.
