= Soldiers' and Sailors' Monument (Arlington, Massachusetts) =

Monument in Arlington, Massachusetts

Soldiers' and Sailors' Monument - Arlington MA
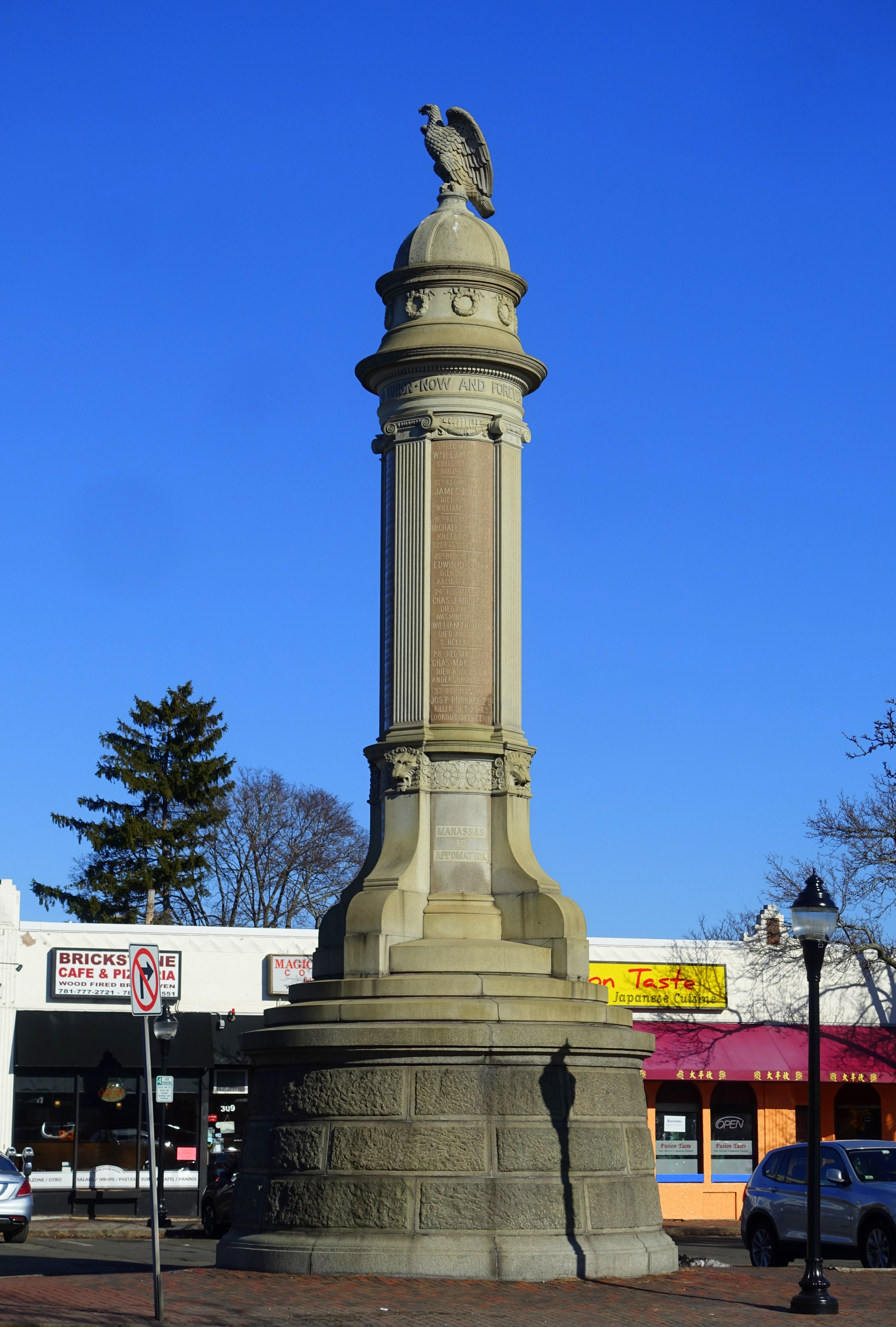
- Artist: Van Brunt and Howe (architects)
- Year: 1887
- Medium: Granite
- Subject: Pillar with veterans names, inscription and Eagle Finial
- Dimensions: (42 ft in)
- Location: Arlington, Massachusetts, U.S.

Soldiers’ and Sailors’ Monument (1887) is a monument in Arlington, MA, dedicated to the men of who served in the Civil War. The victory column in Arlington is located at the junction of Massachusetts Avenue and Broadway. 42 feet tall, it is made from three different types of granite from Barre, Vermont; Quincy, Massachusetts; and Westerly, Rhode Island. It was constructed by the Mitchell Granite Company of Quincy (which built many a stone Civil War memorial in Massachusetts) and dedicated on June 17, 1887.

The primary inscription reads, “In grateful remembrance of the Soldiers of Arlington who gave their lives to their country in the war for the defense of the Union 1861-1865.” Thirty three people are listed along with their place of death.

Another panel inscription quotes Abraham Lincoln, "THAT THE GOVERNMENT OF THE PEOPLE BY THE PEOPLE AND FOR THE PEOPLE SHALL NOT PERISH FROM THE EARTH"

A third panel reads Manassas to Appomattox.

The memorial by architects Van Brunt and Howe contains elements of Beaux Artes and Richardson Romanesque styles. The eagle finial rests astride a dome decorated with wreaths. An inscription reading " LIBERTY AND UNION- ONE AND INSEPARABLE- NOW AND FOREVER" circumscribes the marble frieze below the dome. Four low relief columns decorate the supporting pillar with names of war dead decorating intervening pink granite panels. Four lion faces are beneath the pillars with the entire mass resting on a circular base of granite blocks.

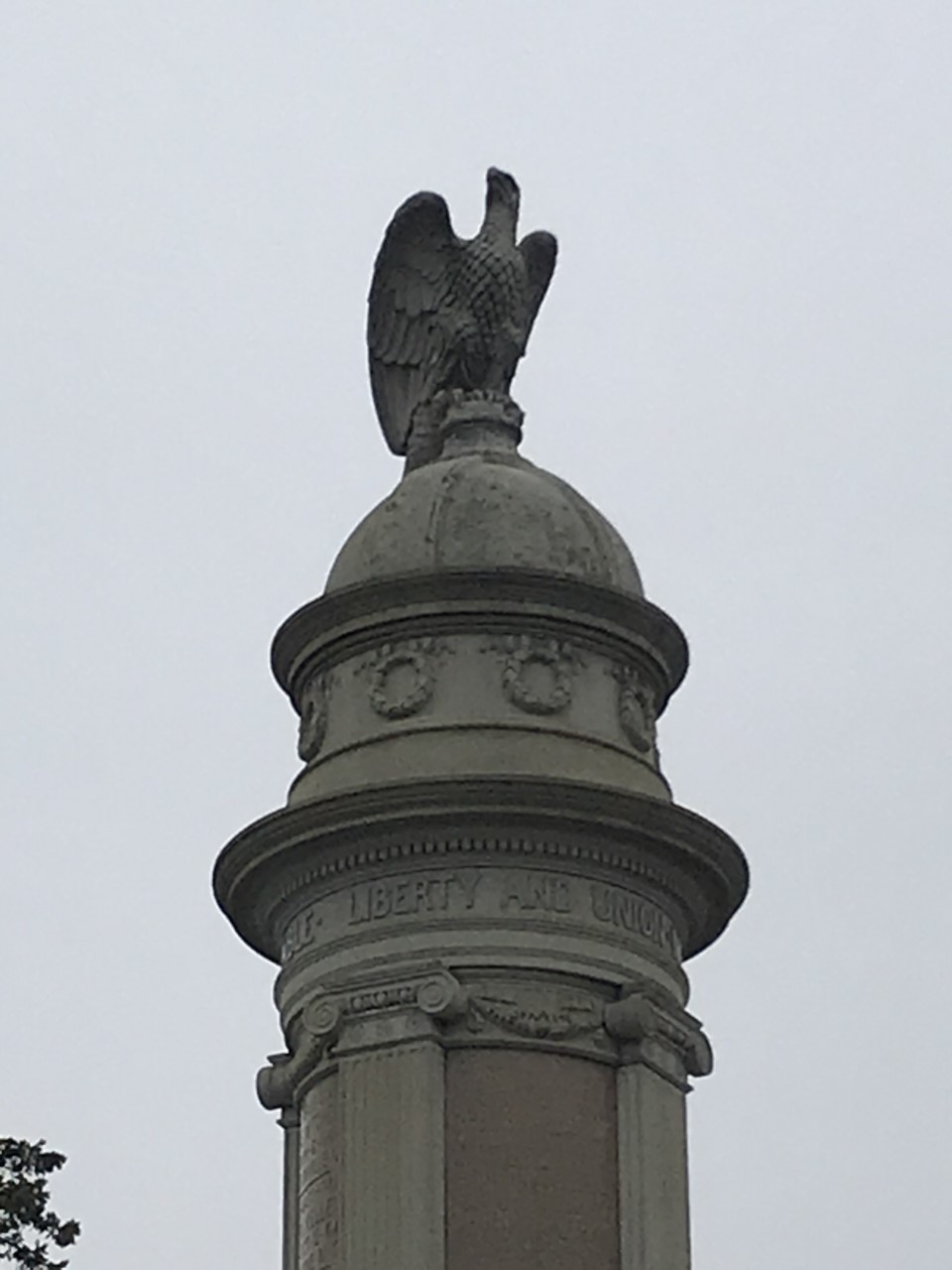
The Soldiers and Sailors Memorial can be found at 433 Massachusetts Avenue at the intersection with Broadway in Arlington, Massachusetts.

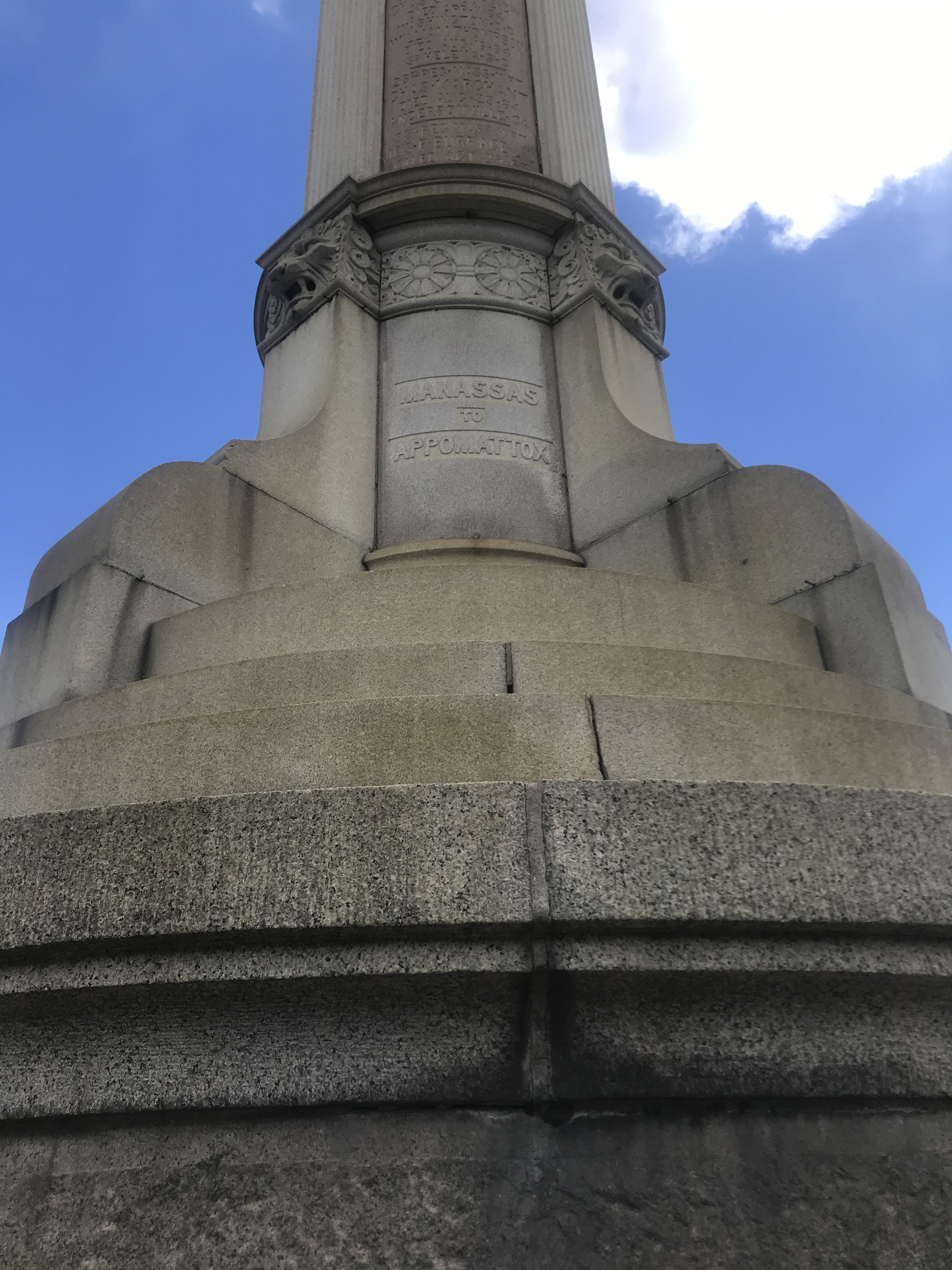
