= Gershom Jacques Van Brunt =

American naval officer (1798–1863)

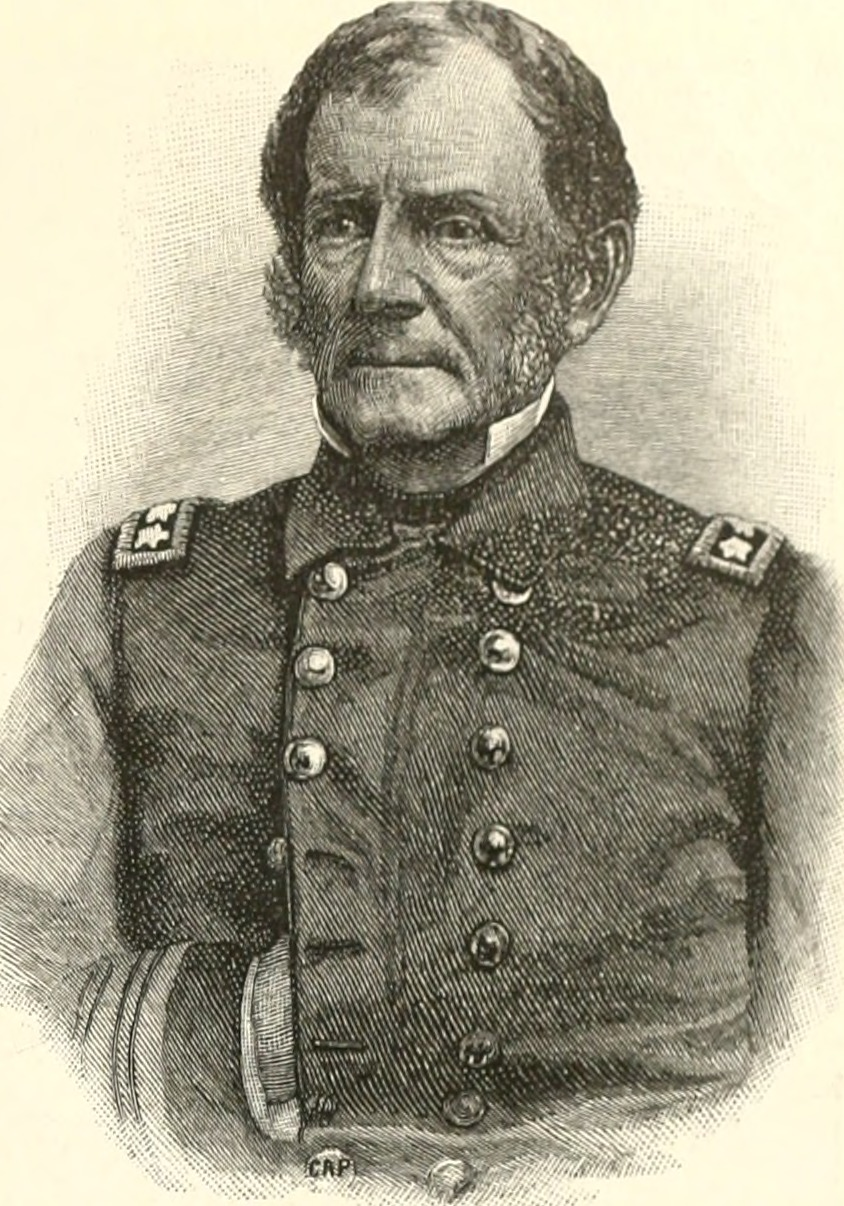
Sketch of Van Brunt

Gershom Jacques Van Brunt (August 28, 1798 – December 17, 1863) was an American naval officer during the Civil War (1861-1865). He held the rank of commodore in the U.S. Navy.

== Biography ==
=== Early life ===
Van Brunt was born in New Jersey in 1798, and entered the Navy from that state in 1818. With his wife, Elizabeth Price Bradlee, (Note: Elizabeth was the daughter of David W. Bradlee.) he was the father of architect Henry Van Brunt.

=== Career ===
In the spring of 1861, he was assigned to the command of the steam frigate Minnesota. There he was employed in the severe and trying blockade service at Hampton Roads and also took an important part in the reduction of the Hatteras Forts. He was subsequently entrusted with the supervision and equipment of the expedition to New Orleans under General Banks. At the time of his death he was acting under the orders of the War Department as Inspector of Transports for the New England District. He received his commission as Commodore in July 1862.

When the USS Minnesota was recommissioned on 2 May 1861 with Van Brunt in command, it became flagship of the Atlantic Blockading Squadron, commanded by Flag Officer Silas Stringham. She arrived at Hampton Roads, Virginia, on 13 May and the next day captured the schooners Mary Willis, Delaware Farmer, and Emily Ann. Minnesota took the bark Winfred on the 25th and the bark Sally McGee on 26 June. Schooner Sally Mears became her prize 1 July and bark Mary Warick struck her colors to the steam frigate on the 10th.

After a battle with the CSS Virginia, the Minnesota was forced up onto mud bank. All night tugs worked to haul her off, but to no avail. However, during the night USS Monitor arrived. "All on board felt we had a friend that would stand by us in our hour of trial," Van Brunt wrote in his official report the day after the engagement.

=== Death ===
He died at his residence in Dedham, Massachusetts, on December 17, 1863. He was remembered for his fervent patriotism.

== Works cited ==
- Worthington, Erastus (1869). Dedication of the Memorial Hall, in Dedham, September 29, 1868: With an Appendix. John Cox, Jr.
