= Henry Van Brunt =

American architect (1832–1904)

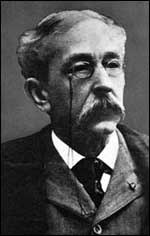
- Born: September 5, 1832; Boston, Massachusetts
- Died: April 8, 1903 (aged 70); Milton, Massachusetts
- Occupation: Architect
- Buildings: Memorial Hall (Harvard University); Electricity Building, World's Columbian Exposition

Henry Van Brunt FAIA (September 5, 1832 – April 8, 1903) was an American architect and architectural writer.

== Life and work ==
Van Brunt was born in Boston in 1832 to Gershom Jacques Van Brunt and Elizabeth Price Bradlee. Van Brunt attended Boston Latin School, and graduated from Harvard College in 1854.

From 1854 to 1857, he apprenticed with architect George Snell, then worked with Richard Morris Hunt, in New York City.

During the Civil War, Van Brunt served as Secretary to the Admiral of the North Atlantic Squadron, United States Navy. He resigned on February 15, 1864.

In the 1860s, Van Brunt and fellow Harvard graduate William Robert Ware established the architectural firm of Ware & Van Brunt. The firm produced designs for many buildings in the Boston area, including Harvard University's Memorial Hall, "said to be one of the greatest examples of Ruskinian Gothic architecture outside of England".

In 1869, he married Alice S. Osborn; together they had 6 children. In 1874 Van Brunt published a translation of Eugène Viollet-le-Duc's Discourses on architecture, and he remained a prolific writer through his career.

His partnership with Ware dissolved in 1881. The same year, Van Brunt and former employee Frank M. Howe established the firm of Van Brunt & Howe, and about six years after took the dramatic step of moving his office from Boston to Kansas City, partly for multiple commissions for the Union Pacific Railroad for grand stations in western cities like Ogden, Utah (1889; burned down 1923), Denver, Colorado (1895; rebuilt 1912), Cheyenne, Wyoming and Omaha, Nebraska (1899; replaced 1931). Many Kansas City civic landmarks of the time were Van Brunt's designs. Stylistically, most of his later work is comfortably consistent with Richardsonian Romanesque; in at least one case, the Hoyt Library, he adapted and finished a rejected Richardson design.

In 1884 he was elected an officer of the American Institute of Architects. In 1899 he became president of the AIA for a one-year term.

Van Brunt returned to Massachusetts around 1902, and died in Milton, Massachusetts, in 1903. His headstone in Cambridge Cemetery, Cambridge, Massachusetts, gives his date of death as April 7, 1903.

== Ware & Van Brunt ==
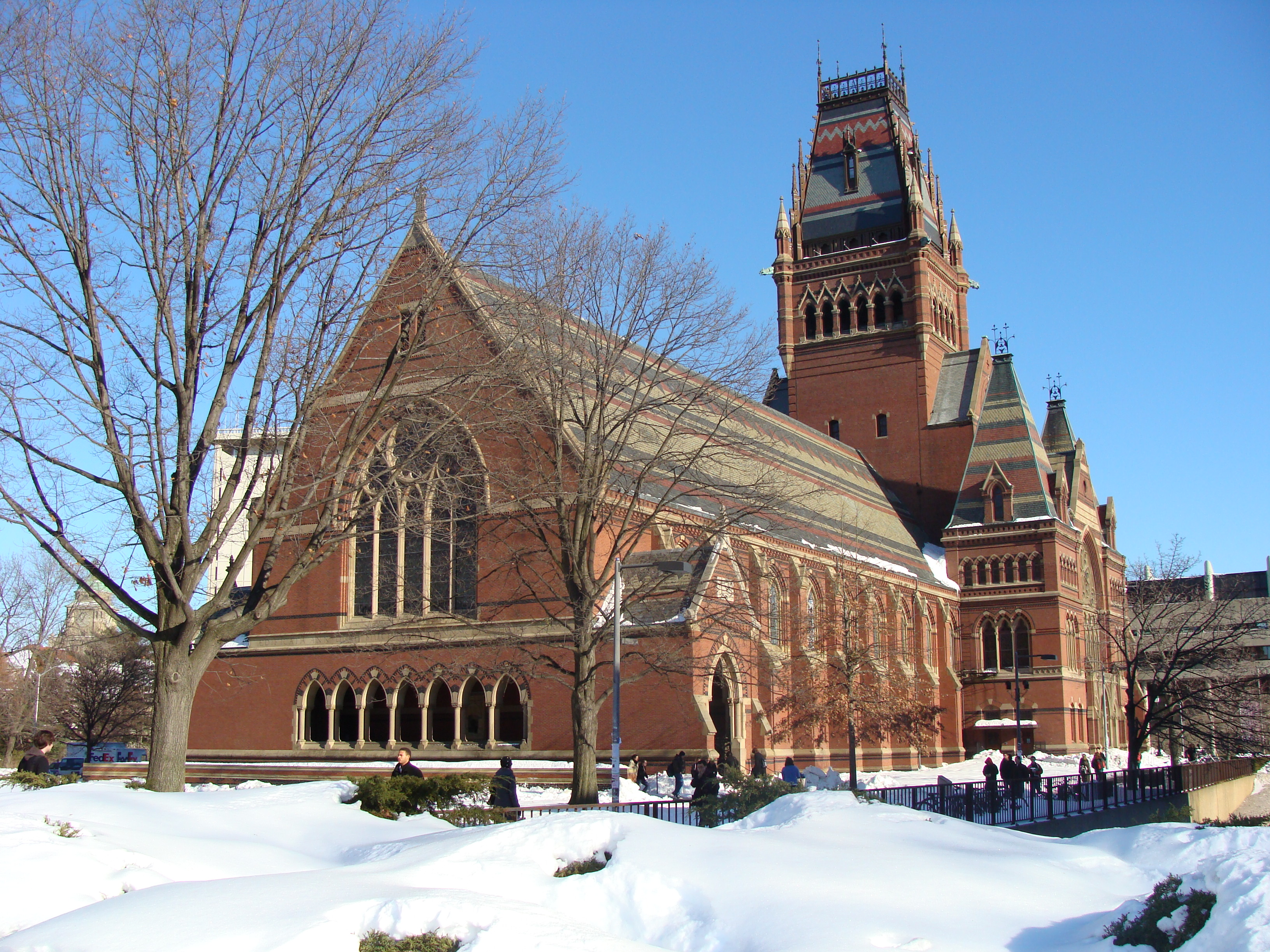
Memorial Hall (1870), Harvard University

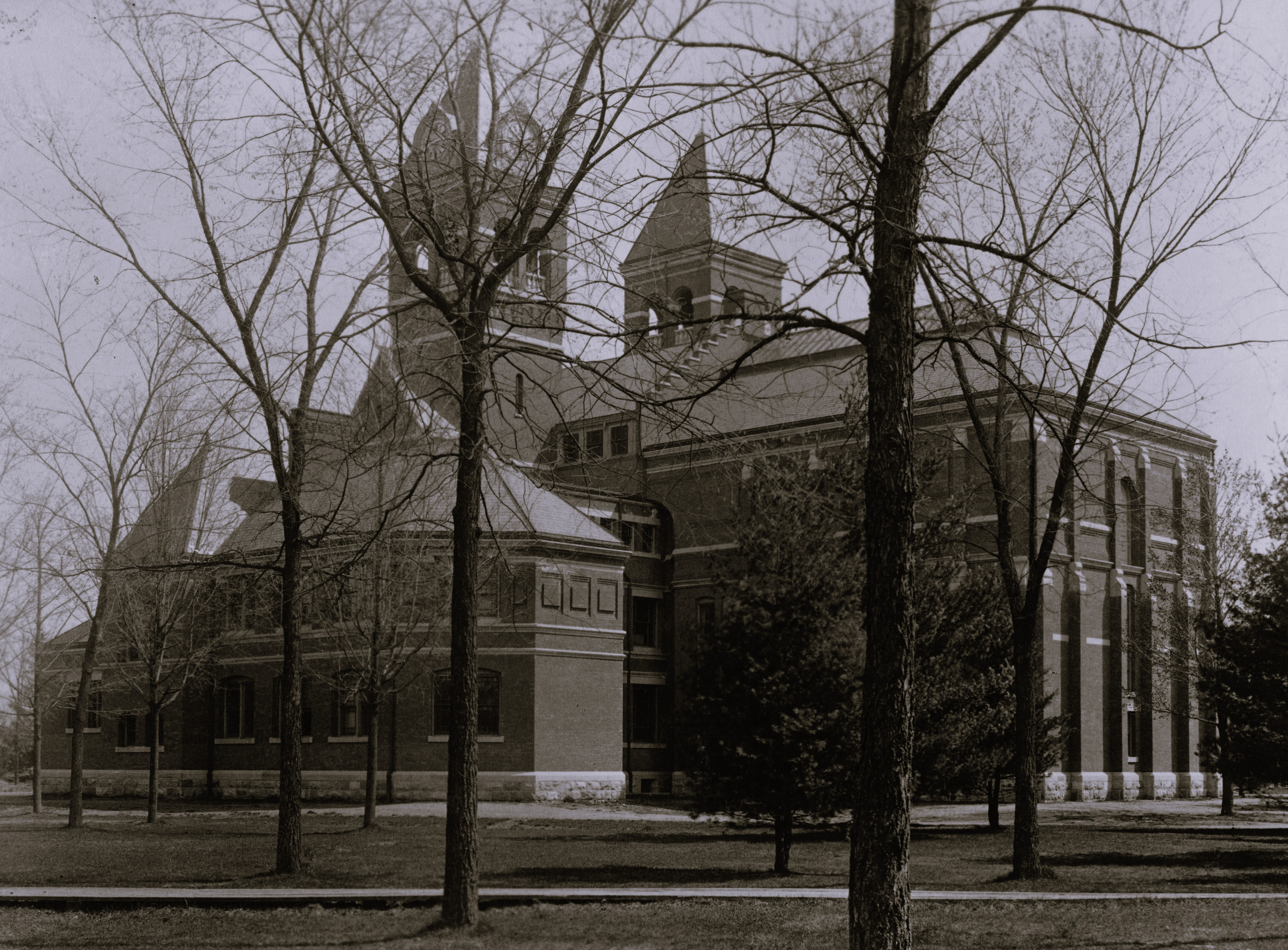
Old Library (1881-1883), University of Michigan

- 1867 - Ether Monument, in the Boston Public Garden, with sculptor J.Q.A. Ward
- 1867 - First Church, Boston, Massachusetts
- 1868 - St. John's Memorial Chapel at the Episcopal Divinity School, Cambridge, Massachusetts
- 1869 - Adams Academy, now the Quincy Historical Society, Quincy, Massachusetts
- 1870 - Memorial Hall (Harvard University), Cambridge, Massachusetts, continuously redesigned through 1897
- 1870 - Addition to Harvard Hall, Harvard University, Cambridge, Massachusetts
- 1870 - Weld Hall, Harvard University
- 1872 - Charles Freeland tomb, Mount Auburn Cemetery, Cambridge
- 1873 - Lawrence Hall, Episcopal Divinity School, Cambridge, expanded 1880
- 1875 - Addition to Gore Hall, Harvard University, Cambridge, Massachusetts (demolished)
- 1875 - Walter Hunnewell house, Hunnewell estate, Wellesley, Massachusetts (then West Needham)
- 1881 - Yorktown Memorial, Yorktown, Virginia, with sculptor J.Q.A. Ward
- 1881 - Music Hall, Wellesley College, Massachusetts
- 1881-1883 - Old Library, University of Michigan (demolished)

== Van Brunt & Howe ==
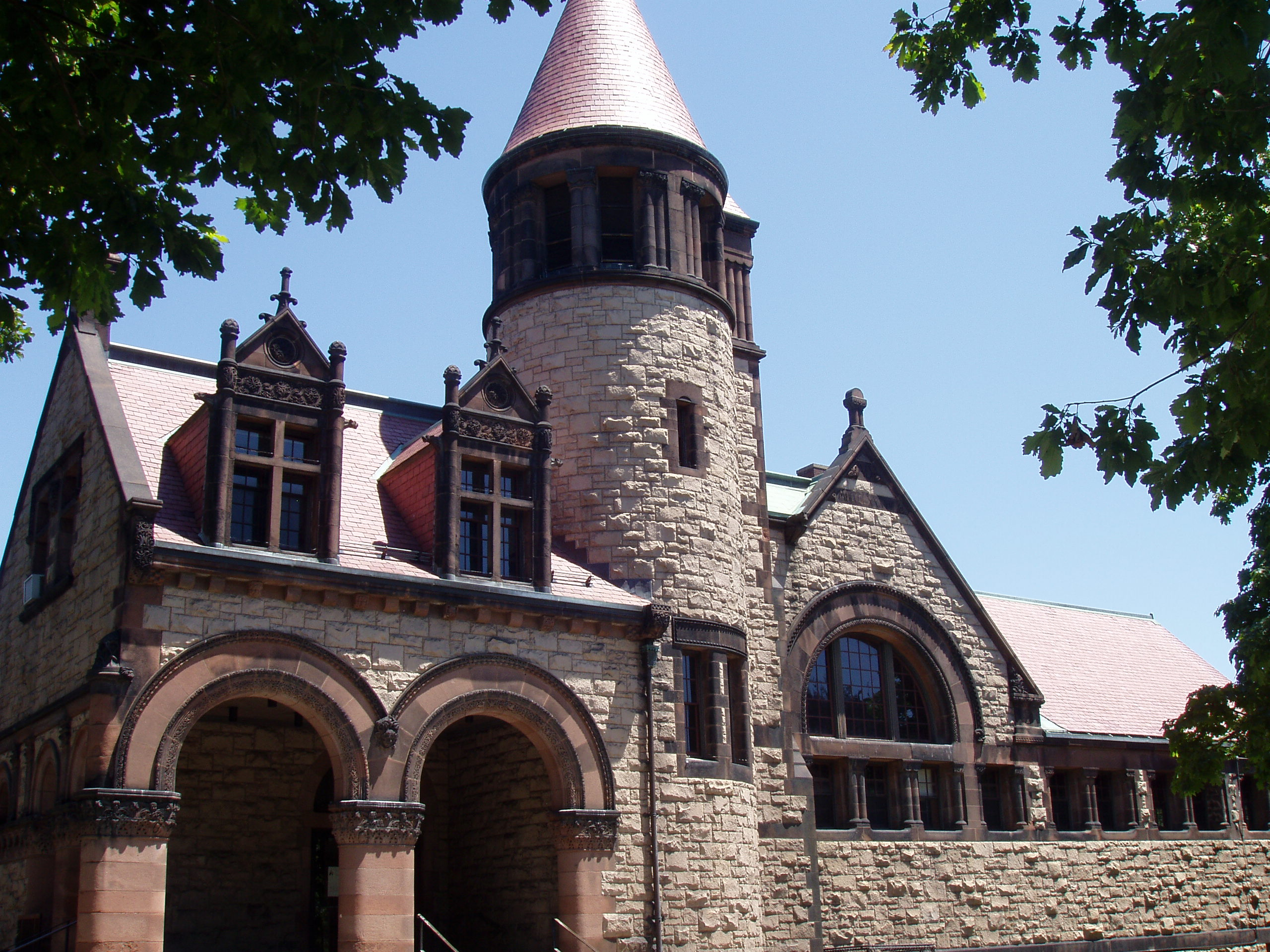
Cambridge Public Library (1888), Cambridge, Massachusetts

- 1883 - 167 Brattle Street (his residence), Cambridge, Massachusetts
- 1883 - Harvard Medical School, Boston, Massachusetts (demolished)
- 1883 - William Washington Gordon Monument, Savannah, Georgia
- 1884 - First National Bank, Portland, Maine
- 1885 - Cheyenne Union Depot, now the Wyoming Transportation Museum, 15th Street and Capitol Avenue, Cheyenne, Wyoming
- 1887 - Soldiers' and Sailors' Monument, Arlington, Massachusetts
- 1887 - Hoyt Library, Saginaw, Michigan
- 1888 - Cambridge Public Library, Cambridge, Massachusetts
- 1888 - Gibraltar Building, Kansas City, Missouri (razed)
- 1889 - Union Pacific Railroad Depot, North 2nd Street, Lawrence, Kansas
- 1889-1890 - Emery, Bird, Thayer Dry Goods Company, Kansas City (razed in 1973)
- 1890-1896 - Union Station, foot of Northwest 6th Avenue, Portland, Oregon
- 1893 - Electricity Building and the Wyoming Building, World's Columbian Exposition, Chicago (demolished)
- 1894 - Spooner Hall, University of Kansas, Lawrence, Kansas
- 1895 - Union Station, Denver, Colorado (largely razed in 1912)
- 1896-1898 - Hurst Hall, the first structure at the American University, Washington, DC
- 1904 - Palace of Varied Industries, Louisiana Purchase Exposition, St. Louis, Missouri (razed)
- 1904 - Pipe Organ Case of the 10,000 pipe instrument exhibited by the Los Angeles Art Organ Co., Festival Hall, Louisiana Purchase Exposition, St. Louis, Missouri (a temporary construction)

== Writing ==
- Translator of: Eugène Viollet-le-Duc. Discourses on architecture. Boston : J.R. Osgood, 1875.
- On the Present Condition and Prospects of Architecture. Atlantic Monthly 57, no. 341 (March 1886).
- Henry Hobson Richardson, Architect. Atlantic Monthly 58:349 (November 1886).
- Architecture in the West, Atlantic Monthly 64:386 (December 1889).
- Greek Lines and Other Architectural Essays. Houghton, Mifflin. 1893

== Gallery ==
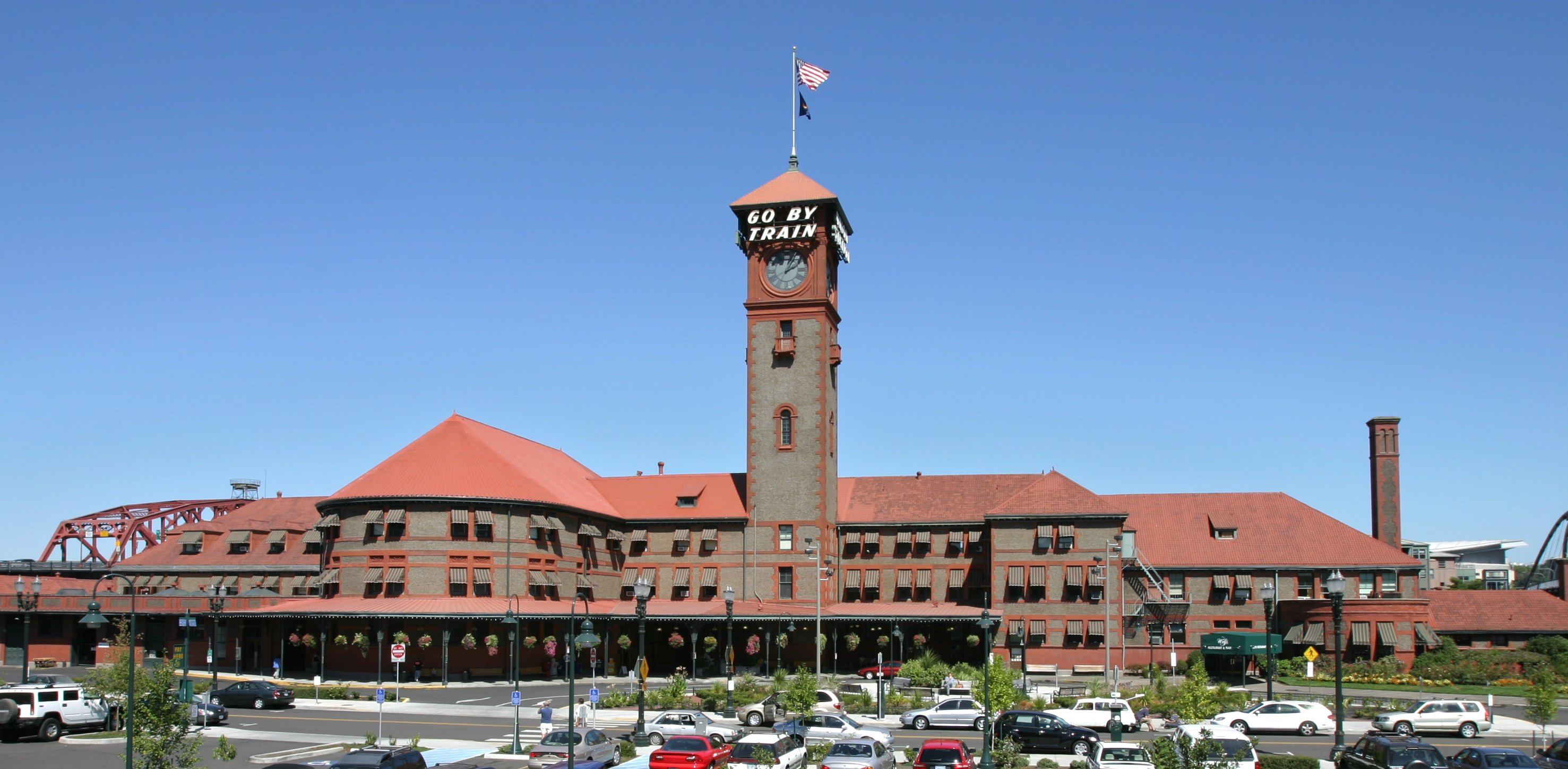
Union Station (1896), Portland, Oregon

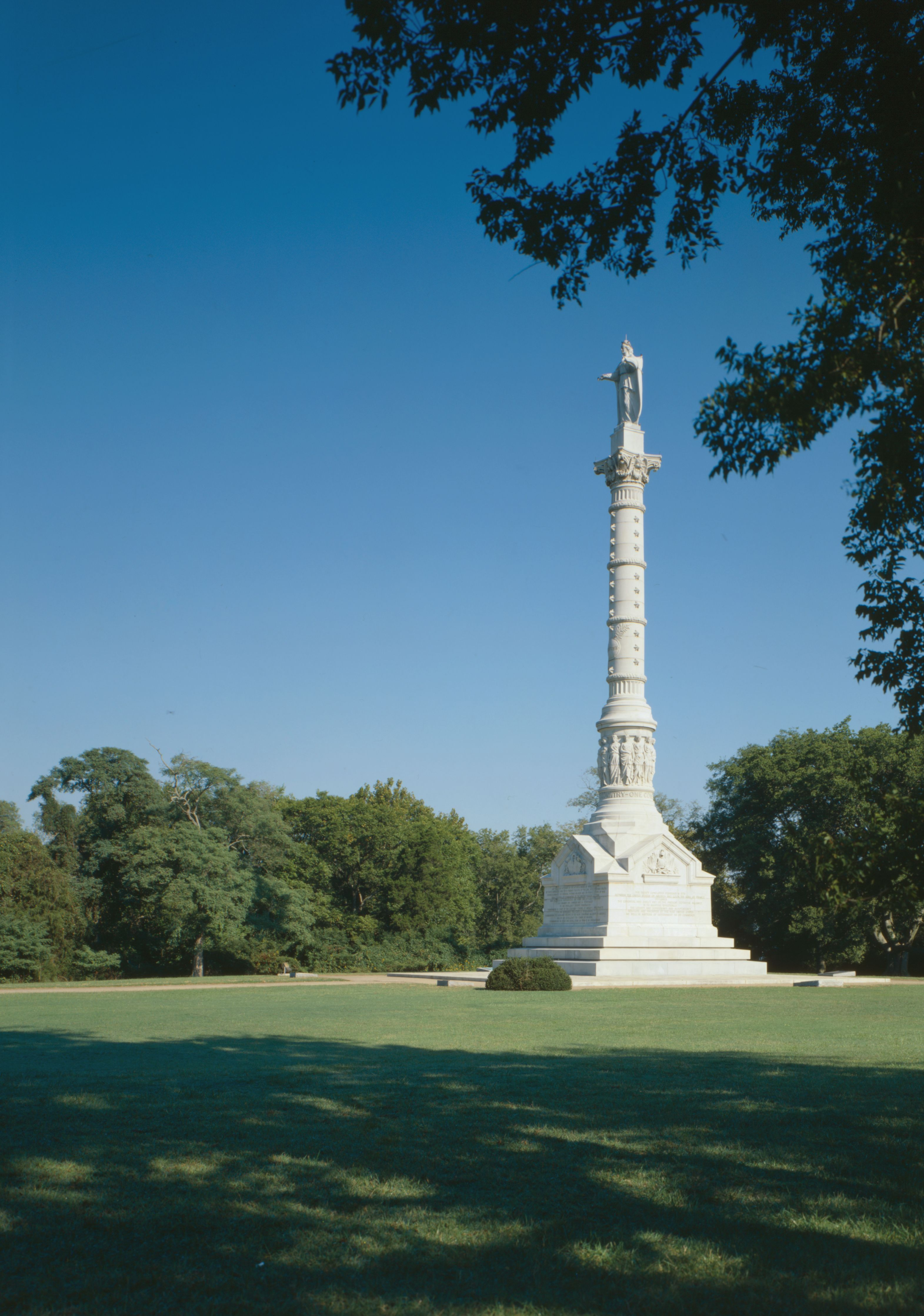
Yorktown Memorial, 1881, Yorktown, Virginia

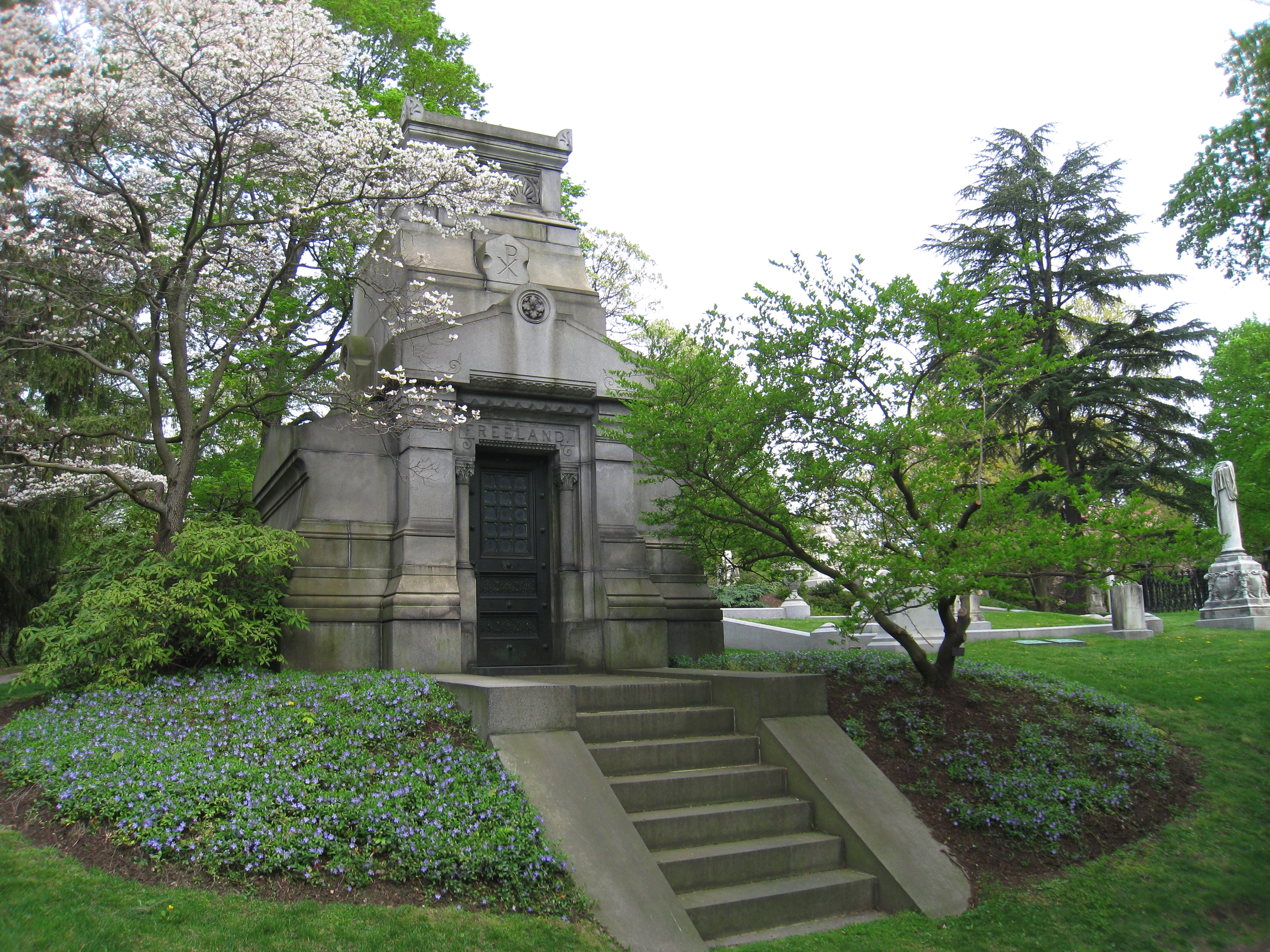
Freeland Tomb, Mt. Auburn Cemetery, Cambridge

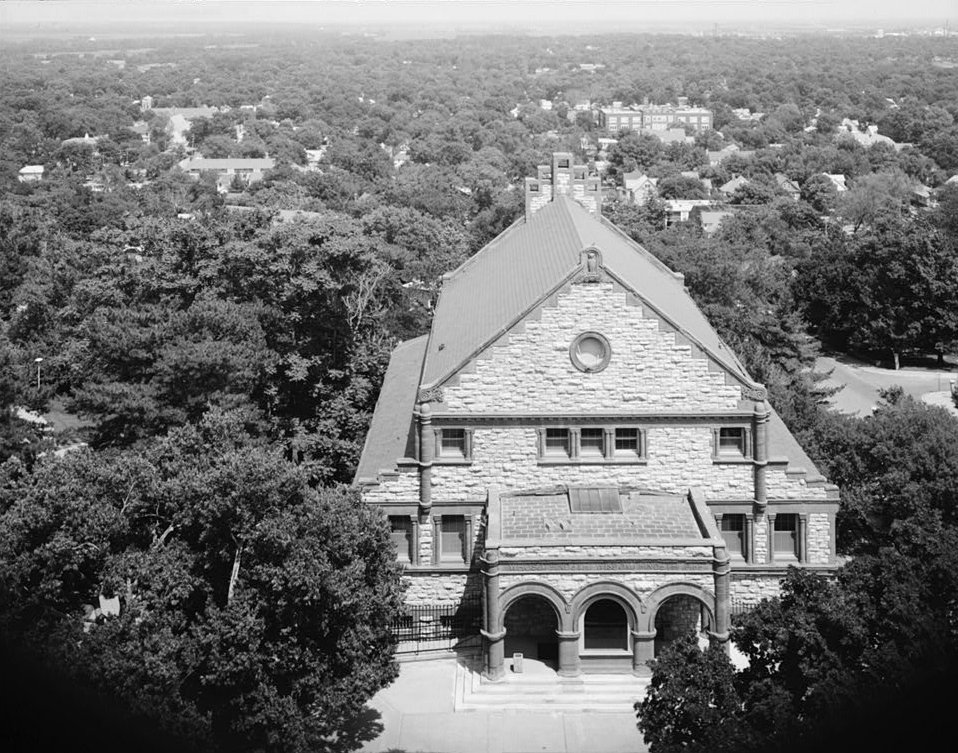
Spooner Hall, University of Kansas

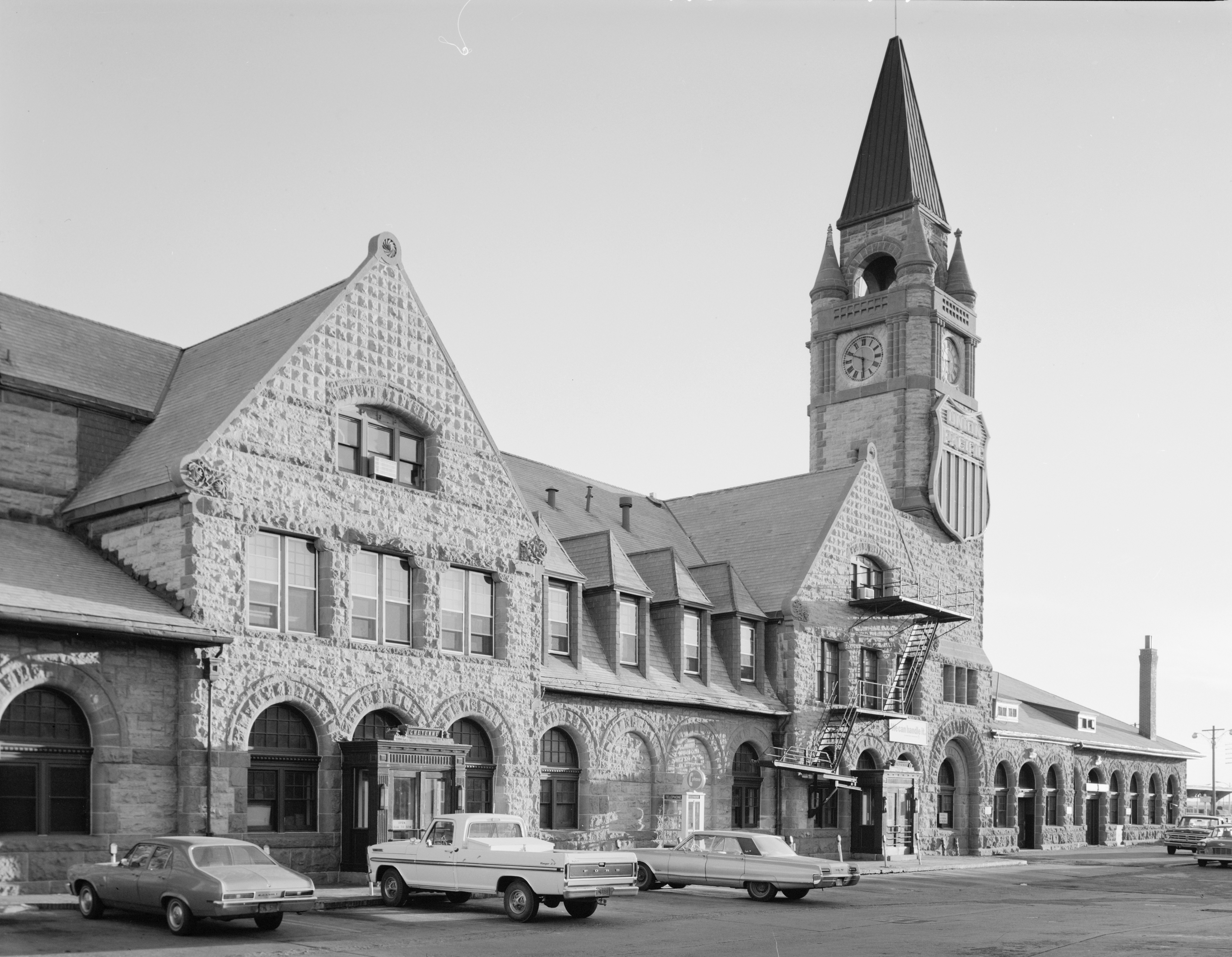
Cheyenne Union Pacific Depot

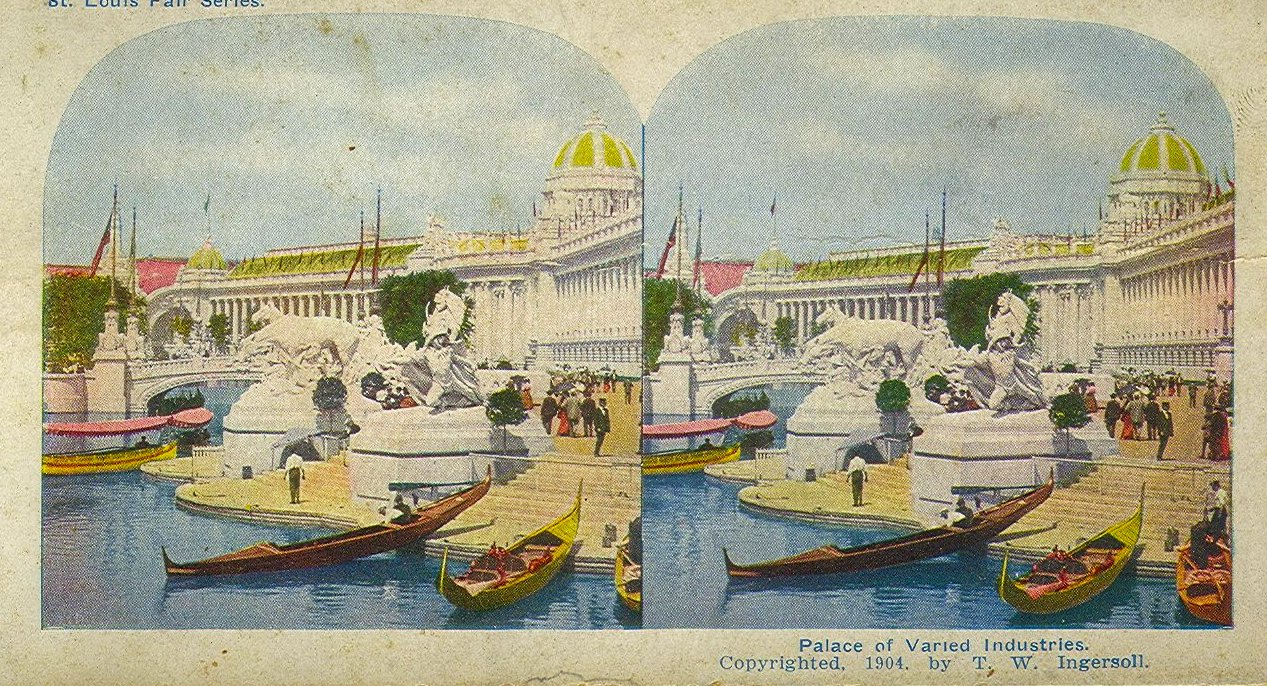
Palace of Varied Industries, St. Louis World's Fair

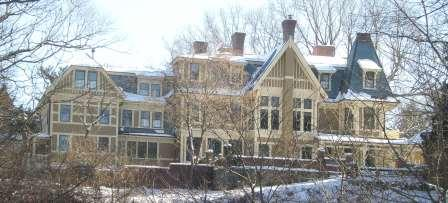
Walter Hunnewell house, Wellesley, MA (1875), Ware and Van Brunt

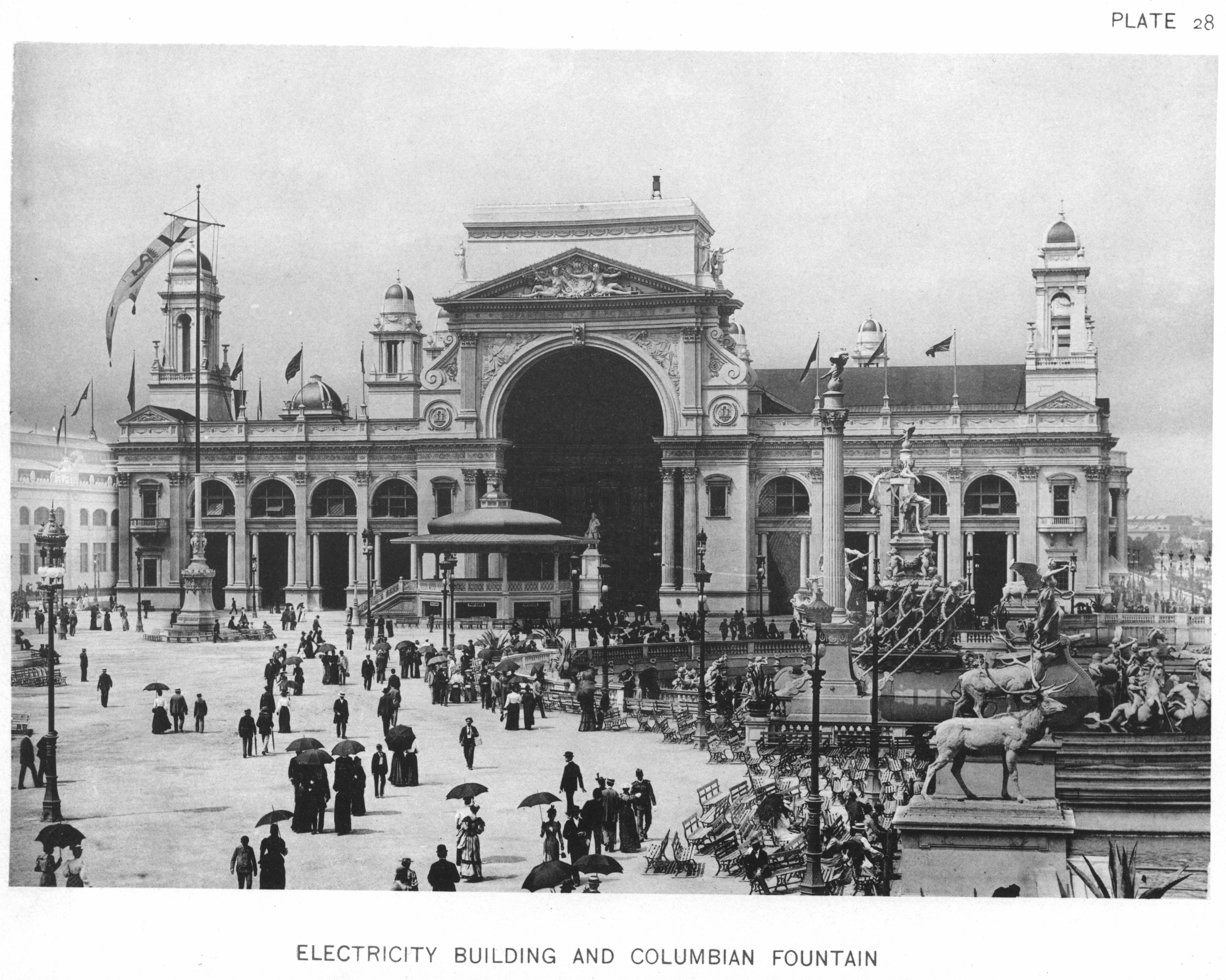
The Electricity Building on the Court of Honor, 1893 World's Columbian Exposition, Chicago. Designed by Henry Van Brunt

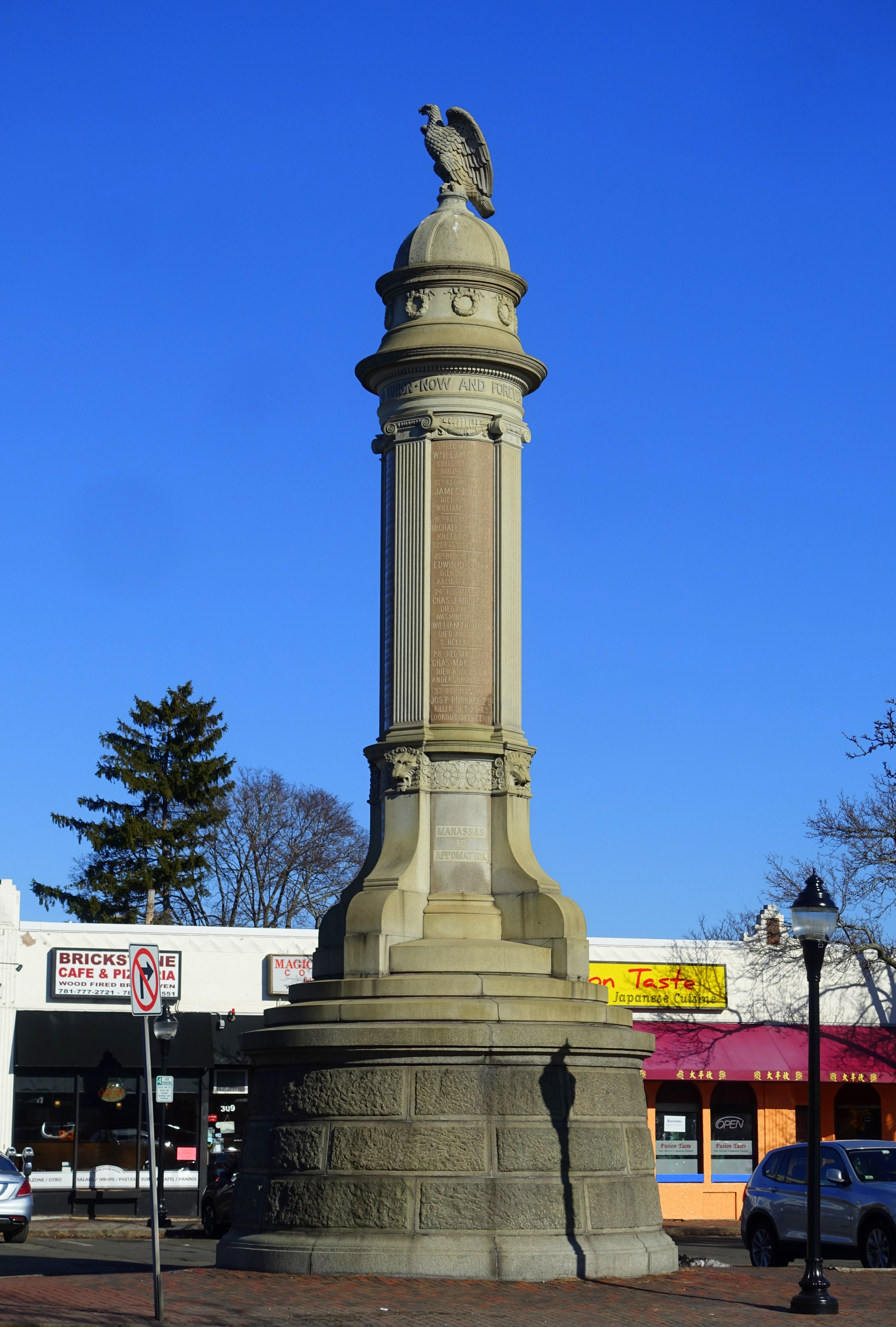
Civil War Memorial Soldiers and Sailors Memorial 1887 Arlington, Massachusetts
