= Frank M. Howe =

American architect (1849–1909)

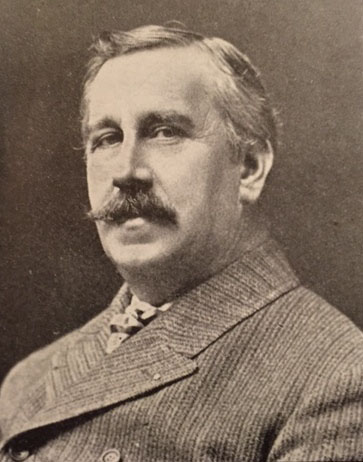
- Born: July 20, 1849; Arlington, Massachusetts
- Died: January 4, 1909 (aged 59); Kansas City, Missouri
- Occupation: Architect
- Buildings: Electricity Building at the Columbian Exposition, Chicago; Frank M. Howe Residence, Kansas City, MO

Frank M. Howe (20 July 1849 – 4 January 1909) was an architect in Kansas City, Missouri, and Boston, Massachusetts. He was a partner with Henry Van Brunt in the prominent firm of Van Brunt and Howe. He later partnered with Henry F. Hoit as Howe, Hoit & Cutler.

== Life and work ==
Frank Maynard Howe was born on July 20, 1849, in West Cambridge, Massachusetts, which later became Arlington. He attended public schools and Cotting Academy. He was part of the first class of a special course in architecture at the Massachusetts Institute of Technology (MIT). While still in school, Howe went to work for Ware & Van Brunt in 1868. William Ware and Henry Van Brunt started the Boston architectural firm in 1864. In 1881, Ware retired to become the founding chair of the School of Architecture at Columbia University. Howe then partnered with Van Brunt creating the firm of Van Brunt & Howe.

Van Brunt & Howe had a national reputation with clients in several areas of the country. Around 1885 to 1887, Van Brunt & Howe opened an office in Kansas City that was originally managed by Howe. Van Brunt later joined Howe in Kansas City. Howe was a member of the board of consulting architects for the 1893 Columbian Exposition in Chicago. He held a similar position with the 1904 Louisiana Purchase Exposition in St. Louis. Van Brunt returned to Massachusetts after retiring where he died in 1903. In 1904, Howe partnered with two employees who were also graduates of the program at MIT, Henry F. Hoit and William H. Cutler. The firm of Howe, Hoit & Cutler became Howe & Hoit upon the death of Cutler in 1907. Two years later, Howe succumbed to heart failure and died on January 4, 1909, at the age of 59. He had been ill since the previous June and traveled with his wife and daughter (Dorothy) to Great Britain, Holland, Germany, and France prior to his death.

Howe was married in 1871 to Mary Elizabeth Wyman, of Arlington. They had two daughters, Katherine (Munger) and Dorothy. They designed and built a home in 1887 at 1707 Jefferson Street in Kansas City. The building has been listed on the National Register of Historic Places. Howe belonged to the Papyrus Club in Boston, the Kansas City Club, the Kansas City Commercial Club, was president of the Knife and Fork Club, president of the Philharmonic Society, and was a thirty-second degree Mason, and Shriner.

Joining the American Institute of Architects in 1899, he was president of the Kansas City chapter in 1901 and 1908. He was named a Fellow of the American Institute of Architects (FAIA) in 1901.

== Notable buildings ==
=== Van Brunt & Howe ===
- 1883 - William Washington Gordon Monument, Wright Square, Savannah, Georgia
- 1886 - Coates House Hotel (Rebuilding) Listed on the National Register of Historic Places in 1972
- 1887 - Frank M. Howe Residence (Designed by Howe) Listed on the National Register of Historic Places in 1985
- 1890 - Emery, Bird, Thayer Dry Goods Company Building
- 1893 - Electricity Building and the Wyoming Building, World's Columbian Exposition, Chicago (demolished)
- 1894 - Spooner Hall, University of Kansas, Lawrence, Kansas
- 1904 - Palace of Varied Industries, Louisiana Purchase Exposition, St. Louis, Missouri (razed)

=== Howe, Hoit & Cutler ===
- 1905 - Independence Boulevard Christian Church
- 1907 - R.A. Long Building Listed on the National Register of Historic Places in 2003
- 1908 - Temple B'nai Jehudah (Mohart Multipurpose Center)

== Gallery ==
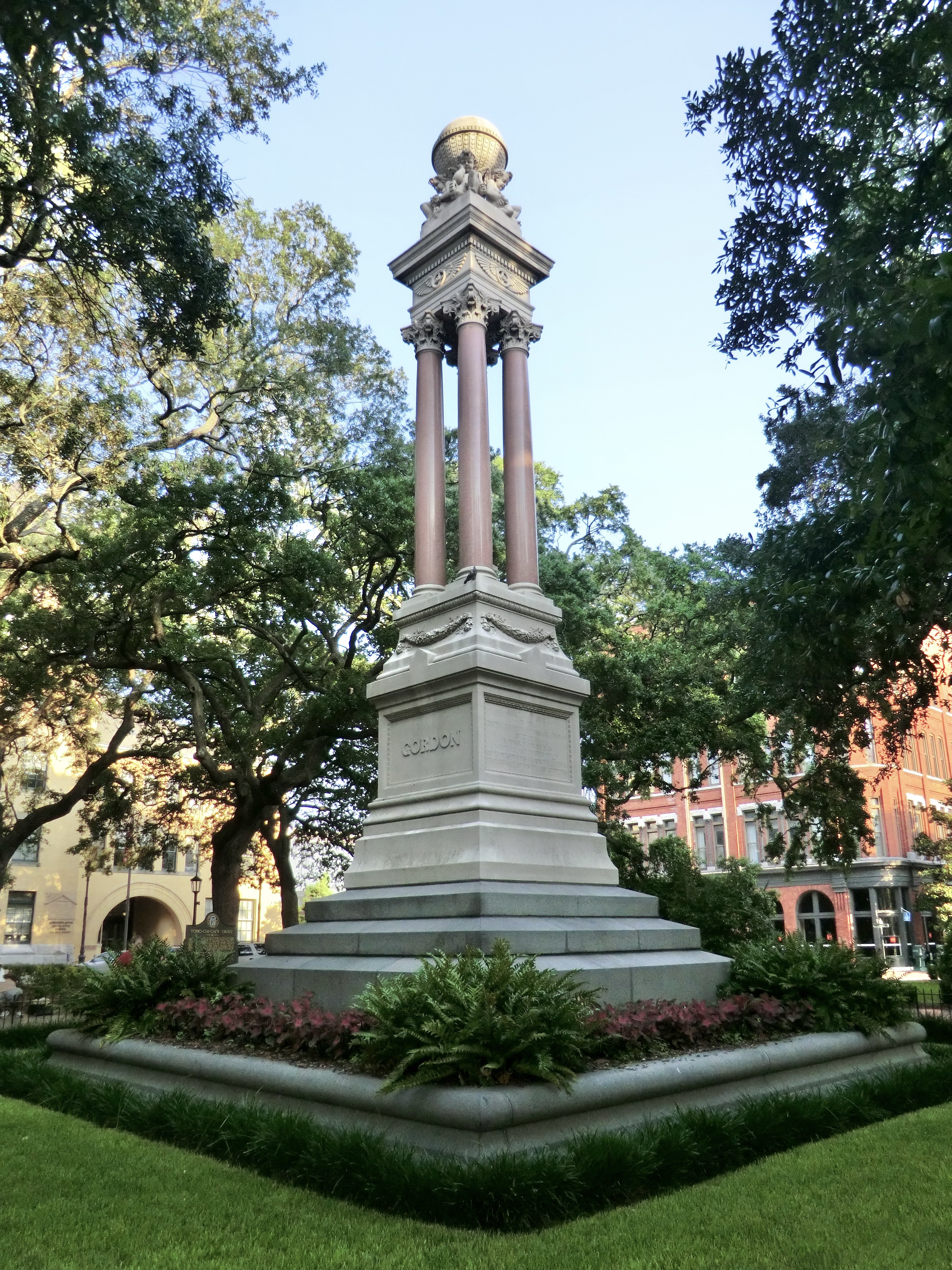
William Washington Gordon Monument

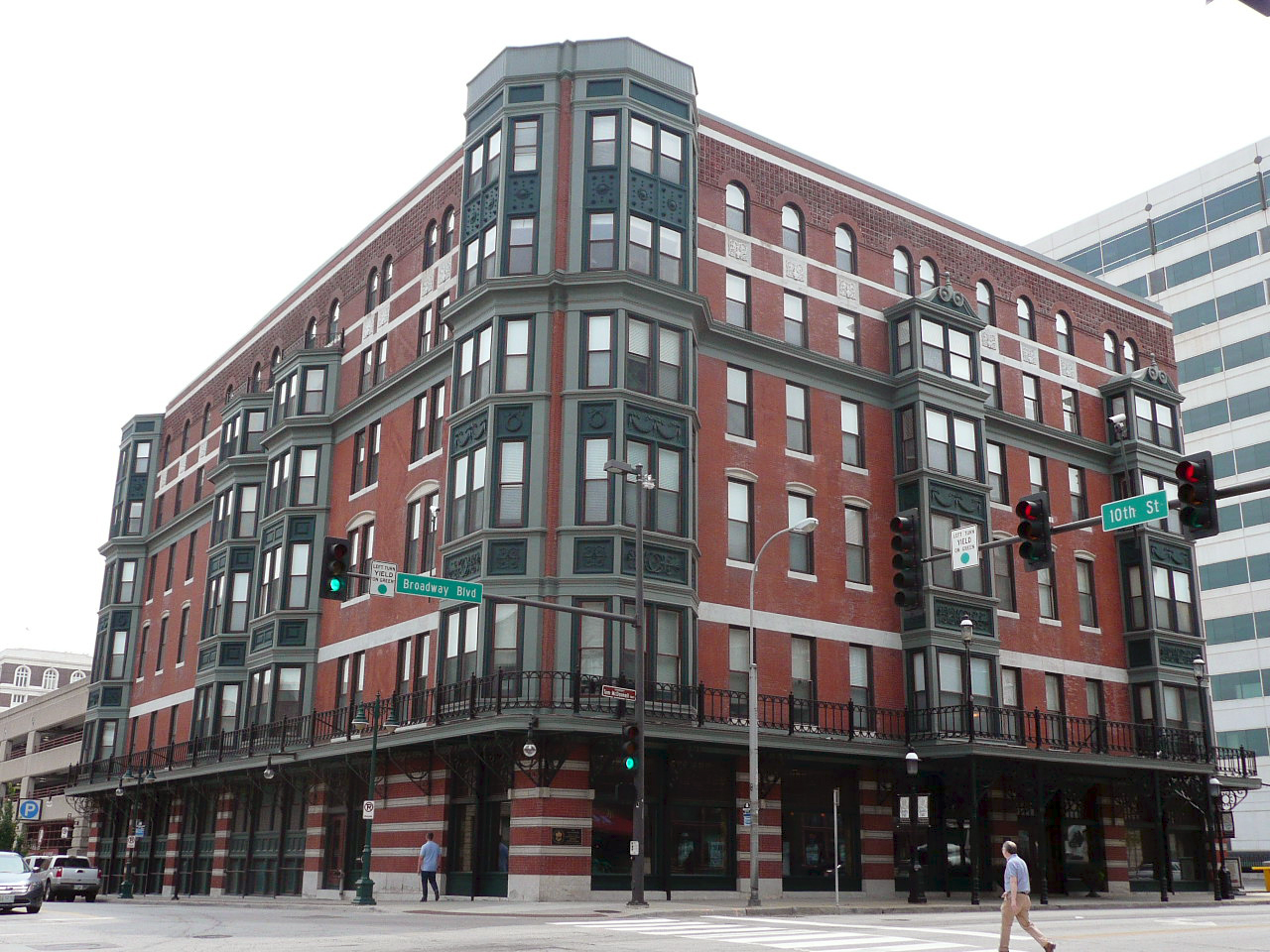
Coates House Hotel

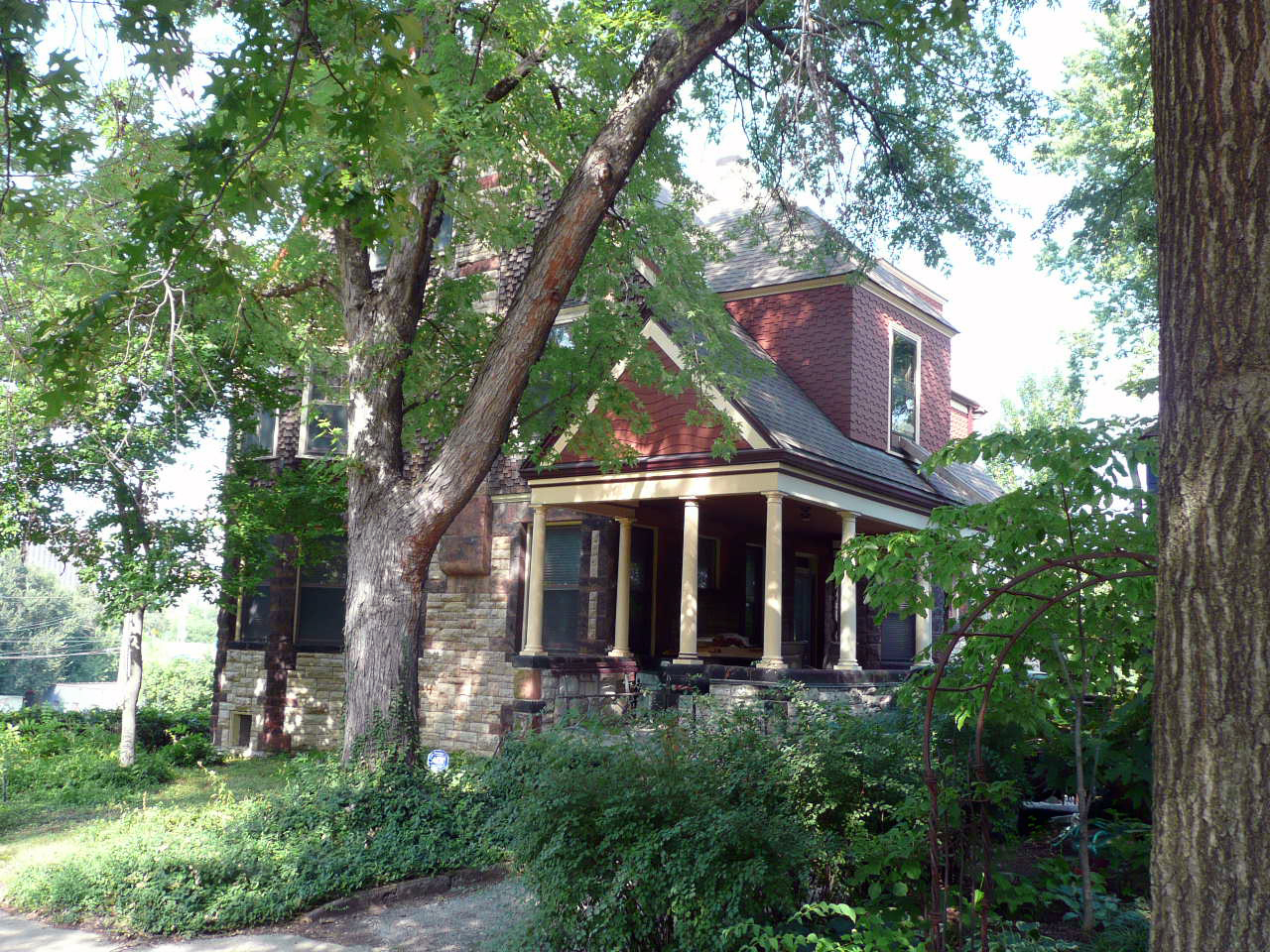
Frank M. Howe Residence

Emery, Bird & Thayer Building

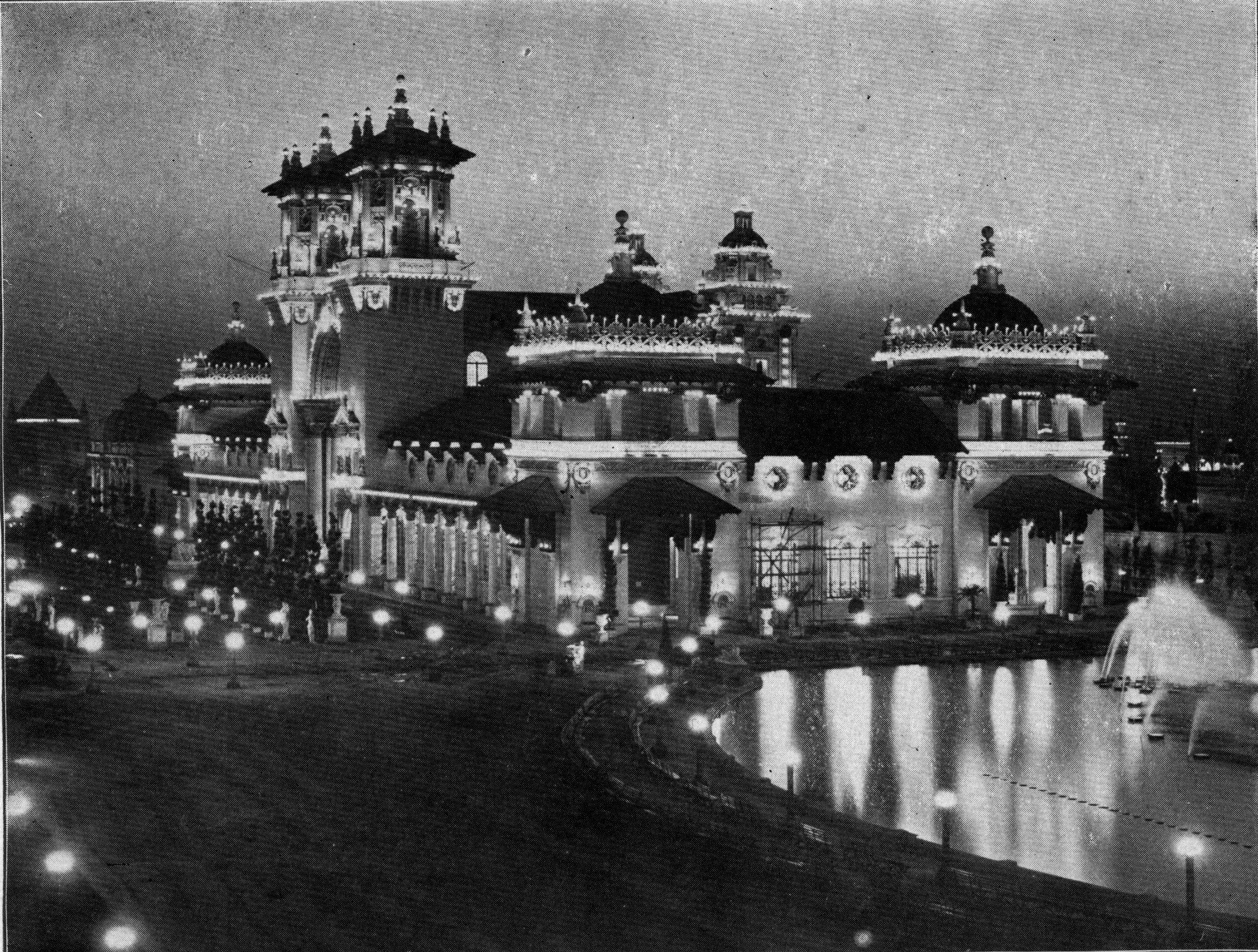
Electricity Building, 1893

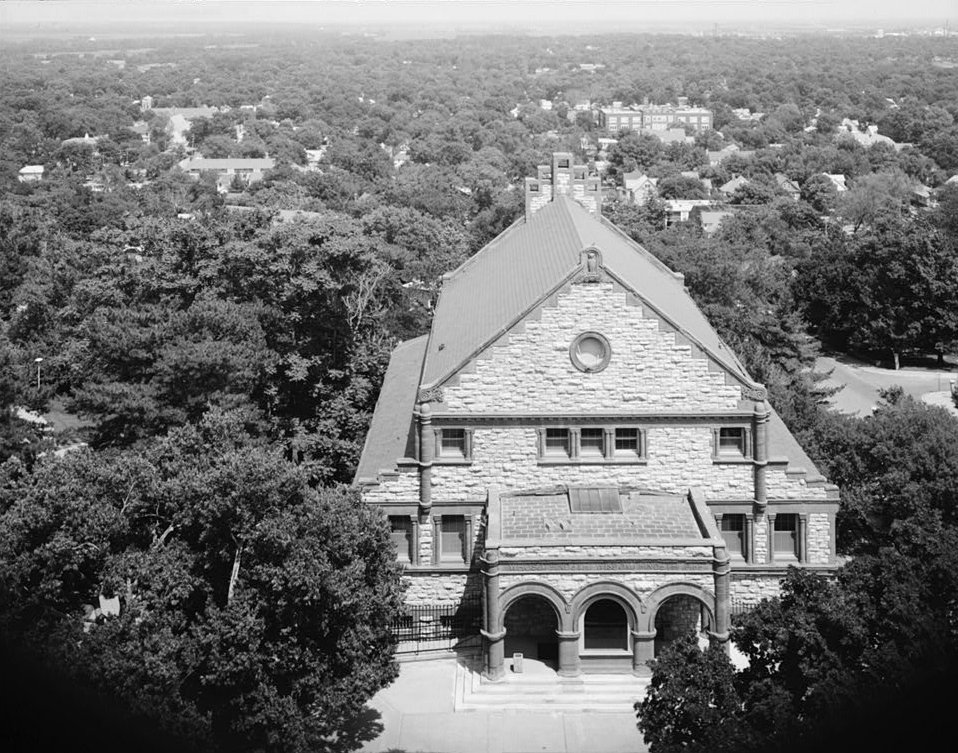
Spooner Hall, University of Kansas

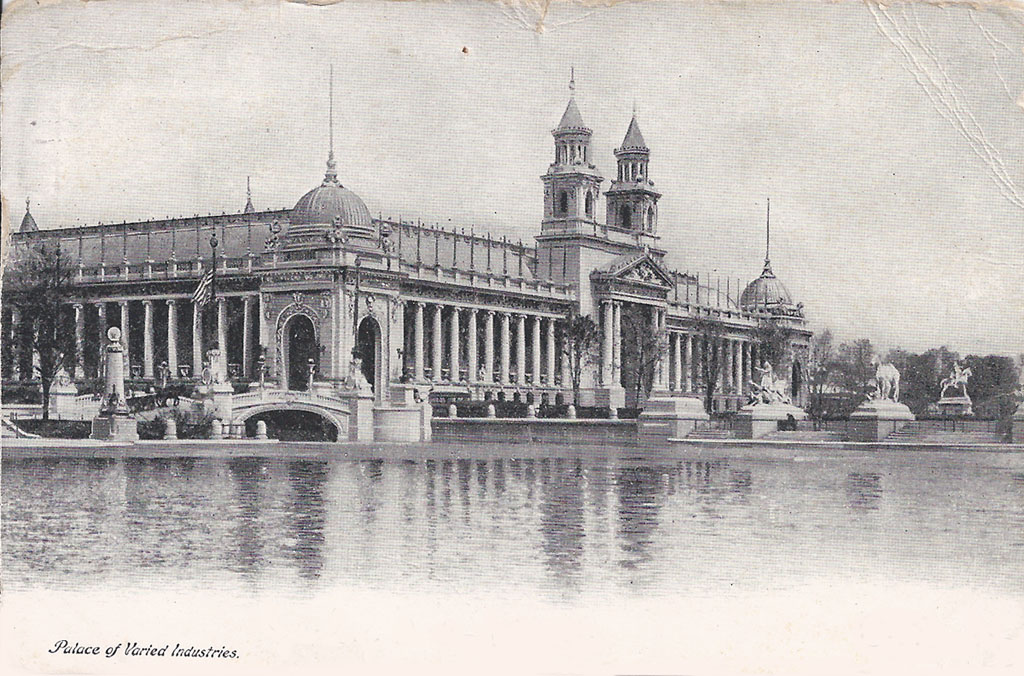
Palace of Varied Industries
1904 St.Louis World's Fair

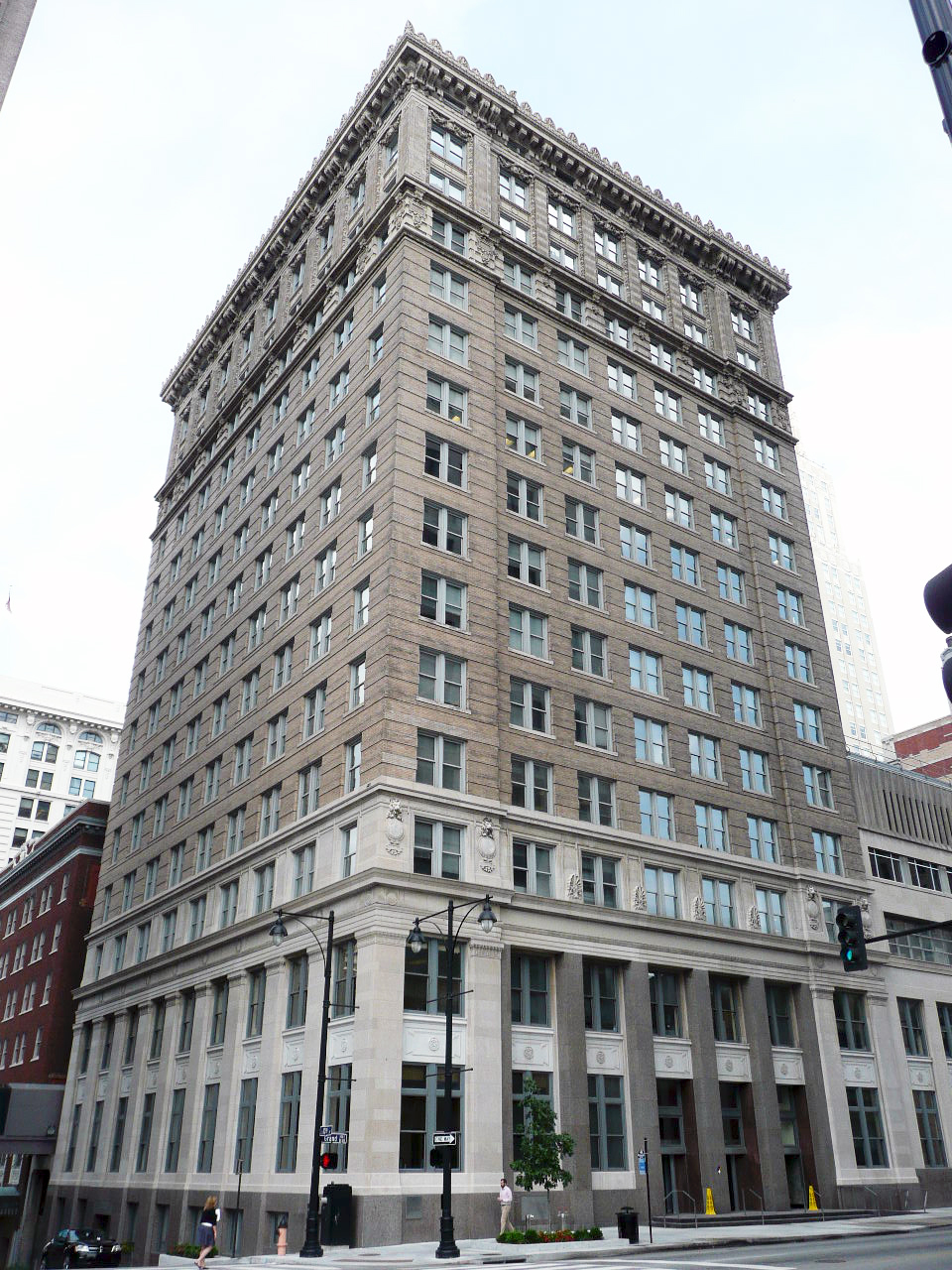
R.A. Long Building

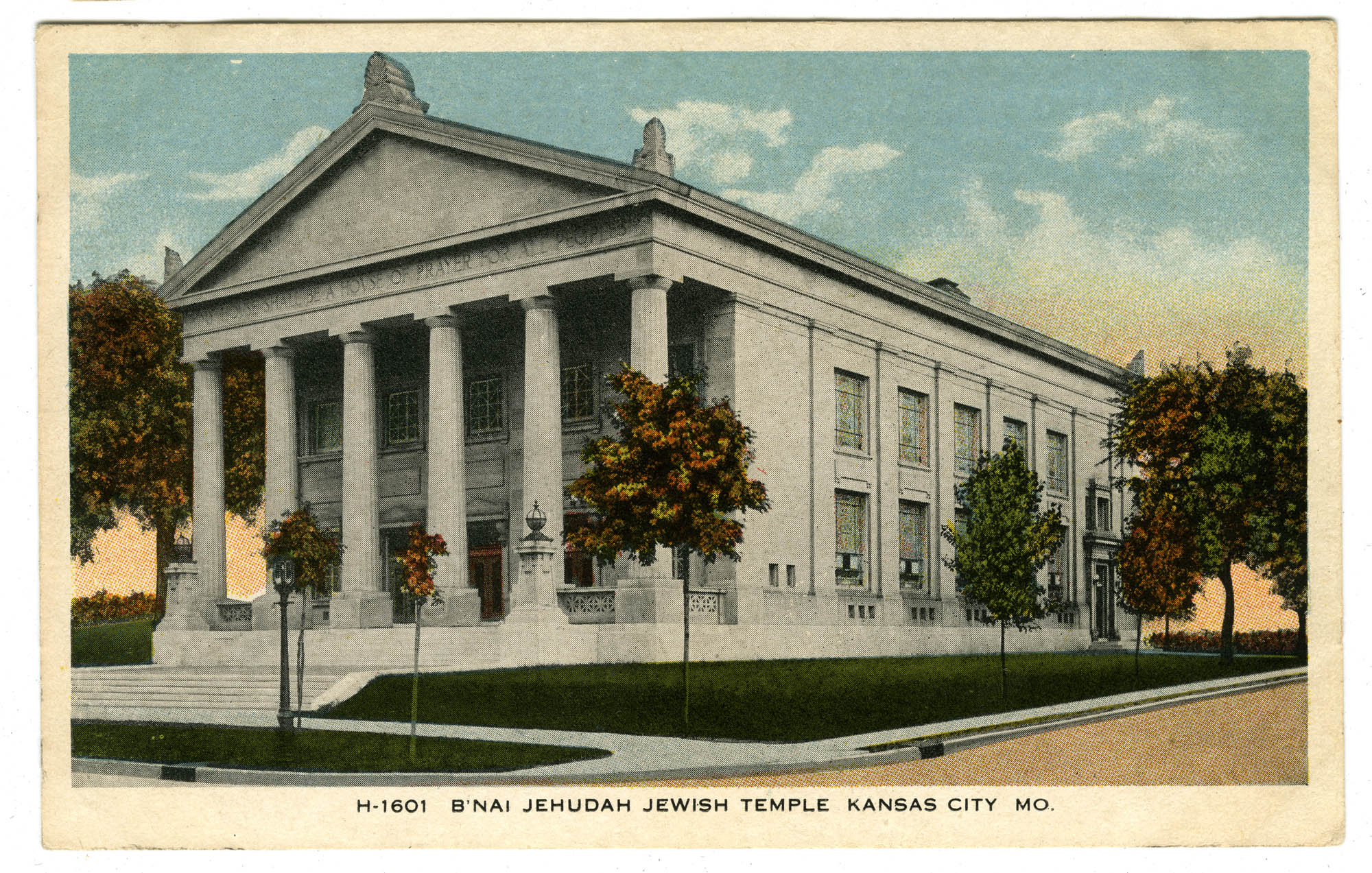
B'nai Jehudah Temple
