= Louisiana and Texas Lumber War of 1911–1912 =

The Louisiana and Texas Lumber War of 1911–1912 was a series of worker strikes that fought for better conditions in sawmills in the Piney Woods of west Louisiana and East Texas. These sawmills underwent attempts to unionize that were opposed by lumber companies and owners. The union workers were known as the Brotherhood of Timber Workers (BTW), a branch of the Lumber Workers Industrial Union (LWIU), which was affiliated with the Industrial Workers of the World (IWW). The Brotherhood tried to recruit mill workers by giving speeches and conducting meetings at various mills. Although they had limited success in Louisiana, the LWIU became very successful from 1917 to 1924.

One event sparked the Grabow shootings, which caused the death of three union men and one company worker.

== Mills ==
Louisiana alone produced 8% of national lumber output. While originally land was owned by many smaller mills, over time saw larger mills being formed, converting in a smaller group of owners and operators. Additionally, more capital was needed as railroads and other technological advances were needed as the mills spread further away from the large cities. The owners of these mills had seen increased wealth as the economy had boomed and as a result, had become very powerful within the region.

Two of the largest mill companies was The Kirby Lumber Company owned by John Henry Kirby, who played a major role in the lumber war, and Long-Bell Lumber Company. Kirby had twelve mills which employed about 6,000 men. Seven mills were owned by Long-Bell, which had about 3,500 employees. Other owners included Richard H. Keith, William Henry Sullivan, Robert Alexander Long and C.B. Sweet had vast timber holdings and many mills, as did Joseph Bentley, John Barber White (1847–1923) and his son Raymond White in 1913 with the Louisiana Central Lumber Company and Oliver Williams Fisher.

The large sawmill owners were accustomed to union activities and made plans to prevent unionizing. They formed several industry organizations, such as the Southern Lumbermen, who collaborated on freight rates, wages, and work hours. They also collaborated to deal with shortages of railroad cars, establish uniform wages and hours, and limit competition. They kept up with the labor situation and prevention of unionization. The Southern Lumbermen's Association, Southern Lumber Manufacturers' Association, Southern Lumber Operators' Association, Yellow Pine Manufacturers' Association, and Texas and Louisiana Saw Mill Association were examples of the cooperation among industry lumbermen. They were opposed to any labor organizing.

Alongside the mills, were company-owned towns. These towns consisted of housing for the workers, a store owned by the mill, and other enterprise owned and operated by the company. Since the towns were usually completely owned and operated by the mill, the companies exercised great power over the workers and could expel them from housing for union activities. Long-Bell was one of many very large companies that built many sawmills and towns. The Missouri Lumber and Land Exchange Company (Exchange Sawmills Sales Company), associated with the Missouri Lumber and Mining Company, had sawmills in Grandin and West Eminence, Missouri, and the Ozark Land and Lumber Company in Winona, Missouri. The Louisiana Central Lumber Company had mills in Clarks (1902), adding the Standard mill in 1906; the Louisiana Long Leaf Lumber Company had mills in Fisher and Victoria; and the Forest Lumber Company had a mill in Oakdale by 1913). In 1918 the Louisiana Sawmill Company built a mill in Glenmora, and the White-Grandin Lumber Company founded one in Slagle near Leesville. The mill complexes included feeder railroad lines constructed by the companies, which also owned all the land. Pacific Northwest Labor and Company/

To ensure that mill hands were and remained loyal, the owners required them to verbally profess loyalty, sign a non-compete clause, and, before it was ruled illegal, sign a Yellow-dog contract promising not to join a union. The companies used blacklisting against activist employees; given the cooperation between mills, if a man was blacklisted, he usually could not get work at any mill. Many mill companies paid wages in company scrip rather than cash. Scrips were only good only at the mill worked at, so if a man was fired, he would be unable to find work, would have no place to live, and would have no cash with which to ease his transition. This was compounded even more if a mill worker had family, and gave mill owners an absolute power and Timber magnates showed they could be vindictive. A strike would also result in a lockout and outside workers brought in.

The way to gaining more profit in the lumber industry lay in saving money everywhere possible. Sawmills were set up along major railroad lines for access to shipping, the best locations were picked, and a mill town built. The towns contained everything a community would need. The housing was laid in rows on streets with street lights. The houses had electricity, water, indoor plumbing and sewer, and was furnished. The yards were landscaped with white fences. The mills provided large commissaries, schools, churches, theaters, hotels, a post office and doctors office. There was a fire department, barber shop, and sawmills around DeRidder received ice from the Hudson's Bay Ice Company. A Ford's Opera House was built for entertainment for workers. There were bunkhouses for single men.

Workers were racially segregated in housing and other areas. These accommodations were for mill workers and spur tracks were laid to the timber and remote camps were set up for the lumbermen that were housed and fed in tents. The conditions in the woods were dangerous and less than desirable, with long hours and starting pay from $.75 to $1.50 a day. Lumberjacks had longer working hours than most other workers in the country.

From the 1870s states began passing laws to help labor. Secretary of Labor William B. Wilson (1913 to 1921), under President President Woodrow Wilson, was friendly to labor and Congress passed many labor-friendly laws during this time. Most were either struck down or limited by the Supreme Court, especially during the Lochner era.

== Unions ==
These uprisings centered around the Lake Charles and Alexandria in 1906–1907 and helped create the forces that would fight the timber war of 1911–1912. The Brotherhood of Timber Workers met in May 1912 in Alexandria, Louisiana, where they voted to affiliate with the powerful and militant Industrial Workers of the World (IWW). This alarmed the Southern Timber Association, which represented the mill owners. The Brotherhood of Timber Workers declared their intention to fight battles in DeRidder and within a 30-mile radius of it. DeRidder was then considered the center of labor unrest—it was the last area to return to work during the 1906–1907 strikes. It was seen by owners as the center of militant union activity. Both sides defined the area of conflict to be around northern Beauregard Parish (at the time still a part of Imperial Calcasieu Parish). The riot at Grabow and the ensuing court trials became the crucial events in the struggle to unionize the workers, bringing the conflict to a legal head with high national visibility. A strike and lockout on November 11, 1912, at the American Lumber Company mill at Merryville, Louisiana, about 20 miles west of DeRidder was instigated deliberately by the owners, led by association president John Henry Kirby of the Kirby Lumber Company of east Texas. The timber workers' union had been infiltrated by agents of the Burns Detective Agency who were on the payroll of the owners' association. As a result, Kirby knew that the union was in serious financial trouble because of the lengthy court proceedings following the Grabow Riot. Although the local union had affiliated with the IWW, the IWW gave no financial help, choosing to focus its efforts and priorities on the Northwest Pacific Coast timber war.

To cause a strike that would cripple the union financially, the Association blacklisted all union members associated with the Grabow riot. This gave the American Lumber Company at Merryville a pretext to dismiss 18 workers who had testified for the defense at the Grabow riot trial. The union then had no choice but to go out on strike again. This strike ruined the union financially and organizationally when in November 1912 the strikers' headquarters and soup kitchen in Merryville was attacked and destroyed by agents and friends of the mill owners. The strikers and union leaders were routed and they retreated to DeRidder. The strike was broken and the mills reopened in May 1913 using non-union labor.

These three events, occurring within six months of the Grabow riot, marked the end of the 1911–1912 Louisiana–Texas timber war. The union continued to exist as a shell until 1914, but the mills were never organized by the labor unions. This set the stage for further anti-unionism in the oil fields of Louisiana and east Texas.

By the end of 1921, the Piney Woods of Louisiana and Texas had been completely cut down, ending a 30-year boom for west Louisiana and east Texas. No effort was made by the timber companies to conserve or restore the Piney Woods, which many had thought could never be logged out. The ensuing recession left many sawmill towns deserted, including Grabow. Most of them, like Carson, Bon Ami, Neame, Ludington, and Hall, are largely forgotten; Grabow itself is remembered mainly for the riot.
