= Kingston and Choctaw Valley Railroad =

Industrial railway in the United States

Overview
- Headquarters: Kansas City, Missouri
- Locale: Oklahoma
- Dates of operation: 1898–1901

Technical
- Length: 12 mi (19 km)

The Kingston and Choctaw Valley Railroad (K&CV) was a short-lived industrial railway serving the lumber industry in the later days of Indian Territory, in what is now Le Flore County in the State of Oklahoma. Twelve miles in length, it ran from Thomasville to rail connections at Howe.

== History ==
Besides having coal, the land that would become Le Flore County upon Oklahoma statehood was covered with forests, leading to a prosperous early lumber industry. The town of Howe developed as a transportation center, with the Kansas City, Pittsburg and Gulf Railroad (bought in 1900 by the Kansas City Southern Railway) building through in 1895–1896, and the Choctaw, Oklahoma and Gulf Railroad (later leased to the Chicago, Rock Island and Pacific Railway) arriving in 1898.

In 1897 the Long-Bell Lumber Company purchased property at Thomasville, Indian Territory, on the flanks of the Winding Stair Mountains, Wilton Mountain, and other peaks in the Ouachita Mountains. The company created a subsidiary called the King-Ryder Lumber Company, and King-Rider proceeded to build a lumber mill at Thomasville. As part of the overall effort, the company constructed the Kingston and Choctaw Valley Railroad within the year period following June 30, 1898. This was not unusual for a Long-Bell operation, as it built at least three other railroads—the Alexandria, Woodworth & Beaumont Ry, the Shreveport, Alden Bridge & Camden Ry, and later the Louisiana & Pacific Railway-- all headquartered in Kansas City. Nor was it unusual for the industry; for example, Dierks Forests, through its subsidiaries the Texas, Oklahoma and Eastern Railroad and the De Queen and Eastern Railroad, operated 91 miles of track through Arkansas and Oklahoma.

The K&CV started just south of Thomasville, passed through that location, and proceeded north through the ephemeral settlements at Perry, Houston and Nail, then passed over the Poteau River to Petros, Oklahoma, also known as Petross Mill, where Dierks Forests had sited a wood planing operation. From there, the line continued north through Heavener to terminate at Howe. This gave the line a total length of about 12 miles.

King-Ryder ceased milling at Thomasville about 1901, relocating instead to Bon Ami, Louisiana. The rail line was abandoned around this time. Thomasville was later reborn as Stapp, Oklahoma, with a post office opening in 1918. It hosted a Buschow Lumber Company sawmill. An eventual casualty of its own “cut and move on” policy, the Buschow mill closed in 1932, and the post office followed in 1944. Nothing is now left of the old town.
