= Robert A. Long =

American lumber baron and real estate developer (1850–1934)

Robert Alexander Long
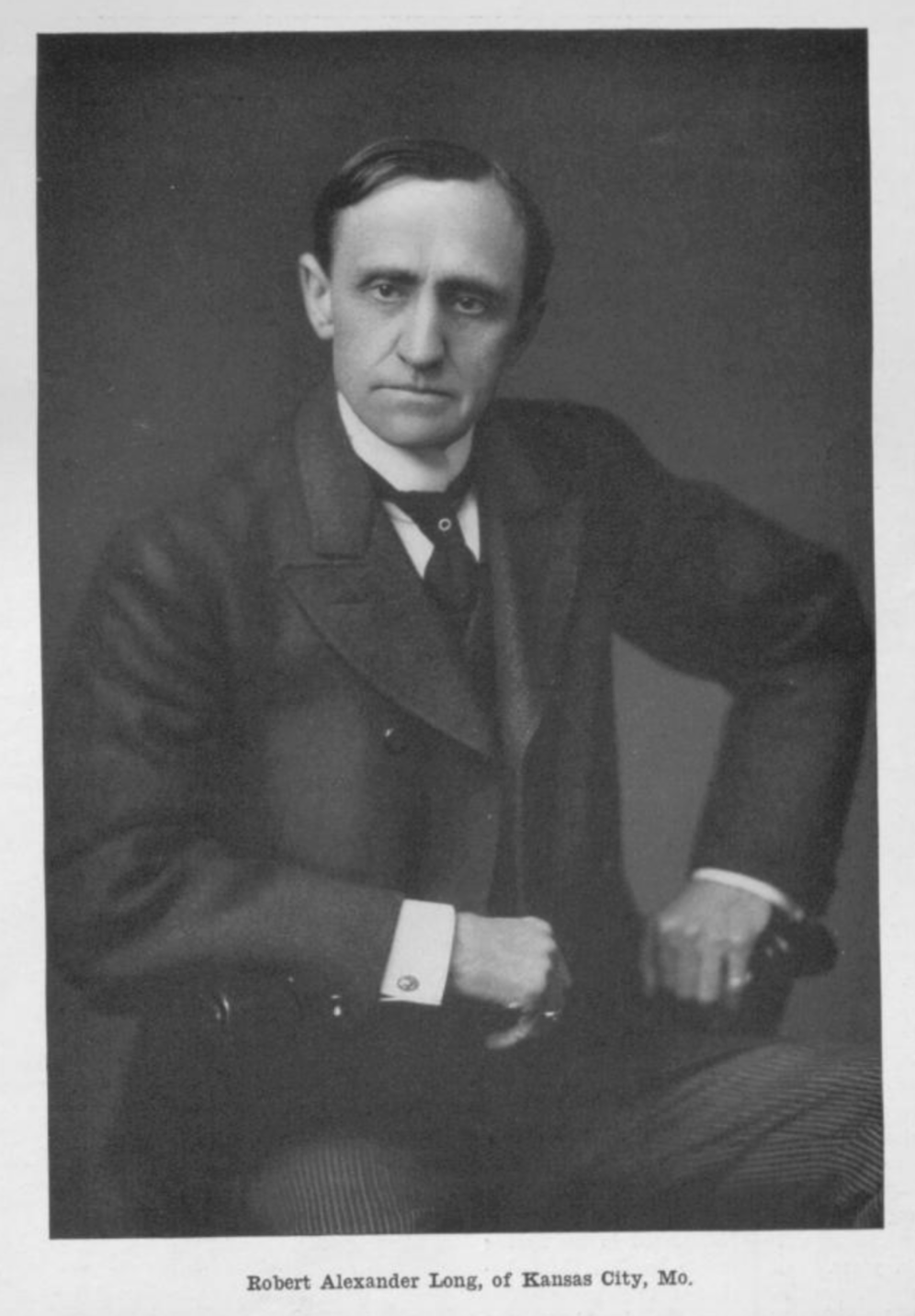
- Born: December 17, 1850; Shelbyville, Kentucky, U.S.
- Died: March 15, 1934 (aged 83)
- Resting place: Forest Hill Calvary Cemetery
- Occupations: Co-founder of Long-Bell Lumber Company, real estate developer
- Known for: Liberty Memorial; namesake of Longview, Washington and Longville, Louisiana,

Robert Alexander Long (December 17, 1850 – March 15, 1934) was an American lumber baron, developer, investor, newspaper owner, and philanthropist. He lived most of his life in Kansas City, Missouri and founded Longview, Washington and Longville, Louisiana.

By 1906, Long owned 250,000 acres (1,000 km^{2}) of pine in Arkansas, Oklahoma, and Louisiana and converted it into 61 lumberyards. As the timber land was deforested in Louisiana, he moved west to the state of Washington and bought 270,000 acres (1,100 km^{2}) of Douglas fir. Long eventually owned many acres of land and buildings, spanning the United States from Washington D.C. to the state of Washington.

== Early years ==
Long was born December 17, 1850, in Shelbyville, Kentucky, one of nine children born to Samuel M. Long and Margaret Kinkead White. His mother was a cousin of Joseph Clay Stiles Blackburn and Luke P. Blackburn. Three of Long's older brothers, Thomas, E. S. and Belvard, served in the American Civil War but Robert was too young.

Long moved to Columbus, Kansas in 1873 where his uncle, C. J. White, was a banker. In 1874, Long met 19-year-old Martha Ellen Wilson. She was a Quaker and became a school teacher. After a year of courtship the two were married December 16, 1876. A son lived only a few weeks but the couple had two daughters. In 1879, Sally America Long (Ellis) was born, and in 1881 their youngest daughter, Loula Long (Combs; d. 1971) was born.

== Career ==
Long started a hay bale company along with his cousin Robert White and a friend, Victor B. Bell; the hay venture failed but the three were able to sell the lumber from the hay sheds. Seeing that lumber was in demand they ordered more lumber. Business was good and the partners opened more yards. In 1877 the youngest partner, Robert White, died and the remaining partners bought out his share. Robert and Victor formed the Long-Bell Lumber Company in Columbus, Kansas.

While in Columbus, he bought 1,520 acres (620 ha) and developed a profitable coal mine with two shafts at Stone City. The location is found only on historical maps, as the town no longer exists today, but was just east of NW 40th street south of the junction of NW Meir road, which is northwest of Columbus.

=== Long-Bell Lumber Company ===
In 1887, Robert A. Long and Victor Bell formed the Long-Bell Lumber Company in Columbus, Kansas. The headquarters was moved to Kansas City where it remained until sold.

In 1889, Samuel H. Wilson, Robert's brother-in-law, who began with the company in 1887, took over the retail department, a position he held until his death on October 20, 1903. In 1891, the capital stock was increased to $500,000. The Long-Bell Lumber Company was vertically integrated from the forest to the lumber yard and became the world's largest lumber company in the early 20th century.

Long-Bell Lumber Company filed for bankruptcy in 1934, then filed a reorganization plan in the Kansas City federal court in 1935, after Long's death.

=== Louisiana ===
When the railroad entered Louisiana Robert Long was among the earliest to set up shop. He purchased land in many parts of the state to begin lumber harvesting to supply the needs of his giant lumber company.

In 1900, the Long-Bell Lumber Company organized the King-Ryder Lumber Company at Bon Ami, Louisiana. By 1904 the mill was producing 300,000 board feet of lumber daily which made it the largest in the area at the time. In 1903, Long-Bell organized the Hudson River Lumber Company in DeRidder and built a sprawling mill across the tracks from Washington street. Kansas City Southern Railroad and the Santa Fe Railway ran through Deridder.

On March 16, 1906, Long-Bell Company bought out two mills of the Bradley-Ramsey Lumber Company in Lake Charles. This included 105,000 acres (42,000 ha) and 36 miles of the Lake Charles and Leesville railroad and was renamed the Lake Charles and Northern Railroad. This purchase included seven locomotives and 120 log cars and a total of 58.599 miles of tracks. The new rail formed part of the Atlantic System of the Southern Pacific Company. In October 1906, a new location (sections 25 and 30, township 5, of range 8 west) was cleared along the route for the Longville Long Leaf Lumber Company'and town. The company built the three-story, 60-room "Southern Hotel", 163 cottages for workers, a large commissary with $30,000 worth of supplies, an elementary and high school, a complete machine shop, roundhouse, car repair shop, and blacksmith shop. There was also a two-story fire department building, providing around the clock service, that started with a horse-drawn wagon then a fire truck, the First National Bank, a barbershop, and the Dixie Theater.

Circa 1913, Long-Bell acquired the Ludington Lumber Company and transferred 3000 acres (for $157,000) to shore up the stumpage (uncut lumber) reserve. When the mill burned in 1920, there were an estimated 2500 residents in the town meaning it rivaled Fullerton. With the stumpage reserve dwindled the mill was not rebuilt so the town began to disappear. The planer was converted to a hardwood flooring mill, which was moved to DeRidder in 1927 when all operation at Longville ceased.

=== Unions ===
Unions had been operating in many industries, such as the railroads and coal mines in the United States as early as 1870, and played an important part in securing a better working environment and pay. Coal miners benefited from unions because their work under ground was poorly ventilated causing Pneumoconiosis also known as black lung (and even referred to as P-45),] was a fact of life. Railroad worker unions succeeded in getting rid of the "old man-killer" link and pin coupler.

Union organization began at Carson, Louisiana, led by Arthur Lee Emerson and Jay Smith in December 1910. Other areas such as Lake Charles, Merryville, and Eastern Texas soon followed. They met in Alexandria in June 1911 to established the Brotherhood of Timber Workers (BTW). The Southern Lumber Operators' Association had been created by member mills in 1906 to stop any future union organizations. The association took immediately plans to include lockouts, importing strikebreakers, hiring the Burns agency, Pinkerton detectives, and other steps with the purpose of destroying the union.

John Henry Kirby, that owned the American Lumber Company in Merryville, Louisiana, did hire agents to infiltrate the union. Other mills either imported workers or closed mills. After the incident at Grabow suspected union workers were fired. There were no laws to protect unions such as the Erdman Act for interstate railroad workers. The cases of Allgeyer v. Louisiana (1897), and the landmark case of Lochner v. New York (1905), defined a period of federal jurisprudence known as the Lochner era that, while it was acknowledged that states have certain "police powers," effectively deprived states of the ability to administer labor protections and regulate private enterprise, resulting in considerable market autonomy. It was not until 1955 that the Lochner era came to a close.

Employees of many sawmills were required to sign yellow-dog contracts to prove loyalty to the company and agree not to join unions. The union office in Merryville was destroyed, and within three months union activities ceased.

C. B. Sweet, of the Long-Bell Mills, chose not to honor the lockout. Sweet already paid his employees in cash and made other concessions and there did not appear to be any union action directed at the Long-Bell company sawmills in Louisiana. This was not to be the case with the Longview, Washington sawmill and other areas of the country.

=== Washington ===
He founded the city of Longview, Washington, a "planned city" built in 1923 near two of Long-Bell's lumber mills. He personally donated funds for the city's public library, first high school, train station, YMCA hall and its Hotel Monticello. The mills were advertised as the largest in the world.

A newspaper was planned along with the city and on January 27, 1923, the first issue of Longview News came off the press.

Long was the principal stockholder until his death on March 15, 1934, and in a family trust until 1947. In 1981 the paper won a Pulitzer Prize for coverage of the 1980 eruption of Mount St. Helens.

=== Other businesses ===
Long was an early investor in the Kansas City Southern Railroad, a source of transportation for his raw material and products. Longview Development Company was formed for handling real estate in Longview, Washington.

== Structures affiliated with Long ==
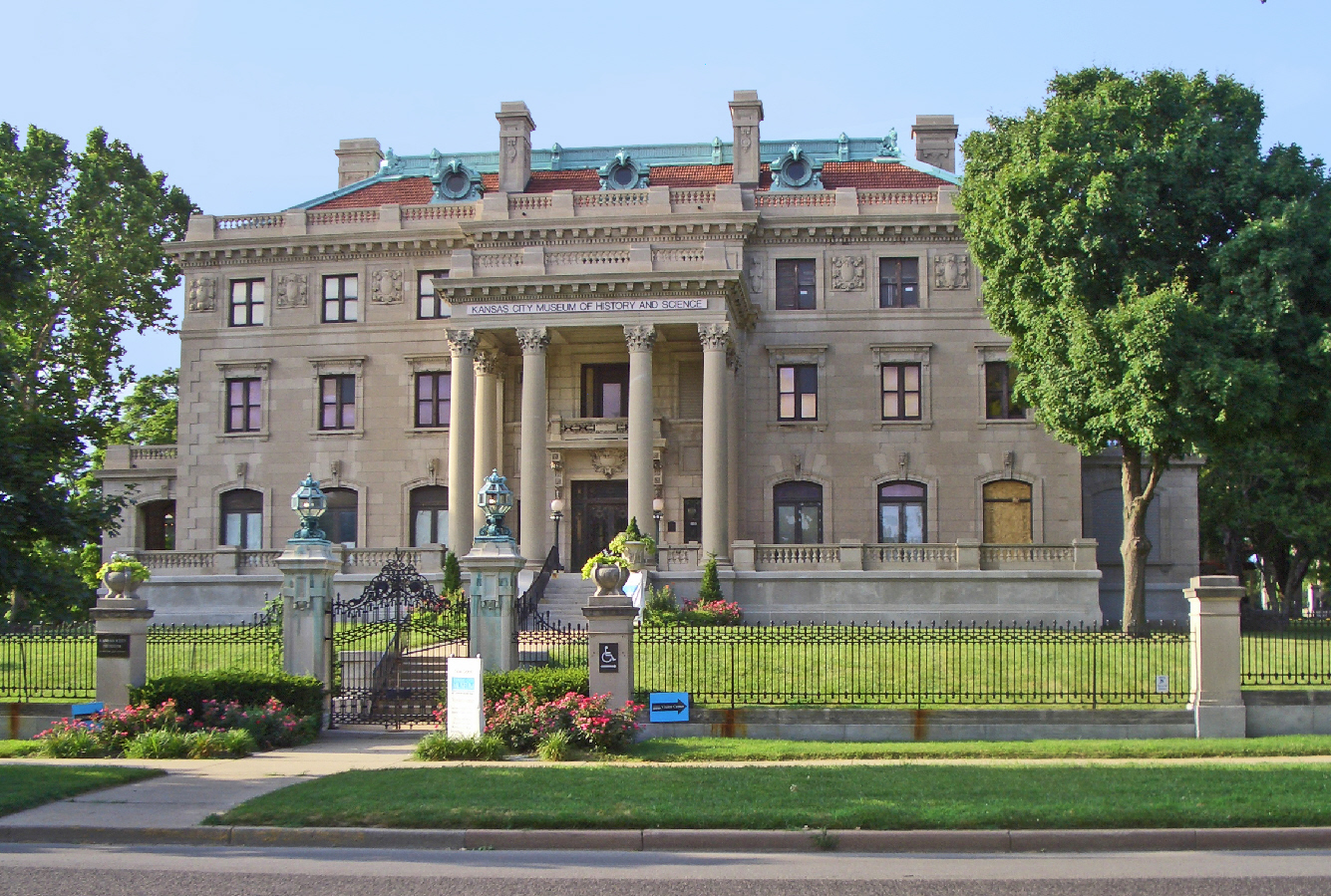
Corinthian Hall, Long's former residence, now the site of the Kansas City Museum.

=== Corinthian Hall ===
Long's home in Kansas City, named Corinthian Hall, was completed in 1911. The 72-room French Renaissance mansion, located on Gladstone Boulevard, was Kansas City's first million-dollar home, is now the Kansas City Museum. On November 14, 1980, the building was entered into the NRHP.

=== R. A. Long Building ===
In 1907 the R.A. Long Building, a Beaux-Arts skyscraper in downtown Kansas City was built at 928 Grand Avenue. On January 8, 2003, the building was listed in the NRHP.

=== Longview Farm ===
Longview Farm was built in 1913–1914, in eastern Jackson County, on the outskirts of Kansas City. The 2,000-acre (8.1 km^{2}) farm had 42 buildings, 250 acres of clipped lawns, extensive flower beds, and four greenhouses; in later years fresh carnations and gardenias were shipped daily. Portions of the farm are now sites of Longview College and of Longview Lake. The farm was listed on the NRHP on October 24, 1985.

=== Liberty Memorial ===
Long was a driving force behind the creation of Kansas City's Liberty Memorial, a World War I museum and monument. He was the president of the Liberty Memorial Association and a major contributor. In less than a year the organization collected $2,500,000. The monument was dedicated on November 11, 1926.

=== R.A. Long High School ===
The R.A. Long High School was a gift to the city of Longview, Washington in 1928 from Robert Long. The building is listed on the National Register of Historic places. The school was one of several buildings that Long built from personal funds.

== Associations ==
Long was involved in the Christian Church (Disciples of Christ), as well as his family, until his death. Loula remained faithful to the Longview Chapel Christian church (Disciples of Christ) until she died and was celebrated as one of the longest attending members.

Long was active in several associations. Long was the president of the Southern Pine Association founded in 1915. The name was changed in 1970 to the Southern Forest Products Association with a division being the Southern Pine Council and is still active today. Long belonged to the National Lumber Manufacturers Association.

His other associations include:

- The American Christian Mission Society
- The National Brotherhood of Disciples of Christ
- An organizer of the Pension Plan and Trustee of the Pension Fund of the Disciples of Christ
- The Christian Board of Publication. A large publishing house for religious books of faith that he purchased.
- The International Convention of Christian Churches
- Men & Millions Movement of the Christian Church
- Trustee of the Bible College of Missouri

== Death and legacy ==
Long died on March 15, 1934. He was buried at Forest Hill Calvary Cemetery. In Longview, Washington, a bronze bust of Long, by Alonzo Victor Lewis, was placed in the renamed R. A. Long Park on August 24, 1946.

In 1956, International Paper Company (IP) purchased all remaining holdings of the Long-Bell Lumber Company and renamed it IP-Long-Bell. With the lumber depleted and the mill being antiquated, IP-Bell ceased operations in 1960 and the mills were dismantled and sold. Some of the giant old-growth beams were used to build Microsoft-founder Bill Gates’ mansion in Medina on Lake Washington.

The R. A. Long Historical Society was formed in 2006.

== See also ==
- Grabow Riot
- Hoit, Price and Barnes

== Sources ==
- Biography of Robert Alexander Long from A Standard History of Kansas and Kansans, written and compiled by William E. Connelley, Secretary of the Kansas State Historical Society, Topeka. Chicago: Lewis Publishing Company, copyright 1918
- Robert A. Long (PDF), speech by J.C. Nichols, April 30, 1925.
- History of Longview, Washington
- Liberty Memorial web site
- Kansascity.com
- "Ours to Give: The Long Legacy of an American Family", Video Documentary
- R. A. Long Historical Society
- Long history
