= Covington Hall =

American labour activist (1871–1952)

William Covington Hall (August 25, 1871 – February 21, 1952), who also wrote under the pen names Covington Ami and Covami, was an American labor organizer, newspaper editor, writer, and poet. Hall was an active member of the Industrial Workers of the World (IWW) and rose to some prominence within the organization. Hall played a major role in the Louisiana-Texas Timber War and the United Fruit Company strike of 1913. He spent most of his life in Louisiana, particularly in New Orleans.

== Early life ==
Hall was born on August 25, 1871, in Woodville, Mississippi to a well-off family. His father was a Presbyterian minister. His family soon moved to Louisiana and lived in Terrebonne Parish on his family's sugar plantation until it was foreclosed upon in 1891, an event which prompted Hall to move to New Orleans where he took up a series of jobs including selling insurance. The loss of his family land and the Thibodaux massacre played a major role in forming Hall's political beliefs. It was during the Panic of 1893 that he joined the Socialist Party. While Hall supported the socialist cause, he also supported Democratic nominee William Jennings Bryan in the 1896 Presidential election. Hall was associated with "The Reds" of the Socialist party and became a leader of this more radical wing of the party.

While he was in New Orleans, he became friends with Oscar Ameringer, who wrote for Labor World. Hall became assistant editor of the newspaper until 1907.

He was adjutant general of the Sons of Confederate Veterans. Hall might have been unique within the organization as an opponent of racial segregation. He ended up losing his position with the organization after he wrote several articles over the topic that strongly went against the views of most of the members of the group.

== IWW ==
He joined the IWW in 1905 when it was first formed. He didn't take any official roles within the leadership of the IWW but he became a prolific writer about labor movement and the activities of the union, members of which were nicknamed the Wobblies. He also wrote hundreds of poems about the movement and other causes. He was called the Wobbly Poet.

Hall joined the Brotherhood of Timber Workers (BTW) and brought the union into the IWW; it was there he started his first newspaper The Lumberjack, which would cover union activities and the Louisiana-Texas Lumber War of 1911-1912. It was during this period that the Grabow riot occurred, which caused the death of four people. In the aftermath, sixty-four union members were arrested. Hall was at the massacre but was one of the few people not arrested. He pressed for coverage from other labor newspapers and began a national publicity campaign to gather money and resources to defend the union members during their trial. In the end, all union members were found not guilty and released.

Unlike other unions at the time, the IWW had a policy of integration of all races. There was no segregation within the union; however, implementation of that policy wasn't fully accepted in all unions yet, especially in areas where Jim Crow laws were fully in place. Hall became an outspoken advocate of complete integration. At one union meeting at the start of the timber wars, Hall encouraged the two segregated unions to meet together. Without any dissent from the workers, all meetings of the BTW from then on were integrated.

Hall did disagree with the IWW's policy of exclusion of farmers and other agrarian workers. He tried to convince other leaders within the IWW but his ideas failed to gain traction and he was forced to work outside of the IWW to unionize farmers. His group, called the Rebel Clan of Toil, grained some traction during the years of 1915–1917, but owing to several factors, failed to meet their goals. It was during this time that he edited the monthly magazine Rebellion.

Hall, like most members of the IWW, opposed the First World War. During the war, he joined the Nonpartisan League.

== Writings ==
In addition to the newspapers he edited, Hall was a prolific contributor to most IWW affiliated magazines, journals, and newspapers including writing to the Industrial Worker in the 1940s. He used pen names as Covington Ami and Covami.

There have been several collections of his poetry published including: Songs of Love and Rebellion (New Orleans: John J. Weihing Printing Co., 1915), Rhymes of Rebel (New Llano: Llano Co-operative Colony Printery, 1931), Quivara, or The Quest of Alvarez (Rogers: Avalon Press, 1946) and Battle Hymns of Toil (Oklahoma City: General Welfare Reporter, 1946). After his death Dave T. Roediger edited Dreams & Dynamite: Selected Poems (Chicago: Charles H. Kerr Publishing Company, 1985) and Kevin I. Slaughter edited Covington Hall's Satanic Lumberjacks and Southron Rebels (Baltimore: Underworld Amusements, 2019).

He wrote his memories entitled Labor Struggles in the Deep South & Other Writings in the 1940s. The book covered most of his life until the 1920s.

== Later life ==
The labor wars and the general decline of the IWW led to Hall living a less activist life after the 1920s. He had several other jobs including being an assistant librarian in New Orleans. He also taught at Commonwealth Labor College Arkansas, and at Work People's College in Duluth, Minnesota.

Hall died in New Orleans on February 21, 1952, at the age of 80. Little is known about his personal life and circumstances.
