= Petros, Oklahoma =

Unincorporated community in Oklahoma, US

Coordinates: 34°52′10″N 94°36′32″W

Petros is an unincorporated community in Le Flore County, Oklahoma, United States. It is located approximately two miles south of Heavener, Oklahoma and one mile north of the Poteau River.

== History ==
A post office was established at Petros, Indian Territory on January 21, 1898; it closed on March 30, 1901. At the time of its founding, Petros was located in Sugar Loaf County, a part of the Moshulatubbee District of the Choctaw Nation. The community was also known as Petross Mill, and was first known as Petros Cut. The name is Greek for rock, and was named by Greek immigrants working on the Kansas City Southern Railroad, who cut solid rock for the railroad's right-of-way.

Dierks Forests sited a wood planing operation in Petros. At one time, the settlement was on the line of the Kingston and Choctaw Valley Railroad, which extended from Thomasville in the south north through Petros and Heavener to rail connections at Howe, Oklahoma.
