= The Daily News (Longview, Washington) =

Daily American newspaper

- A sample front page of The Daily News
- Type: Daily newspaper
- Format: Broadsheet
- Owner(s): Lee Enterprises
- Founder(s): Robert A. Long
- General manager: Matt Sandberg
- Founded: January 27, 1923
- Language: English
- Headquarters: 770 11th Avenue; Longview, Washington 98632
- Country: United States
- Circulation: 9,141 Daily (as of 2023)
- ISSN: 0889-0005
- OCLC number: 13781223
- Website: tdn.com

The Daily News is a newspaper covering Longview, Kelso, Washington, and Cowlitz County, Washington in the United States. Apart from a brief period in the 1990s when, prior to ceasing publication, the Cowlitz County Advocate was published in Longview, the Daily News has been Longview's only newspaper since its inception.

== History ==
Ralph Tennal published the first issue of The Longview News on Jan. 27, 1923. The paper was financed by Robert A. Long, a lumber magnate who was president of Long-Bell Lumber Company and founded the city of Longview. Tennal quit after a few months and Long hired John Morgan McClelland Sr. to replace him as the paper's editor. On April 2, 1923, The Longview News began publishing daily and was renamed to The Longview Daily News, and then The Daily News. McClelland partnered with Long to create the Longview Publishing Company and purchase the newspaper from the Long-Bell Lumber Company in 1925.

McClelland Sr. retired in 1955 and turned over operations to his son John McClelland Jr. Ted Natt and John Natt, grandsons of McClelland Sr., sold the newspaper to Howard Publications in 1999, ending 76 years of McClelland-Natt family ownership. Lee Enterprises acquired the newspaper in 2002.

Starting June 27, 2023, the print edition of the newspaper will be reduced to three days a week: Tuesday, Thursday and Saturday. Also, the newspaper will transition from being delivered by a traditional newspaper delivery carrier to mail delivery by the U.S. Postal Service.

== Pulitzer Prize ==
The Daily News covered the eruption of Mount St. Helens in 1980, and won the 1981 Pulitzer Prize for Local, General, or Spot Reporting, as well as the 1981 national Sigma Delta Chi Award. Following the death of the paper's publisher in a helicopter crash, the Associated Press established the regional Ted Natt Award for First Amendment journalism in 1999.
