= Justice Overton =

Justice Overton may refer to:

- Ben Overton (1926–2012), associate justice of the Supreme Court of Florida
- Winston Overton (1870–1934), associate justice of the Louisiana Supreme Court
