= Grabow riot =

1912 incident in Louisiana, US

- Date: July 7, 1912
- Location: Grabow, Louisiana
- Goals: Better pay and working conditions
- Methods: Strike, shootout

Parties
Brotherhood of Timber Workers	Galloway Lumber Company's private police

Casualties
- Deaths: 4
- Injuries: 50
- Arrested: 58
- Charged: Murder; all were acquitted

The Grabow riot or Grabow massacre was a violent confrontation that took place between private police hired by management and labor factions in the timber industry near Grabow (Graybow), Louisiana, on July 7, 1912. The clash left three union workers and a company security employee dead, including union leader Asbury Decatur ("Kate") Hall, and an estimated fifty wounded. It was a crucial event in attempts to organize locals and unionize sawmill workers in Louisiana and east Texas in a series of events known as the Louisiana-Texas Lumber War of 1911-1912.

There had been unrest for years in western Louisiana and eastern Texas as workers tried to organize to gain better conditions in the industry. At Grabow the main factions involved were the Galloway Lumber Company and a party of striking unionized mill workers and their supporters. The union workers were known as the Brotherhood of Timber Workers (BTW), a branch of the Lumber Workers Industrial Union (LWIU), which was affiliated with the Industrial Workers of the World (IWW). The Brotherhood tried to recruit mill workers by giving speeches and conducting meetings at various mills. Although they had limited success in Louisiana, the LWIU became very successful from 1917 to 1924.

In October 1940, Congress passed the Wages and Hours Act (later the Fair Labor Standards Act); this was upheld by the United States Supreme Court on February 3, 1941.

== Background ==
Wanting better working conditions and pay, workers at the little sawmill town of Grabow, Louisiana, had organized and joined the Brotherhood of Timber Workers. This was part of what is considered the 1911–1912 timber war fought between timber companies and workers in the Piney Woods of west Louisiana and east Texas. The companies had organized to cooperate in setting conditions such as wages, and most employed private police or militias to suppress union activities and labor unrest.

Given the state of arms and control, violent confrontations were frequent over labor issues in Beauregard Parish during this period. The BTW had announced its intention to strike against the major mills in DeRidder, Louisiana, and the surrounding area, and the mill owners and operators were determined to shut down the mills, and lock out and blacklist union workers before acceding to their demands. But the Hudson River Lumber Company, the Long-Bell Lumber Company's subsidiary in DeRidder, was not part of the Southern Lumber Operators Association. It honored the Brotherhood of Timber Workers (BTW) and paid cash rather than scrip to workers.

== Grabow riot ==
On July 7, 1912, the union workers held a series of rallies at several different company towns including Bon Ami and Carson, Louisiana. The day started out with over 800 workers, women, and children at DeRidder. Covington Hall and Arthur L. Emerson, two of the leaders of the strike, gave speeches. The group, with twelve wagons, marched the six miles to Carson for more speeches and to attempt to sway the non-union workers to join the BTW. The rally had no trouble in Carson before deciding to head back to Bon Ami. On their way, the group was warned by their scouts that gunmen were waiting to attack the march on the road back. Some choose to continue on the road and they saw no trouble. Another group decided to take a longer way through Grabow. At Grabow, the remaining group, which number around 200, decided to break for lunch. Grabow had a number of non-union workers and it was quickly decided to hold a rally with speeches. This instantaneous decision soon led to a violent confrontation. Emerson spoke on top of a wagon to roughly 25 non-union men plus the additional union men who had come with him.

Shots were fired, resulting in 4 deaths and 50 wounded in a shoot-out of around 15 minutes and an estimated 300 shots. There is considerable debate on who fired first. While there were some unorganized single shots, the first organized firing came from the mill office, where four men, including the owner John Galloway, had been waiting for the march. This group had spent the day drinking. Some of the union men did have weapons and returned fire. One of the participates who was with the union was notorious gunman Charles ("Leather Britches") Smith. He boasted of killing over six men, but it's clear that this story was a work-of-fiction. His boosts caused much resentment amongst the lumber company men. He was killed a few months later on September 25, 1912, from a shootout with a deputy and three local men.

The Louisiana National Guard was called out and arrived the next day but there were no further acts of violence and they withdrew shortly after. The local sheriff arrested non-union and union men soon after the shooting. The owner of the mine, Galloway, was one of those arrested and was accused of murder by a coroner's jury in DeRidder; however, no formal charges were presented and he was released, along with six of the arrested company men. Over thirty of the union men, including Emerson, who were at Grabow were arrested in the next few days. Judge Winston Overton started a grand jury investigation. Overton was considered hostile to the union. Subsequently, 65 of the timber workers' group were brought up on charges ranging from inciting a riot to murder.

The BTW, along with the IWW, sprung into action to help fire several well-known defense attorneys. Fundraising rallies occurred in several cities, one in New Orleans just two days later. Bill Haywood, one of the founders of the IWW used his considerable might at these rallies and it became the cause célèbre of the union world. Union papers also wrote articles and tried to influence their version of the events. Arrests continued, with the small local jail of holding fifty-five men by the end of July, leading to the Louisiana State Board of Health ordering the prisoners moved to the basement of the courthouse. The Burns Detective Agency were hired to collect evidence for the prosecution.

On October 7, after several delays, the trial started in Lake Charles, Louisiana. One of the prosecutors was current Congressman Arsène Pujo. The trial lasted until November 8. The jury returned the verdict of not guilty for all of the union men. The evidence that the company men had been drinking all day and were likely to be the first ones to fire seems to have swayed the jury. All of those arrested were set free.

There is a historical marker at the site of the riot, on what is now the property of DeRidder Airport, Louisiana.

=== Personal account ===
Below is an excerpt from the newspaper article "A Year of Death", which appeared in the Beaumont Sunday Enterprise-Journal, Section C, September 15, 1974. It details the recollections of Seab Rogers about the Grabow riot of July 7, 1912. Rogers was 79 years old at the time of the article.

The International Workers of the World [sic] was organizing sawmill workers and every non-union mill was (a) target. A.L. Emerson was the organizer making the sawmill rounds and speaking on this particular Sunday.

Rogers picks up the story as an eyewitness: "We had been to Merryville, Singer, Newlin and Carson and were headed for Bon Ami. Before we could get there someone came up and warned that Bon Ami was filled with gunmen and that we'd certainly be killed if we went there.

"There was 15 wagon-loads of us. Most of the men were armed. We headed for Grabow instead. I was driving the lead wagon, a brand new one pulled by a span of mules. Emerson was in my wagon.

"Somewhere along the way Emerson traded hats and coats with Decatur Hall. It was about 3:30 in the afternoon when we pulled up before the Grabow office and the shooting started right off.

"Three men were killed in my wagon. "Kate" Hall went down first, I guess they figured he was Emerson, what with him having Emerson's hat and coat on. Then a fellow named Martin was shot and another whose name I don't recall right off went down with him."

== Leather Britches Smith ==
Charles Smith, nicknamed "Leather Britches", wore a pistol on each hip and carried a rifle everywhere he went. He was reportedly brought in as a hired gun by Arthur L. Emerson, then president of the Timber Workers. Some considered him a hero and benefactor of the timber workers.

The legend varies. Some thought him to be a good man unless he drank, when a different side of him would emerge. Rill (Loftin) Grantham stated that Leather Britches saved her future husband from hanging shortly after the Grabow riot. Many just avoided him and some stories portray him less favourably.

=== A different man ===
Smith was also Ben Myatt of Robertson County, Texas. Arrested for the torture and vicious murder of his wife, he was brought before Judge J.C. Scott, with Frank A. Woods as prosecutor. The judge, on his own motion, ordered the trial moved to Falls County, in Marlin, Texas. Tom Connally was the prosecutor, together with Woods.

Evidence was also provided that Myatt had shot and killed a neighbor named John Cook and left him lying in a field. After he was convicted of murdering his wife in 1910 and sentenced to hang, he was transferred to Navarro County jail in Corsicana, Texas, to be tried for Cook's murder, but he escaped to Louisiana before his trial. He was shot and killed after being cornered by the police in Louisiana in September 1912.

== Community of Graybow ==
All that remains of Graybow are some bricks, a well, a mill pond, and a historical marker put there in 2003 by the descendants of the Galloway family and the Brotherhood of Timber Workers. It is still called Graybow; it is inhabited and has churches.

== Other abandoned towns and communities ==
=== Bon Ami ===
This community is now considered the outskirts of DeRidder. A street that ran to Bon Ami from DeRidder still bears the name.

=== Carson ===
Carson is located about 6.5 miles from DeRidder.

=== Ludington ===
This community is within the city limits of DeRidder and is still known to local people as Ludington.

=== Neame ===
The area known to local people and reflected on maps, situated in Vernon Parish, no longer exists. Once a thriving lumber town, the only known remnants are a mill pond about 3.5 miles north of Rosepine, Louisiana, on the east side of highway 171, and two abandoned grave sites, one surrounded by trees near the old Neame mill pond and the other on the west side of highway 171 in the middle of a field. The latter is located on property south of and adjacent to a saw mill bearing the name Neame. There are some headstones dating to the early 1900s. Most of the graves are decaying, and many have already disappeared.

== See also ==
- Anti-union violence
- Union violence
- Murder of workers in labor disputes in the United States
- List of incidents of civil unrest in the United States
