= Ariola, Texas =

Unincorporated community in Texas, US

Ariola
- Unincorporated community
- Location within Texas
- Coordinates: 30.24228700°N 94.20930200°W
- Country: United States
- State: Texas
- County: Hardin

Ariola is an unincorporated community in Hardin County, Texas, United States.

A stop on the Texas and New Orleans Railroad, the community was known as Sharon until being renamed to homogenize with the Hooks Switch Post Office—named for local sawmill owner George W. Hooks—after its establishment in 1888. Due to economic downturn, Hooks sold his sawmill to J. Frank Keith in the 1890s, who renamed the town to Ariola in 1901, for the Ariola League it was on. In 1902, John Henry Kirby bought the sawmill and demolished it in 1907. Despite its population of 108 in 1904, the post office closed in 1907.Three oil wells were discovered in the area, the first in 1932, and as of 1984, two were operating.
