= Vance Muse =

Vance Muse (born January 6, 1890, Moran, Texas; died October 15, 1950, Houston, Texas) was an American businessman and conservative lobbyist who was involved with the Right-to-work movement against the unionization of American workers, and helped pass the first such laws in Texas. Muse was editor of The Christian American and worked for the Southern Committee to Uphold the Constitution (SCUC), which used both antisemitic and anti-Black rhetoric in their lobby work against the reelection of Franklin D. Roosevelt. The Christian American Association worked on the far right-wing in Texas labor politics. He also used segregationist views as an argument against unions, stating that "From now on, white women and white men will be forced into organizations with black African apes whom they will have to call 'brother' or lose their jobs."

He was born at Moran, Texas. Beginning in 1917, he worked at the Fort Worth Chamber of Commerce and participated in a wide range of conservative political organizations. He became an associate of business magnate John Henry Kirby, and supported his fight against the Adamson Act which gave an eight-hour workday to railroad workers. He was strongly opposed to the New Freedom business reform legislation of Woodrow Wilson, as well as the New Deal policies of Franklin D. Roosevelt. During and after World War II, Muse was instrumental in passing a number of anti-union laws in the American South, and wished to propose a Right-to-work amendment to the United States Constitution.
