= Ted Natt =

Theodore "Ted" McClelland Natt (March 28, 1941 – August 7, 1999) was a Pulitzer Prize–winning publisher. Natt was publisher of the Longview Daily News when Mount St. Helens erupted in May 1980. In 1981 the paper and its staff won the Pulitzer Prize for Local, General, or Spot Reporting.

== Fatal Crash ==
On August 7, 1999, Natt attended a memorial service for writer Willard R. Espy in Oysterville, Washington, and left by personal helicopter. He did not arrive as expected in Kelso, Washington. His disappearance was a mystery. Over a month later, a group of bow hunters discovered Natt's body strapped into his crashed helicopter about six miles east of Knappa, Oregon.

== Ted Natt First Amendment Award ==
The Ted Natt Award recognizes Associated Press member newspapers in Washington, Oregon, Idaho, Utah and Montana for distinguished reporting on First Amendment issues.

- 2005: Seattle Times, for stories examining the Internet company InfoSpace and for pursuing newsworthy sealed documents.
- 2009: Salt Lake Tribune, for creating an online clearinghouse of hard-to-obtain government records.
- 2010: Seattle Times, for exposing mistreatment of elderly residences in adult family homes.
- 2013: Tacoma News Tribune, for public records access and open government principles.
- 2014: Daily Herald, for revealing abuses of county government public records and technology policies.
- 2015: The Oregonian, for public records access and open government principles.
- 2016: Sean Robinson and Tacoma News Tribune, for ongoing scrutiny of Pierce County Prosecutor Mark Lindquist.
- 2018: The Oregonian/OregonLive, for public records access and open government principles.
