= Columbus, Kansas =

City in Cherokee County, Kansas

- City and County seat
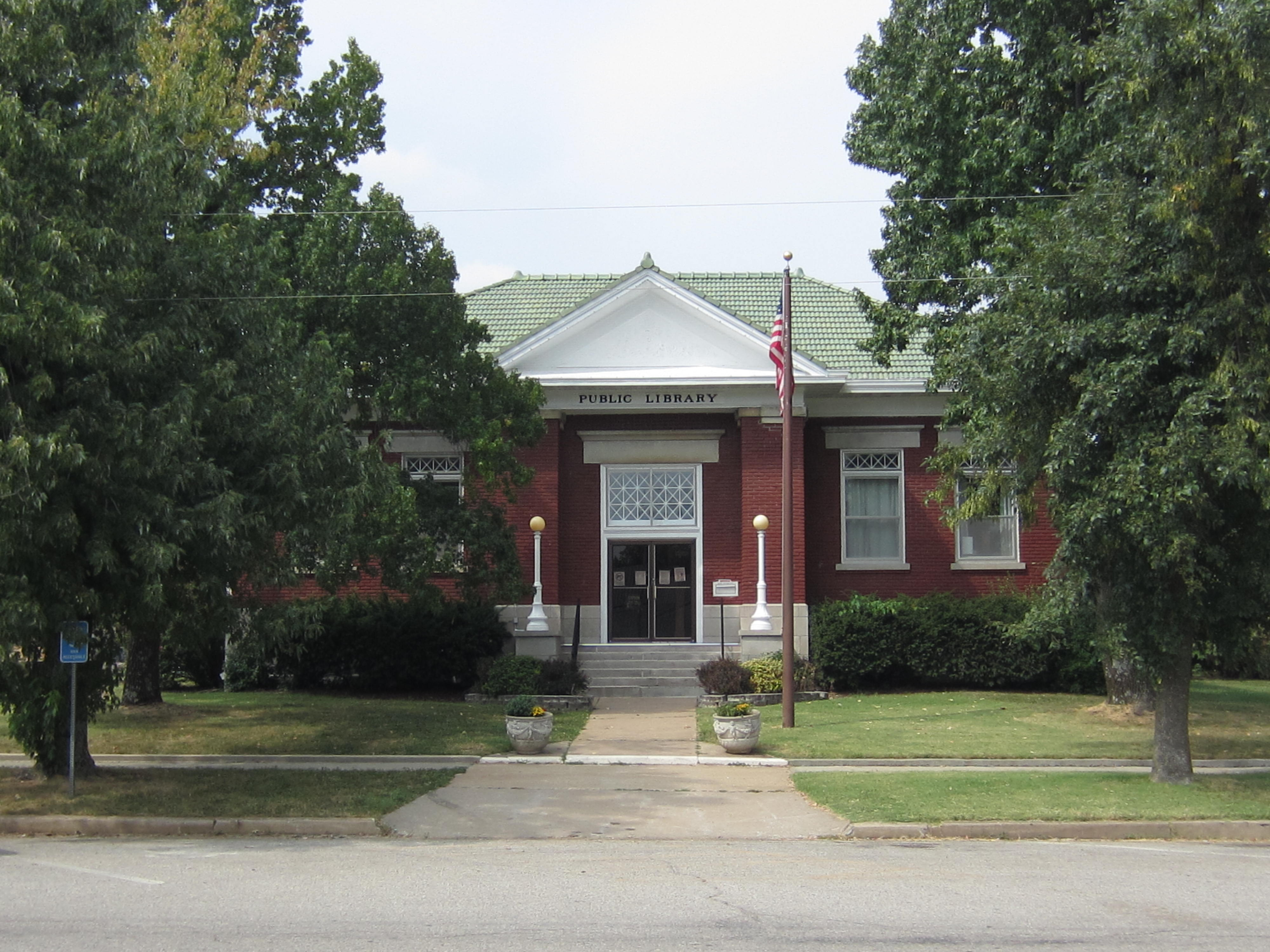
- Columbus Carnegie Library (2013)
- Motto: "Help America Discover Columbus..."
- Location within Cherokee County and Kansas

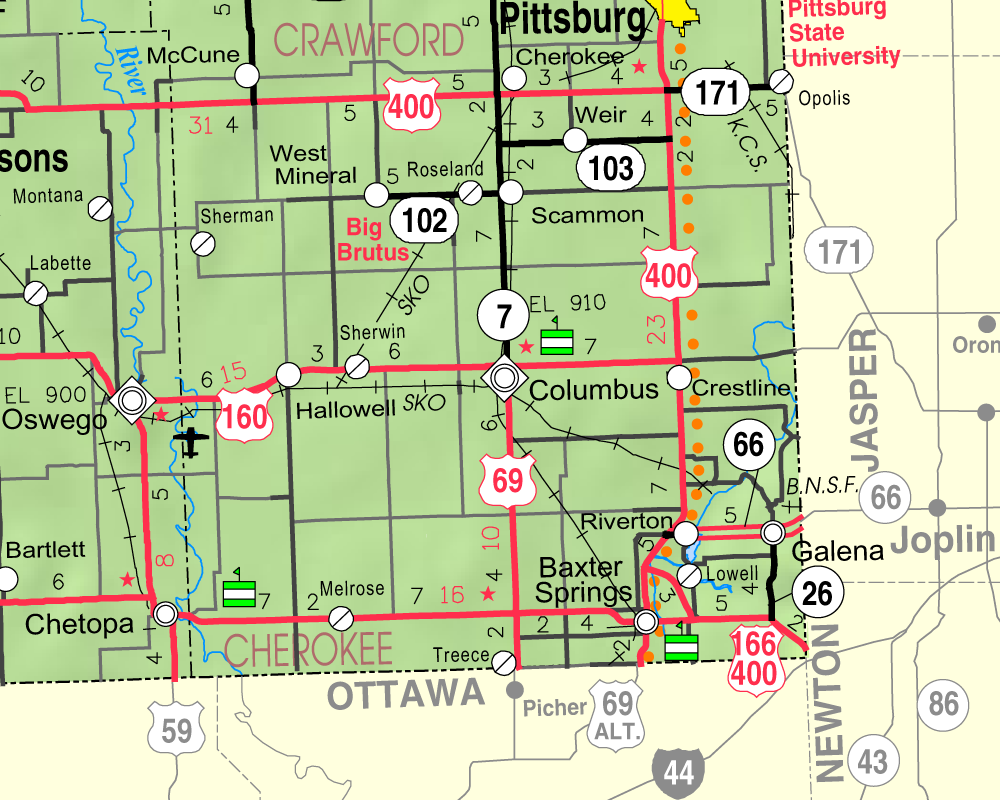
- KDOT map of Cherokee County (legend)
- Coordinates: 37°10′18″N 94°50′39″W
- Country: United States
- State: Kansas
- County: Cherokee
- Founded: 1868
- Incorporated: 1871
- Named for: Columbus, Ohio

Area
  - Total: 2.39 sq mi (6.20 km^{2})
  - Land: 2.39 sq mi (6.20 km^{2})
  - Water: 0 sq mi (0.00 km^{2})
- Elevation: 912 ft (278 m)

Population (2020)
  - Total: 2,929
  - Density: 1,220/sq mi (472/km^{2})
- Time zone: UTC-6 (CST)
  - Summer (DST): UTC-5 (CDT)
- ZIP Code: 66725
- Area code: 620
- FIPS code: 20-15075
- GNIS ID: 485558
- Website: columbusks.gov

Columbus is the second largest city in and the county seat of Cherokee County, Kansas, United States. As of the 2020 census, the population of the city was 2,929. It is located approximately 15 miles south-southwest of Pittsburg.

== History ==
The first settlement was made at Columbus in 1868. The first post office in Columbus was established in 1869.

Columbus was a railroad junction for the Saint Louis and San Francisco, and the Missouri, Kansas, and Texas railroads. It was named Columbus by A.L. Peters, one of the European-American founders, for his hometown of Columbus, Ohio; the name thus indirectly honors Christopher Columbus, the explorer. Coal, lead and zinc were mined in the region. Columbus had a considerable trade in agricultural products, and its businesses included machine shops, grain elevators, flour mills, a cigar factory, bottle works (soft drinks), a canning factory, and an extensive brick-making plant.

In 1875, Robert A. Long and Victor Bell formed the Long-Bell Lumber Company in Columbus. From one lumberyard, Long-Bell expanded operations and holdings to become one of the largest vertically integrated lumber companies in the United States. In 1956 it was purchased by International Paper.

== Geography ==
According to the United States Census Bureau, the city has a total area of 2.42 square miles (6.27 km^{2}), all land.

=== Climate ===
The climate in this area is characterized by hot, humid summers and generally mild to cool winters. According to the Köppen Climate Classification system, Columbus has a humid subtropical climate, abbreviated "Cfa" on climate maps.

Climate data for Columbus, Kansas (1991–2020 normals, extremes 1892–present)
Month	Jan	Feb	Mar	Apr	May	Jun	Jul	Aug	Sep	Oct	Nov	Dec	Year
Record high °F (°C)	77 (25)	85 (29)	93 (34)	97 (36)	98 (37)	108 (42)	117 (47)	115 (46)	108 (42)	98 (37)	85 (29)	78 (26)	117 (47)
Mean maximum °F (°C)	66.6 (19.2)	70.6 (21.4)	78.7 (25.9)	83.2 (28.4)	87.6 (30.9)	93.1 (33.9)	97.8 (36.6)	98.7 (37.1)	93.5 (34.2)	85.5 (29.7)	75.7 (24.3)	67.5 (19.7)	100.0 (37.8)
Mean daily maximum °F (°C)	43.6 (6.4)	48.8 (9.3)	58.1 (14.5)	67.6 (19.8)	75.8 (24.3)	85.0 (29.4)	89.6 (32.0)	89.3 (31.8)	81.4 (27.4)	70.3 (21.3)	57.5 (14.2)	46.8 (8.2)	67.8 (19.9)
Daily mean °F (°C)	33.4 (0.8)	38.1 (3.4)	47.1 (8.4)	56.6 (13.7)	65.7 (18.7)	74.9 (23.8)	79.5 (26.4)	78.5 (25.8)	70.3 (21.3)	58.9 (14.9)	46.9 (8.3)	37.1 (2.8)	57.2 (14.0)
Mean daily minimum °F (°C)	23.3 (−4.8)	27.4 (−2.6)	36.1 (2.3)	45.5 (7.5)	55.5 (13.1)	64.9 (18.3)	69.3 (20.7)	67.7 (19.8)	59.3 (15.2)	47.5 (8.6)	36.3 (2.4)	27.5 (−2.5)	46.7 (8.2)
Mean minimum °F (°C)	6.0 (−14.4)	11.4 (−11.4)	18.7 (−7.4)	30.6 (−0.8)	41.1 (5.1)	54.5 (12.5)	60.8 (16.0)	57.5 (14.2)	44.9 (7.2)	31.4 (−0.3)	21.0 (−6.1)	11.0 (−11.7)	1.6 (−16.9)
Record low °F (°C)	−19 (−28)	−28 (−33)	−17 (−27)	16 (−9)	28 (−2)	42 (6)	45 (7)	44 (7)	30 (−1)	15 (−9)	4 (−16)	−15 (−26)	−28 (−33)
Average precipitation inches (mm)	1.67 (42)	1.99 (51)	3.41 (87)	5.07 (129)	7.10 (180)	5.17 (131)	4.15 (105)	3.81 (97)	4.45 (113)	3.77 (96)	2.98 (76)	2.43 (62)	46.00 (1,168)
Average snowfall inches (cm)	2.3 (5.8)	1.1 (2.8)	1.3 (3.3)	0.0 (0.0)	0.0 (0.0)	0.0 (0.0)	0.0 (0.0)	0.0 (0.0)	0.0 (0.0)	0.0 (0.0)	0.2 (0.51)	2.3 (5.8)	7.2 (18)
Average precipitation days (≥ 0.01 in)	7.1	6.2	9.5	9.9	11.9	10.4	8.4	7.2	7.8	8.8	7.8	6.7	101.7
Average snowy days (≥ 0.1 in)	1.8	0.8	0.7	0.0	0.0	0.0	0.0	0.0	0.0	0.0	0.3	1.0	4.6
Source: NOAA

== Demographics ==
Historical population
Census	Pop.	Note	%±
1870	402		—
1880	1,164		189.6%
1890	2,160		85.6%
1900	2,310		6.9%
1910	3,064		32.6%
1920	3,155		3.0%
1930	3,235		2.5%
1940	3,402		5.2%
1950	3,490		2.6%
1960	3,395		−2.7%
1970	3,356		−1.1%
1980	3,426		2.1%
1990	3,268		−4.6%
2000	3,396		3.9%
2010	3,312		−2.5%
2020	2,929		−11.6%
U.S. Decennial Census

=== 2020 census ===
As of the 2020 census, Columbus had a population of 2,929, with 1,251 households and 746 families.

The median age was 39.8 years. 24.5% of residents were under the age of 18, 7.8% were from 18 to 24, 22.8% were from 25 to 44, 23.8% were from 45 to 64, and 21.1% were 65 years of age or older. For every 100 females, there were 87.6 males, and for every 100 females age 18 and over, there were 84.1 males age 18 and over.

The population density was 1,203.9 per square mile (464.8/km^{2}). There were 1,488 housing units at an average density of 611.6 per square mile (236.1/km^{2}), of which 15.9% were vacant. The homeowner vacancy rate was 4.2% and the rental vacancy rate was 10.4%.

Of households, 27.3% had children under the age of 18 living in them. Of all households, 40.1% were married-couple households, 18.1% were households with a male householder and no spouse or partner present, and 34.9% were households with a female householder and no spouse or partner present. About 35.1% of all households were made up of individuals, and 18.4% had someone living alone who was 65 years of age or older.

0.0% of residents lived in urban areas, while 100.0% lived in rural areas.

Racial composition as of the 2020 census
Race	Number	Percent
White	2,542	86.8%
Black or African American	14	0.5%
American Indian and Alaska Native	91	3.1%
Asian	6	0.2%
Native Hawaiian and Other Pacific Islander	0	0.0%
Some other race	22	0.8%
Two or more races	254	8.7%
Hispanic or Latino (of any race)	100	3.4%

=== Demographic estimates ===
The average household size was 2.2 and the average family size was 2.8. The percent of residents with a bachelor's degree or higher was estimated to be 15.2% of the population.

=== Income and poverty ===
The 2016–2020 5-year American Community Survey estimates show that the median household income was $36,688 (with a margin of error of +/- $7,704) and the median family income was $50,726 (+/- $10,311). Males had a median income of $25,964 (+/- $11,039) versus $30,048 (+/- $11,578) for females. The median income for those above 16 years old was $26,806 (+/- $8,270). Approximately, 9.7% of families and 21.7% of the population were below the poverty line, including 14.8% of those under the age of 18 and 22.4% of those ages 65 or over.

=== 2010 census ===
As of the census of 2010, there were 3,312 people, 1,424 households, and 850 families living in the city. The population density was 1,368.6 inhabitants per square mile (528.4/km^{2}). There were 1,633 housing units at an average density of 674.8 per square mile (260.5/km^{2}). The racial makeup of the city was 92.9% White, 0.5% African American, 2.7% Native American, 0.3% Asian, 0.4% from other races, and 3.3% from two or more races. Hispanic or Latino of any race were 2.1% of the population.

There were 1,424 households, of which 30.3% had children under the age of 18 living with them, 42.1% were married couples living together, 13.6% had a female householder with no husband present, 4.1% had a male householder with no wife present, and 40.3% were non-families. 34.9% of all households were made up of individuals, and 19.3% had someone living alone who was 65 years of age or older. The average household size was 2.29 and the average family size was 2.94.

The median age in the city was 39.1 years. 25% of residents were under the age of 18; 8.9% were between the ages of 18 and 24; 22.6% were from 25 to 44; 23.8% were from 45 to 64; and 19.7% were 65 years of age or older. The gender makeup of the city was 46.4% male and 53.6% female.

== Education ==
The community is served by Columbus USD 493 public school district.

== Notable people ==
- Marcellus Boss, fifth Civilian Governor of Guam
- Elizabeth W. Crandall, educator
- Merle Evans, bandleader for Ringling Brothers, Barnum & Bailey Circus
- James Reed Hallowell, politician
- Robert A. Long, lumber baron, developer, investor, newspaper owner, and philanthropist
- Doro Merande, film, stage and television actress
- Kenneth A. Spencer, industrialist
- Norma Terris, singer and actress
- Leland Justin Webb, first Mayor of Columbus, lawyer, served in the Civil War
- Thomas Daniel Winter, U.S. Representative from Kansas, 1939–1947
