= Museum of Kansas City =

- R. A. Long House
- U.S. National Register of Historic Places
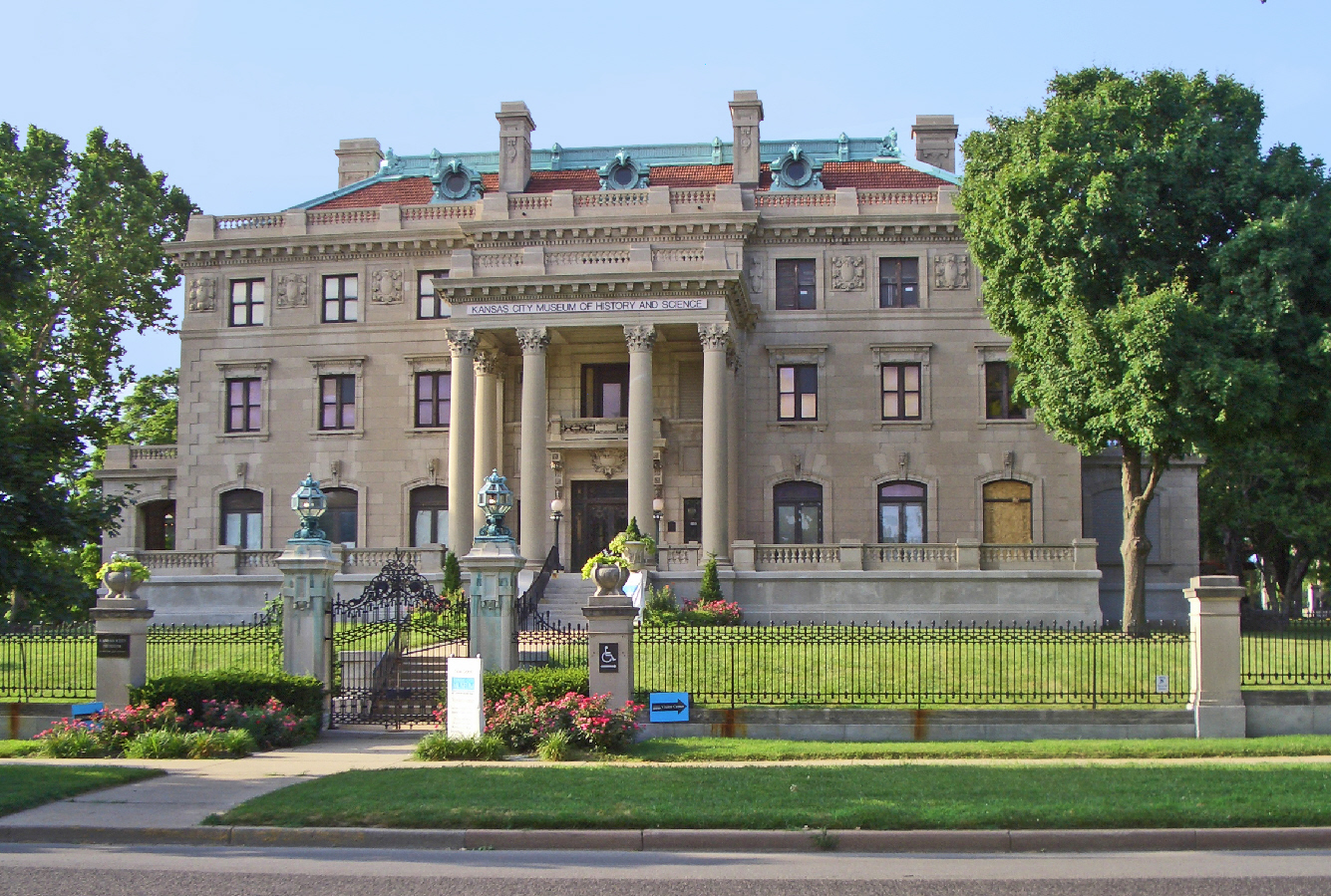
- Museum of Kansas City at Corinthian Hall

- Location within Missouri Location within the United States
- Location: 3218 Gladstone Blvd., Kansas City, Missouri
- Coordinates: 39.1158°N 94.54241°W
- Area: 3-acre (12,000 m^{2})
- Built: 1910; 116 years ago
- Architect: Henry F. Hoit
- Architectural style: Beaux Arts
- Website: museumofkansascity.org
- NRHP reference No.: 80002366
- Added to NRHP: November 14, 1980

The Museum of Kansas City is located in Kansas City, Missouri, United States. In 1910, the site was built by lumber baron and civic leader Robert A. Long as his private family estate, with the four-story historic Beaux-Arts style mansion named Corinthian Hall. In 1940, the site was donated by Long's heirs to become a public museum. Seventy-five years later, it began extensive renovation.

== Architecture ==
The 3-acre (12,000 m^{2}) estate consists of Corinthian Hall, named for its Corinthian columns, and its outbuildings. It was built as a private residence for Robert A. Long and his family, completed in 1910 for an estimated $1 million (equivalent to $34.6 million in 2025). It was designed by local architect Henry F. Hoit. The four-story mansion features 35,000-square-foot (3,300 m^{2}), with 24,292-square-foot (2,256.8 m^{2}) of livable space.

== History ==
R.A. Long began buying land on Gladstone Blvd to build the future home of himself, his wife Ella, and one of their daughters, the equestrian Loula Long Combs. The location of Corinthian Hall was chosen because it overlooked North Terrace Park (later renamed Kessler Park), giving ample room for Loula to exercise her horses.

Long wanted an entire block for his estate, however two houses already sat on the desired land. He bought both of the homes with the condition that they would be moved. One of the houses was a "high-turreted, three-story red brick mansion" that was the residence of Judge William Hockaday Wallace and his family. This house was moved to 3200 Norledge. The other home was the residence of Herman F. Schmelzer, but after Long bought it and had it moved, he gave the house to Dr. George Hamilton Combs. Combs was not only the pastor of the Independence Boulevard Christian Church where the Longs attended, but also the father of Loula's future husband, Robert Pryor Combs.

After the houses were moved, Long had the entire block to build his final home, Corinthian Hall, alongside several other buildings and structures. The other buildings were the gatehouse or "lodge", belonging to horse trainer David Smith and his family, the carriage house where horses and tack were kept, the conservatory, a gardener's shed, and a greenhouse. A pergola covered in wisteria hung over a walkway which connected the carriage house, conservatory, and greenhouse. As of September 2025, all buildings and structures are still present, except for the greenhouse, which was destroyed in the 1960s.

In 1917, Loula married Robert Pryor Combs, and the couple moved to Longview Farm. While the Longs' other daughter, Sally America Long Ellis, did not live at Corinthian Hall, she would visit often with her children. She gave birth to four out of her five children at the home.

This was the family residence until R.A. Long's death in 1934. Daughters Sally and Loula removed decorative items and architectural features from Corinthian Hall for installation in their own homes, including a fireplace from the library, taken to Loula's home at Longview Farm. The remainder of the items were auctioned off over a two-day period in the Fall of 1934. Afterwards, the mansion sat empty and was for sale. Olive Hoggins, the caretaker of the estate, alongside others, suggested to Long's daughters that the mansion become a museum. The daughters donated the estate to the Kansas City Museum Association in 1939. The association gained ownership of the Dyer Collection of Native American objects, and absorbed collections from the Missouri Valley Historical Society.

The museum's first director was John Ripley Forbes, a naturalist and conservationist from Massachusetts. After learning about the plans to turn Corinthian Hall into a museum, he borrowed $100, and drove down to Kansas City. He told the city leaders, "I've come to work...I'll raise the money, set up a first-class museum, open a children's program and go without pay until you can afford me." During Forbes' time, he amassed 160,000 items for the museum's collection. With the help of volunteers and labor from the Works Progress Administration (WPA), the mansion was transformed into exhibits, and the conservatory became a space where school groups could interact with live animals. On May 5, 1940, the museum opened to the public.

Funding for the museum was raised by two women's auxiliary groups, the Women's Division (who also created a garment collection), and the Musettes. While the two groups had a similar purpose, the Women's Division was for older, married women, and the Musettes was for younger, single women.

In 1942, Forbes was drafted into WWII, along with many workers from the WPA. Losing its director, many workers, and privy to war era scarcity, the museum closed its doors for the duration of the war. Upon reopening and facing financial difficulties, the museum was deeded to the City of Kansas City, Missouri, in 1948.

The 1950s brought about major changes for the museum. The museum focused its content on natural history and science, not much unlike its previous focus of "history, science, anthropology, and natural history exhibits and experiences." A new board trustee, Arthur Popham Jr., put emphasis on taxidermy displays, believing that "mounted specimens procured in the wild would contribute to an understanding of natural systems and encourage conservation of species and habitats". Taxidermy displays expanded to the lower level, along with displays featuring fossils, rocks, and minerals.

Money raised by the Women's Division led to the restoration of the original elevator. Part of the lower level was converted into a kitchen and lunchroom to feed school children coming to the museum for field trips. Through a partnership with Sally and Loula, the conservatory became a planetarium, fittingly named the R.A. Long Planetarium. The carriage house was renovated into a natural history hall, with the project headed by Harold Yokum (who by 1953 was the Curator of Natural History), and Wilber Phillips (who had previously worked at the museum as part of the WPA, and returned as the staff artist). Its first floor was dedicated to natural history displays, an auditorium/lecture hall, while the second floor was for staff who handled exhibits. A staff taxidermist was hired, who not only prepared taxidermy, but taught classes on the subject.

In 1954, the much loved "Eskimo Land" exhibit opened. It is remembered for its life-sized igloo and two taxidermied polar bears. This exhibit was in what is currently the museum's theater, on the 3rd floor.

Around 1960, the museum's name changed from "Kansas City Museum" to "Kansas City Museum of History and Science". Other changes came as well, such as a new facade on the natural history hall alongside a new name, "Arthur Popham Natural History Halls", named after Arthur Popham Jr.. The 1960s brought an era of prosperity for the museum, with expanding programming, school tours, and new auxiliary groups. The Kansas City Museum Natural Science Society was created, with its purpose being to sponsor big-game hunting expeditions in order to gather more specimens. However, due to shifting societal attitudes towards big-game hunting, the organization lost support from donors and disbanded.

Due to the growing size of the museum, it was decided that the focuses of natural history and science should be split, with all science exhibits and programming slated for a new building. In the late 1960s, plans were drafted for a new underground science museum and planetarium near Liberty Memorial. The plans ended up being scrapped, and another location, Union Station, was also considered as a site. Throughout the 1970s and 1980s, three campaigns for tax increases to fund Union Station becoming a science museum were attempted, but ultimately not approved by voters.

In the 1970s new exhibits focusing on Kansas City history were produced, with plans for the exhibits to extend to the third floor. However, due to changes in fire code, the third floor was closed off to the public sometime in the 1980s.

The 1910 Drug Store and Soda Fountain opened in the early 80s. Furniture for the space was donated by the Kirby family of Modena, MO. Wanting to keep to an authentic theme, the soda fountain had a small menu, reflecting what would've been served in 1910. Phosphates were a favorite of patrons. By the 1990s, the soda fountain had paid staff (it was run by volunteers initially), and new menu items such as Edy's ice cream and cookies.

David Ucko was hired as the new president of the museum, and tasked with reevaluating programming, as well as finding a new location for a science museum. Focus for such a project returned to the derelict Union Station. After the City of Kansas City fought a legal battle with a Canadian conglomerate to regain ownership of Union Station, major funding was sought to restore and renovate the building. This culminated in the Bi-State Culture District Compact in 1996, a historic first time effort of its kind to levy a tax between the states of Missouri and Kansas. Funding from the tax restored and renovated Union Station, while private funds created Science City.

The opening of Science City signaled the end of science exhibits and programming at the Kansas City Museum, with its sole purpose becoming history focused content.

In 2001, the museum's board voted to merge with Union Station Assistance Corporation and became Union Station Kansas City. The Kansas City Museum Association dissolved.

Due to the financial struggles that Union Station and Science City were facing, Mayor Kay Barnes formed two groups in 2006 to study the management and finances of both institutions. Once the reports were done, the Union Station group disbanded, while the Kansas City Museum group remained. It was decided that a dedicated group focused solely on managing the museum, and not both institutions, was necessary. This group became the Kansas City Museum Advisory Board, and while they worked with Union Station in an advisory position, the museum was their priority.

2006 also brought the arrival of a new director for the museum, Christopher Leitch. Under his leadership with support from the Kansas City Museum Advisory Board, a multitude of renovations and restorations were done. This included restoring the exterior masonry, roof, windows, all art glass, doors (as well as installing new ones). A HVAC system was installed in Corinthian Hall. In terms of museum content and programming, strategic and interpretative plans were developed, as well as plans for exhibits, programs, publications, community outreach efforts, and initiatives for collection management.

During this time, a temporary visitor center was established, and the planetarium was open. 1,627 objects on display were removed and taken to storage. Many of the objects were in poor condition due to changes of climate, such as the levels of humidity, within the museum. Exhibits that had been on display for "20 or 30 years" did not return, such as the taxdermied animals in the natural history displays in the former Natural History Halls. The intention for the animals was to permanently lend them to other museums.

In 2014, the City of Kansas City, Missouri, Parks and Recreation Department took over the operations and management of the museum. Anna Marie Tutera was hired on as the new director. Under her lead, more renovation and restoration projects were drafted for Corinthian Hall and other buildings on the property. The museum remained open for hard-hat tours from 2015 to 2017 as project plans developed. International Architects Atelier was brought on for the architectural design, while the museum design firm Gallagher & Associates was brought on for "architectural design, exhibit and digital media... [and] visitor experience planning and institutional planning, including a business plan and economic impact study."

In 2015, the museum acquired the Historic Garment District Museum, including the Ann Brownfield & Harvey Fried Historic Garment District Collection. The collection includes "more than 350 garments made by local companies from the 1920s through 1970s, accessories, archives, and sewing equipment". The museum operated out of 800 Broadway, Kansas City, MO, 64105, and expanded across the street at 801 Broadway in 2017. 2024 brought about the closing of the museum, with plans for the collection to be displayed at Corinthian Hall.

The Kansas City Museum closed in 2017, with JE Dunn beginning construction on Corinthian Hall later that year. Construction was completed in 2019.

Tutera emphasized that the goal of the renovations and restorations on Corinthian Hall was to "...integrate the modernization of the building and the contemporary aesthetic into the historic property...so that we didn’t compromise the historic integrity of the building.”

New features such as a 48-seat theater, a modernized soda fountain, and a boutique were added as amenities to the museum.

In 2021, the reformed Kansas City Museum Foundation took over "the governance, management and operations" of the museum from the parks department. The museum reopened to the public on October 21, 2021.

On May 5, 2025, the Kansas City Museum was renamed the Museum of Kansas City.

Several projects are in the works at the museum. The Carriage House will hold exhibits about "Loula Long Combs, Tom Bass, the American Royal, the Kansas City Stockyards, and the often-untold stories of Kansas City’s equestrian, agricultural, and transportation history", and will receive several architectural upgrades. The former conservatory/planetarium will turn into the JewelHouse, a collaborative project between the museum, International Architects Atelier, and New-York based artist Summer Wheat. The space intends to "center[] and celebrate[] the stories and contributions of women". A "skyspace" by James Turrell will be erected on the property. Renovations for the gatehouse, the shed, and the perimeter fencing and gates are also in development.
