= Long-Bell Lumber Company =

In 1875, Robert A. Long and Victor Bell formed the Long-Bell Lumber Company in Columbus, Kansas. The Long-Bell Lumber Company branched out using balanced vertical integration to control all aspects of lumber from the sawmills to the retail lumber yard. As the company expanded it moved further south and eventually had holdings in Arkansas, Oklahoma Indian Territory, East Texas and Louisiana, before heading west to Washington.

The company grew into one of the largest conglomerates of wood products of the era, with holdings in many states and under many subsidiary names, and sold out to International Paper in 1956.

== History ==
Three young men went into the business of selling hay in Columbus, Kansas. A major expense was the lumber to build a wagon to deliver the hay and sheds to store it. They found out that hay was a poor business but that lumber was in high demand. They tore down the sheds and sold the lumber. Robert Alexander Long, Victor Bell, whose father was president of Kansas City Savings Bank, and Robert White, cousin of Long, whose father was the cashier, started R. A. Long & Company. Within a short time, a competitor sold out to them and they opened more stores. In 1887 Robert White died and the remaining partners bought his share, incorporated the Long-Bell Lumber Company, and moved the headquarters to Kansas City.

=== Subsidiaries ===
There were company names such as Long-Bell Farm Land Corporation, Long-Bell Demonstration Farm Company, and Longview Development Company for property in Longview, Washington. R. A. Long Properties was Long’s personal holding company, Texas Naval Stores Company ran a turpentine distillery, and Hudson River Lumber Company had operations in DeRidder, Louisiana. The King-Ryder Lumber Company in Bon Ami, Louisiana, was the first Long-Bell venture in Louisiana; it also owned mills at Thomasville in Indian Territory, Winthrop, Arkansas, and Hudson, Arkansas just south of Ashdown, Arkansas.

The company operated The Long Bell Cabinet Division located at Longview, Washington, in the former drying sheds of the lumber mill they operated there for decades. The division manufactured kitchen and bath cabinets marketed in Sears and Montgomery Ward catalog and retail stores as well as through the company's lumber distribution yards. The division occupied approximately 23 acres under roof and the supervisors used bicycles to go between departments. The division was sold in approximately 1981 and eventually the plant was closed. Old-growth timbers from the structural framework of the plant have been recycled into many upscale homes, and a book of photographs has been published by an architect/builder who took a fondness to preserving a bit of history.

=== Railways ===
To collect and transport lumber, the company ran a number of railroads. It constructed the Longview, Portland and Northern Railway to serve its company town of Longview, Washington. For its efforts in Thomasville, the company constructed the 12-mile-long Kingston and Choctaw Valley Railroad in the 1898-1899 timeframe, which ran from south of Thomasville through the town to Howe, Oklahoma. Other railroads included the Alexandria, Woodworth & Beaumont Ry, the Shreveport, Alden Bridge & Camden Ry, and later the Louisiana & Pacific Railway-- all headquartered in Kansas City.

=== Sawmills in Louisiana ===
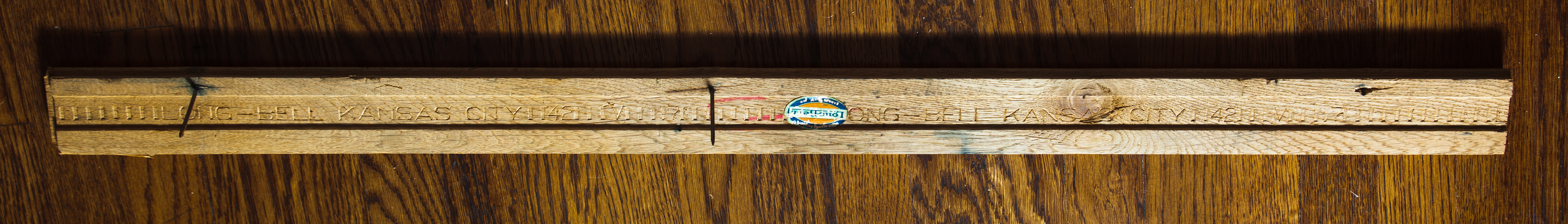
Back of a piece of hardwood flooring from a Long-Bell sawmill in Louisiana

Some of the sawmills in Louisiana and their year of startup were: Bon Ami, (King-Ryder Lumber Company) in 1901, DeRidder (Hudson River Lumber Company) in 1903, Merryville in 1904, Carson in 1904/05, Longville (reportedly the largest in Louisiana) in 1906/07, Ragley in 1907, Ludington in 1911, plus smaller mills.

The Calcasieu Lumber Company began operating in 1884 and became the Bradley-Ramsey Lumber Company in 1886. On March 16, 1906, Long-Bell Lumber Company purchased the Bradley-Ramsey Lumber Company, that included two sawmills, 105,000 acres of timberlands, the Lake Charles and Leesville Railroad, and the Lake Charles Chemical Company. This was the largest transaction of sawmill property in Southwest Louisiana prior to 1906, and increased the Long-Bell's daily production of lumber, at all five plants, to about 800,000 feet daily.

=== Kansas City, Missouri ===
In 1907 Long-Bell built the first "skyscraper" in Kansas City, named the R.A. Long Building, for the company corporate headquarters. At 16 stories tall, costing a reported 14 million dollars. The building was bought in 1940 by City National Bank & Trust Company.

== The Longs ==
R. A. Long and architect Henry Hoit built a mansion called Corinthian Hall a home to display the success of Mr. Long. After Corinthian Hall was completed, Long and Hoit began planning for Long's country home. Construction began and L took 18 months to complete. Belgian craftsmen and Sicilian stonemasons, among 2,000 other workers, were employed to build the Longview Mansion and 50 other farm structures on 1,780 acres (7.2 km^{2}). Some of this land was eventually donated to the Longview College and some was sold and became Longview Lake.

R. A. Long was active in charities. He built a school and other buildings in Longview, Washington from personal funds, was a founding member and President of the organization to have the Liberty memorial located in Kansas City, and others.

== 1915 Long-Bell companies ==
Listed in the Southern Pine Association.

- Arkansas Short Leaf Lumber Company in Pine Bluff, Arkansas
- Calcasieu Long Leaf Lumber Company in Lake Charles, Louisiana
- Fidelity Lumber Company in Doucette, Texas
- Hudson River Lumber Company in DeRidder, Louisiana
- King Ryder Lumber Company in Bon Ami, Louisiana (near DeRidder), transferred from Thomasville (now Stapp), Oklahoma
- Ludington Lumber Company in Ludington, Louisiana (now part of DeRidder)
- Lufkin Land and Lumber Company in Lufkin, Texas
- Rapides Lumber Company Ltd. in Woodworth, Louisiana
- Longville Lumber Company in Longville, Louisiana
- Long-Bell Lumber Company in Weed, California

== See also ==
- Ryderwood, Washington, founded by Long-Bell Lumber Company as a company town

== Related articles to R.A. Long ==
- Longview Lake
- R. A. Long High School
- Longview, Washington

== External sources ==
- https://web.archive.org/web/20130118031801/http://www.longviewfoundation.org/ralong.htm
- Grabow Incident Bibliography
- "Leather Britches" Smith and the Grabow Riot
- -1912 -Deridder houses from the sawmill days.
- Union Workers in jail - Picture!
