= Stapp, Oklahoma =

Unincorporated community in Oklahoma, US

Coordinates: 34°45′18″N 94°37′26″W

Stapp is an unincorporated community in Le Flore County, Oklahoma, United States. It is located approximately eight miles south of Heavener on US Route 59.

== History ==
The community originally formed in 1897 in Indian Territory under the name of Thomasville, about the time the Long-Bell Lumber Company purchased property there. The company created a subsidiary, the King-Ryder Lumber Company, which built a lumber mill at Thomasville and even a railway, the Kingston and Choctaw Valley Railroad, which ran from Thomasville to connect to other rail lines at Howe, Oklahoma. King-Ryder left about 1901 for Bon Ami, Louisiana, but other timber operations continued in the area.

The settlement was later reborn as Stapp, and had a Buschow Lumber Company sawmill. Stapp had a post office beginning in 1918. However, the Buschow mill, a victim of its own "cut and move on" timber policies, closed in 1932, and the post office followed in 1944. While at its height the population of the settlement was about 1,000, nothing remains of the old town today.
