= Louisiana and Pacific Railway =

Overview
- Locale: southern United States

Technical
- Track gauge: 4 ft 8 1/2 in (1,435 mm)
- Length: 30.904

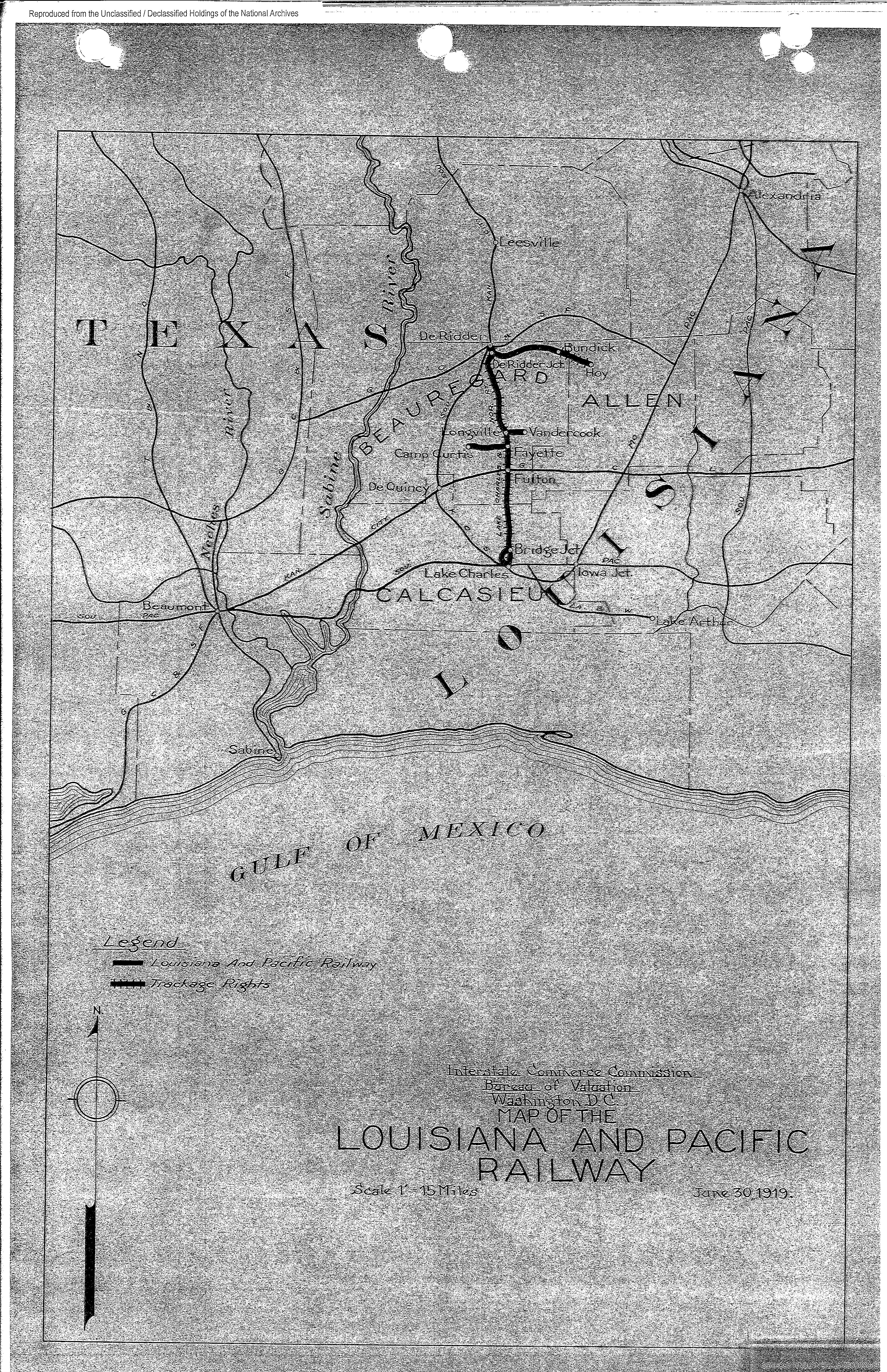
1919 map of the railroad

The Louisiana & Pacific Railway Company, controlled by the Long-Bell Lumber Company, had a total of 30.904 miles of tracks and trackage rights of 45 miles on the Lake Charles & Northern, between DeRidder and Bridge Junction (Lake Charles), and 6.3 miles from Bundicks (Longacre) to Hoy

The railway connected with the Gulf, Colorado and Santa Fe Railway Company at DeRidder, the Kansas City Southern Railway Company at Bon Ami, DeRidder, and Lake Charles, the Lake Charles & Northern Railroad Company at DeRidder (Junction), Fayette, Lake Charles, and Longville, the Louisiana Western Railroad Company at Lake Charles, the Missouri Pacific Railroad Company at Lake Charles, and the New Orleans, Texas and Mexico Railway at Fulton which was 2 to 3 miles east of Ragley and one mile from Pearl.

The only surviving steam locomotive from the L&P is Virginia and Truckee Railroad 2-8-0 No.29.
