= Winston Overton =

American judge (1870–1934)

Associate Justice of the Louisiana Supreme Court
- In office 1921–1934
- Succeeded by: John B. Fournet

Personal details
- Born: October 4, 1874 Marksville, Louisiana, U.S.
- Died: September 9, 1934 (aged 63)

Winston Overton (October 4, 1870 – September 9, 1934) was a justice of the Louisiana Supreme Court from July 5, 1921, to September 9, 1934.

Born in Marksville, Louisiana, Overton was the City Attorney for Lake Charles, Louisiana from 1899 to 1907, becoming a judge of the state's Fifteenth Judicial District in 1908. In this position, he presided over the grand jury and trial of union workers who were involved in the Grabow riot, which had led to four deaths. He pressed for charges to only be brought against members of the union.

He was a delegate to the Louisiana Constitutional Convention of 1921, for which he chaired the Judiciary Committee.

He was the brother of Senator John H. Overton.

Political offices
| Preceded by Newly reorganized court | Justice of the Louisiana Supreme Court; 1921–1934 | Succeeded by John B. Fournet |
