= Wilton Mountain =

Mountain in Oklahoma, United States

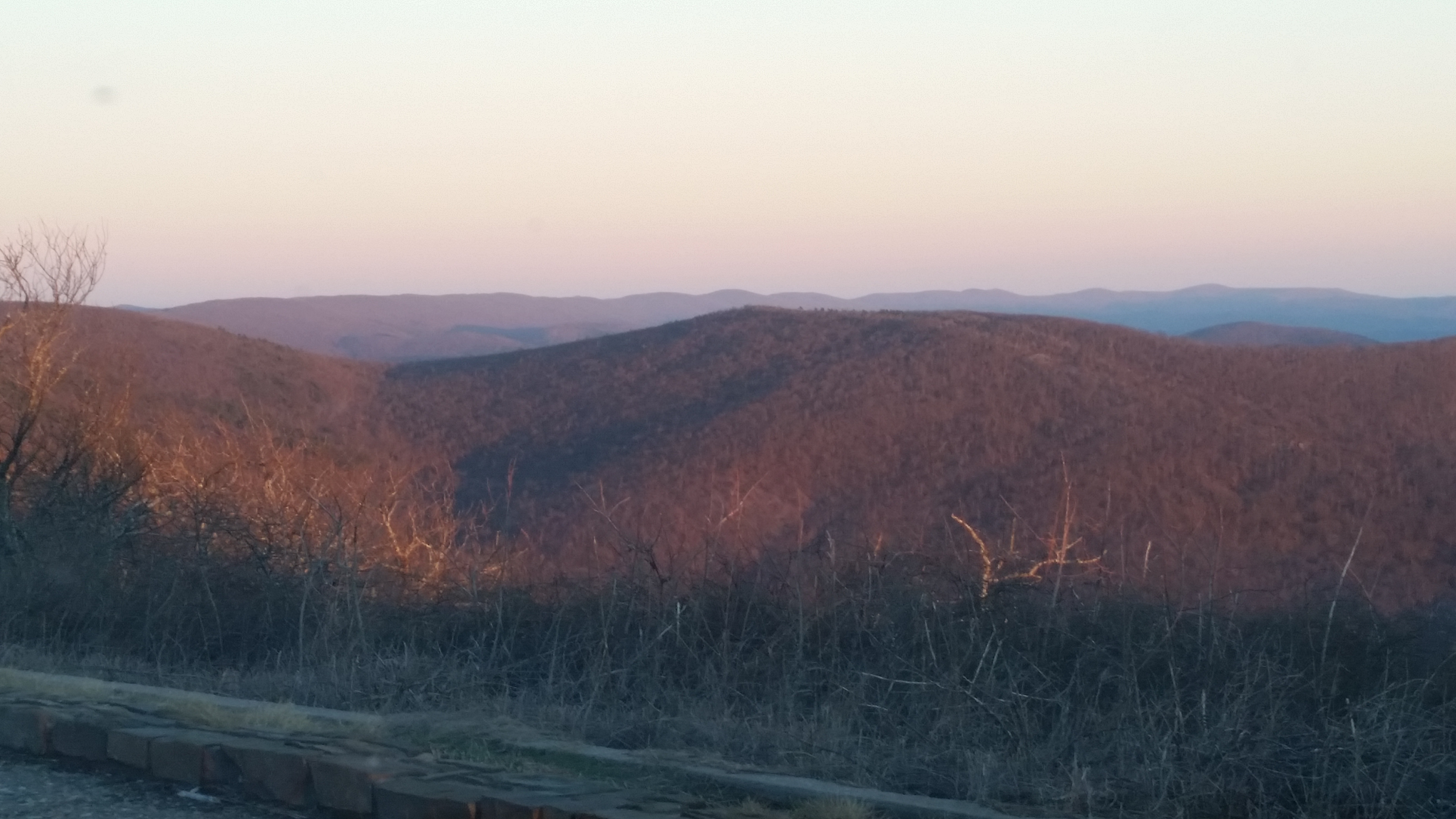
- Wilton Mountain, Le Flore county, Oklahoma.

Highest point
- Elevation: 2,543 ft (775 m)
- Coordinates: 34°40′42″N 94°34′1″W

Geography
- Location within Oklahoma
- Location: Le Flore County, Oklahoma, United States
- Topo map(s): USGS Page, OK

Wilton Mountain, in Ouachita National Forest, is a summit in the Ouachita Mountains in Le Flore County, Oklahoma, approximately 2 miles (3 km) from U.S. Route 59 and approximately 6 miles (10 km) west of the Arkansas state line. Wilton Mountain is 2,543 feet (775.1 m) above mean sea level.
