= John Henry Kirby =

American businessman (1860–1940)

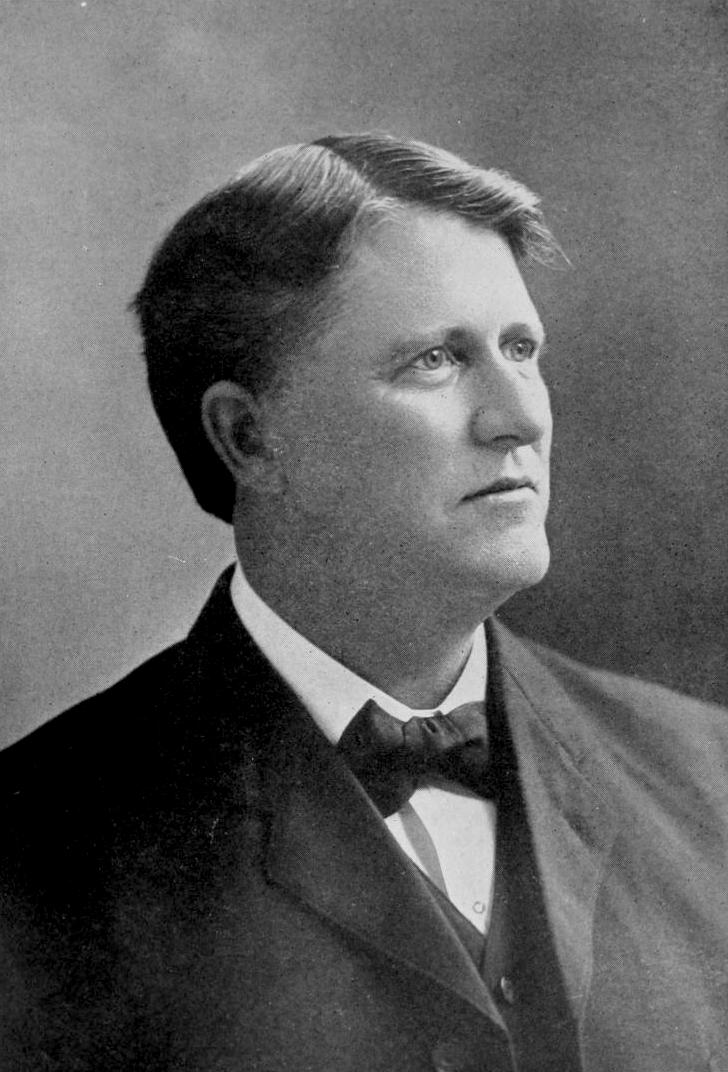
- Born: November 16, 1860; Tyler County, Texas, U.S.
- Died: November 9, 1940 (aged 79); Houston, Texas, U.S.
- Occupations: Entrepreneur; corporate president
- Years active: 1882–1940
- Known for: Founding Kirby Lumber Company and Houston Oil Company
- Parent(s): John Thomas and Sarah (Payne) Kirby

John Henry Kirby (November 16, 1860 – November 9, 1940) was an American businessman whose ventures made him the largest lumber manufacturer in Texas and the Southern United States. In addition to serving two terms in the Texas Legislature, he also established the Kirby Petroleum Company. With his successful reputation, he was known by his business peers as "The Prince of the Pines" and "The Father of Industrial Texas". He was also active in anti-union and subversive political activities, co-founding the Southern Committee to uphold the Constitution, which supported racism, fascism, and sought to block the reelection of Franklin D. Roosevelt. Kirbyville, Texas, in Jasper County is named after him, as is Kirby Drive and Upper Kirby in Houston.

== Early life and political ties ==
He was born to John Thomas and Sarah Kirby (née Payne) on November 16, 1860, in Tyler County, and brought up on the family's homestead which is now Camp Ta-Ku-La. First taught to read and write by his mother, his formal education later on was limited to rural schools and one semester at Southwestern University, Georgetown, where he studied law. With the influence of state senator Samuel Bronson Cooper, he served as a clerk in the Texas Senate from 1882 to 1884. During his clerkship he married Lelia Stewart of Woodville. He practiced law for four years before moving to Houston to join the law firm of Hobby and Lanier.

In 1887, with Cooper's influence, Kirby provided legal services to a group of investors from Boston, Massachusetts. With their financial backing, the east Texas timberland was harvested for lumber under the name Texas Pine Land Association. This business alone provided Kirby with a small fortune. In 1893 he partnered with a lawyer named Nathaniel D. Silsbee, an investor from Boston. These two, along with an investor named Ellington Pratt, established the Gulf, Beaumont and Kansas City Railroad from Beaumont to San Augustine. Upon the railroad's completion, Kirby sold it to the Atchison, Topeka and Santa Fe Railway which extended its line to the new lumber processing site at Silsbee, the town named after the investor. The sale of the railroad yielded a high profit for Kirby. It was at this location in 1900 that the Kirby Lumber Company was established. This business became the largest lumber producer in the south, with Kirby controlling 300,000 acres (1200 km²) of timberland. At its peak between 1910 and 1920, it had some 16,500 employees and included twelve operating mills and five logging camps.

== Business venture in oil ==
The following year, and after the discovery of oil at Spindletop, Kirby partnered with Patrick Calhoun of the Houston Oil Company of Texas. Kirby created an unusual business relationship between his lumber company and the oil entity: the Kirby Lumber Company gained timber rights onto extensive east Texas land, where as the Houston Oil Company gained land and maintained mineral rights. Several years later, legal problems arose because Kirby overestimated the value of the lumber, and the partners failed to clearly define ownership of certain land areas. The Kirby Lumber Company still continued to prosper despite court ordered receivership status for both companies. In 1902, Kirby took over the Higgins Oil and Fuel Company owned by Pattillo Higgins for 3 million dollars. In 1921, Kirby established the Kirby Petroleum Company, a Houston-based oil and gas exploration company.

In 1923, Kirby received an honorary law degree from Lincoln Memorial University. Due to the Great Depression, his lumber company suffered financial strain and fell into the hands of the Atchison, Topeka and Santa Fe Railway in 1933 due to bankruptcy. He remained president of the enterprise until his death on November 9, 1940.

== Later political and anti-union activities ==
Perceptions of Kirby's treatment of his employees were at times mixed. On one hand he was known to provide Christmas dinners, bibles, toys, other gifts, and funds for college educations for children and of mill towns. He was also one of the earliest in the region to reduce work hours from 10 to 8 in his mills. However, these actions have been criticized as being paternalistic. Additionally, unionization efforts were met with hostility. Following the organization of the Brotherhood of Timber Workers in 1910 Kirby stated that "In the view of the owners such efforts, if successful, will be absolutely destructive of the industry." The Southern Lumber Operators Association, spearheaded by Kirby who was sitting president of the organization, preemptively attempted to discredit the union in the public eye, decrying it as a socialist, anarchistic, and radical organization. Furthermore, he and other operators constructed yellow dog contracts, triggering several strikes and the closure of mills. On 27 July 1910, it was decided that Kirby would close 11 mills in the vicinity of DeRidder, Louisiana, locking out approximately 3,000 employees beginning 7 August. Kirby and 125 other operators agreed to close 300 mills across Texas, Arkansas, and Louisiana, and Mississippi. The American Lumber Company in Merryville, Louisiana, was one of the few member companies of the SLOA that did not comply with the lockout, instead agreeing to a contract with the union. Kirby met this with hostility, stating ALC's J.M. West "betrayed us..." and "we forced him out and closed the door in his face." One of the principal issues Kirby and the SLOA took with the BTW was its integration of Black, Mexican, and, Italian workers as well as white. Kirby attempted to stoke racial tension, writing to a Black school teacher "The promoters of that Brotherhood have no concern about our colored citizenship except insofar as they can use the negroes for their personal advantage."

Tensions continued to escalate between the workers and operators into 1912, especially after the BTW elected to affiliate with the Industrial Workers of the World. In July of the same year, violent clashes would occur between union and company men at Graybow, Louisiana, resulting in three union men being killed and one company guard following a firefight. Three union men were arrested, but later acquitted. The American Lumber Company was directed by SLOA and Kirby moved to lockout 1,000 workers in July. On 11 November the only formally declared strike of the BTW began, instigated by Kirby's actions. It was called off by the union in the summer of 1913, after the IWW shifted its focus away from East Texas and Western Louisiana to the Pacific Northwest. By 1916 the remnants of the BTW had dissolved, and Kirby celebrated his victory over what he called a "Ishmaelitic organization".

Also in 1916, he and fellow Texas business executive and lobbyist Vance Muse, raised money to fight the Adamson Act of 1916 which provided business reforms, and an 8 hour workday for rail workers. Kirby and Muse, would go on to found the Southern Committee to Uphold the Constitution in 1934, of which Kirby was Chairman. Among this organization's principal goals were to prevent the reelection of Franklin D. Roosevelt by harnessing the Southern white vote through stoking anti-Black racism and attacking CIO unions. The group also openly supported Fascism. They received substantial funding from several members of the Du Pont family, as well as Continental Can Company and Standard Oil. Among some of the publications the Committee produced was one in 1936, which included a picture of Elanor Roosevelt alongside Black men at the White House and text that read "President Roosevelt has … permitted Negroes to come to the White House banquet table and sleep in the White House beds." Many of its drives, personally spearheaded by Kirby himself, spread anti-Semitic narratives. Gerald L. K. Smith, active member of the fascist Silver Legion of America, collaborated with these drives.

== Philanthropy ==
Kirby provide the land and funds to build Kirby High School in Woodville, Texas, in 1928. The last class graduated in 1979.

In 1929, Kirby donated part of what is today the 626-acre (2.5 km²) John Henry Kirby State Forest, which is located in Tyler County in southeastern Texas.

== Biographies ==
- John Henry Kirby: Prince of the Pines, by Mary Lasswell Smith (1967)
