= Brotherhood of Timber Workers =

Former trade union of the United States

The Brotherhood of Timber Workers (BTW) (1910–1916) was a union of sawmill workers, farmers, and small business people primarily located in East Texas and West Louisiana, but also had locals in Arkansas (7) and Mississippi (1). The BTW was organized in 1910 by Arthur Lee (A.L) Emerson and Jay Smith as an industrial union. Estimates of membership fall between 20,000 and 35,000 people. Despite being located in the Jim Crow South the union was open to members of all races and women were granted membership in 1912. Roughly half of the membership is believed to have been African American. Members of Brotherhood had their work cut out for themselves, organizing an interracial union during Jim Crow in one of the largest industries in the South. Louisiana, Texas, and Mississippi were three of the largest timber producing states in the country during that era.

The BTW became known for its participation in the Grawbow Riot, or massacre, in 1912. Men who worked for Galloway Lumber Company opened fire on union meeting: three union workers were killed and one of the company men. The BTW had struck against the mill in Grabow, Louisiana. The Brotherhood of Timber Workers was known for having interracial membership at a time when racial segregation was increasing in many areas of the Deep South. It also included both males and females, but most of the mill jobs were held by men.

== History ==
The Panic of 1907 hit the United States. In response, owners and operators of sawmills in the southern pine region threatened to cut wages by 20% and increase working hours. The poor working and living conditions, on top of the unannounced pay cuts angered the sawmill workers, who organized a large strike in response. The managers pulled back their threat after the full-scale strike. Promises of increased pay and better conditions were made. Over the course of the next few years however, conditions and pay continued to be low. The work was dangerous, and routine actions required workers to have enough endurance to keep up with the machines. In 1919 alone there were 125 deaths reported in the industry, and 16,950 accidents with injuries.

The BTW was created in an effort by workers to improve these terrible working conditions in the sawmills. In 1910, lumberjacks A.L. Emerson and Jay Smith began to recruit members for the Brotherhood of Timber Workers. They moved from camp to camp to recruit hundreds of black, white, and Mexican workers; membership grew and word spread rapidly. By the time they felt strong enough to come public they held their first convention in Alexandria, Louisiana. It was here where they drafted their constitution that extended membership to all races and sexes. The creation of the BTW sparked the interest of the Southern Lumber Operators' Association (SLOA) whose purpose was to prevent unions from rising in the lumber camps and sawmills of the South.

The clash began in 1911 when SLOA encouraged their members to rid their plants of union labor by firing anyone associated with the union. These firings coincided with mass walkouts of union members in some plants resulting in the SLOA's decision to shut down 23 mills in East Texas and Louisiana, effectively locking out the workers in an attempt to defeat the BTW before it could gain momentum. This shutdown continued for months and BTW members were blacklisted. In order for workers to work again, the SLOA came up with a solution – they had to disown the union on paper called "yellow card" contracts or anti-union cards. Although this was one of the only ways for workers to gain their jobs back, many members refused.

The attempts by the SLOA to crush the rising union had failed and mills were reopened. The clash was not over, but mill workers had won a small battle; receiving a slightly higher wage.

== Uniting with the Industrial Workers of the World ==
At the BTW's second annual convention, held in Alexandria, Louisiana in 1912, Bill Haywood, also known as "Big Bill" Haywood, attended with leaders A.L. Emerson and Covington Hall. He noticed that two separate conventions were being held, one for blacks and one for whites. Haywood addressed this problem in an attempt to unite the union, calling for black and white to join in one convention hall. The BTW made a step toward equality for their colored members. The affiliation with the Industrial Workers of the World(IWW) was voted in favor by a vote of 71½ to 26½. A "Board of Colored Executive Officers" was established to work in conjunction with the White Executive Officers.

The Lumber Operators' Association criticized the BTW as an anarchistic, race-mixing organization, in an attempt to diminish support among white workers. After affiliation with the IWW, the BTW had presented the Lumber operators with a list of demands. In response, company managers locked out union workers and brought in scab labor. The mills also employed operatives to expose workers who were a part of the union. They hired armed guards in an attempt to keep organizers out. Many of these guards were deputized by the local sheriff, providing an impression of legal sanction. This set the stage for the incident in Grabow.

== Grabow Riot ==
On July 7, 1912, A.L. Emerson led a group of strikers toward the King-Ryder mill. Upon hearing the news that H.G. Creel was almost assassinated, they changed course toward the Galloway mill in Grabow, Louisiana. After arriving, Emerson began to talk to the crowd, when gunshots were fired from the company office. This sparked a gun battle between the company gunmen and the armed union participants. According to a news article in the Dawson Daily News, four men were killed and four other men were seriously wounded as a result of the battle. There were also 37 men who were wounded.

Following the incident, 49 union men and officials were arrested and faced charges of conspiracy and murder. After two months all 49 men, including A.L. Emerson, were acquitted at trial of all charges and were set free. This victory was a key point in the history of the BTW, but had drained most of the BTW's resources.

== Merryville and the decline of the union ==
In Merryville, Louisiana was an American sawmill that was owned and managed by Sam Park. What set Merryville apart from the rest of the mills operating during that time, was that the owner, Sam Park, "tolerated" the BTW. Most of his workforce was composed of union members. This made Merryville an important piece in the Brotherhood's financial plans. With other mills locking out workers and blacklisting union members, and the Grabow Trial draining the BTW's funds, Merryville became a source of income for the BTW.

Park was strongly disliked by the SLOA; they criticized him for "treachery" for his refusal to shut down his mills during lockouts, and for tolerating the BTW. Park became a target for SLOA in their attempts to crush the BTW. They were successful and Park was removed from Merryville.

The new management made clear their feelings towards the BTW by firing 15 employees that played a part in the Grabow Trial. This instigated a strike that the BTW knew they didn't have the funds to support following the Grabow Trial. Although funds were depleted, the BTW started a strike against the Merryville Mill with 1,200 men. This strike was partially successful in the beginning, but the BTW, in shutting down the mill, began to lose its strength; as the mill began to fully operate with nonunion workers. The end of the strike was signaled when a group of people called "The Good Citizens League" attacked the headquarters of the strike and forced the BTW out of Merryville.

The loss of the Merryville strike resulted in the eventual decline of the BTW. Their resources had been depleted and membership had fallen since Grabow. With resistance fading, the SLOA was successful in defeating the BTW, and had effectively crushed the union following the loss of the Merryville strike. While the BTW continued to exist until 1916, the union was "effectively destroyed".
