= Bon Ami, Louisiana =

Bon Ami
- Ghost Town
- Location within the state of Louisiana
- Coordinates: 30°48′28″N 93°17′43″W
- Country: United States
- State: Louisiana
- Parish: Beauregard
- Elevation: 187 ft (57 m)
- Time zone: UTC-6 (Central (CST))
  - Summer (DST): UTC-5 (CDT)
- GNIS feature ID: 553748

Bon Ami is a ghost town that was located in what is currently Beauregard Parish, approximately 2 miles south of Deridder, Louisiana, United States. The site of the town itself is located at coordinates 30°48'12.03"N 93°17'40.08"W, and is abandoned. United States Geological Survey maps from 1947 show the location of the town, where the Kansas City Southern and the Louisiana & Pacific railways are parallel.

The town was created by the King-Ryder Lumber Company (subsidiary of the Long-Bell Lumber Company) as a sawmill town during the lumber boom. Ground was broken for the town in 1900 with the mill beginning operation on July 26, 1901, when the area was still included in Calcasieu Parish. In 1904, it was the fourth largest town in Calcasieu parish, having at least 1,500 inhabitants, 210 houses, two schools, three secret orders, two churches, and two hotels. The mill cut out its timber in 1925, at which time the mill and much of the town were dismantled.

== See also ==
- Deridder - a town in neighboring Beauregard Parish.
- Long-Bell Lumber Company - owner of the King-Ryder Lumber Company.
- Louisiana-Texas Lumber War of 1911-1912
