= Timeline of Kansas City, Missouri =

Timeline of American city

Coordinates: 39.099722°N 94.578333°W

The following is a timeline of the history of Kansas City, Missouri, United States.

== 19th century ==
- 1821
  - François Chouteau set up a permanent trading post.
  - Missouri became the 24th state admitted to the Union.
- 1826 - Jackson County created.
- 1833 - John Calvin McCoy founded West Port.
- 1834 - Westport Landing established on the Missouri River.
- 1839 - Settlement named Town of Kansas after the local Kaw People.
- 1840 - City Market established.
- 1846 - Population: 700.
- 1849 - Cholera pandemic of 1849 killed half the settlers of the towns of Kansas and Westport.
- 1850
  - June 3: Town of Kansas formally organized municipality in Jackson County.
  - Kelly's Westport Inn built.
- 1853
  - March 28: City of Kansas incorporated by Missouri.
  - William S. Gregory elected as first mayor.
- 1854
  - First city council president, Johnston Lykins, became second mayor.
  - Kansas City Journal-Post newspaper founded by a group of city fathers and businessmen.
  - Bleeding Kansas - violent confrontations 1854-1859.
- 1855 - Harris-Kearney House was built in Westport.
- 1856 - Alexander Majors House built.
- 1857
  - Chamber of Commerce established.
  - Union Cemetery founded.
  - Historic Quality Hill neighborhood developed by Kersey Coates
  - Lykins Mansion built at 12th and Broadway. (The city's first mansion.)
- 1858
  - John Wornall House built.
  - Fr. Bernard Donnelly hires 300 Irish workers to carve streets out from the bluffs.
- 1859 - Central Overland California and Pikes Peak Express Company sends first stagecoach to Denver.
- 1860 - Population: 4,418.
- 1861 - The American Civil War begins.
- 1863
  - Union Women's Prison collapses August 13, killing four women and injuring several more. Pro-Confederate bushwhackers cite this as justification for the Sacking of Lawrence.
  - General Order No. 11 removes settlers south of Brush Creek.
- 1864 - October 23: Battle of Westport.
- 1865
  - Patrick Shannon becomes mayor.
  - The American Civil War ends.
  - Lincoln College Preparatory Academy founded.
- 1866 - St. Teresa's Academy established.
- 1867
  - March 1: First meeting of the Kansas City Public Schools Board of Education.
  - Central High School established.
  - The Kansas City Times was founded.
  - Kansas City Fire Department established.
- 1868 - George Muehlebach Brewing Company founded. (Acquired by Schlitz in 1956.)
- 1869 - July 3: Hannibal Bridge over the Missouri River opens, first railroad bridge across the river.
- 1870
  - Elijah M. McGee becomes mayor.
  - Coates Opera House built. (Burned down in 1901.)
  - Population: 32,260.
  - Tivoli Garden, a 6 acre beer garden at 24th & Main opens. (Closed 1879.)
- 1871
  - Kansas City Bar Library Assoc. formed.
  - The Kansas City Stockyards established.
- 1872 - Elmwood Cemetery established.
- 1873 - First St. Patrick's Day parade.
- 1874
  - Kansas City Police Department created.
  - St. Joseph Hospital opened.
- 1875
  - Old St. Patrick Oratory built.
  - Fetterman Circulating Library.
  - Gallup Map founded.
- 1879 - Lawrence F. Rieger Real Estate Broker (Now Kessinger Hunter) opens at 5th and Main.
- 1880
  - The Kansas City Star newspaper founded by William Rockhill Nelson and Samuel E. Morss.
  - City Hospital opened.
  - Population: 55,785.
- 1882
  - Kansas City Club founded.
  - KCP&L installs electric lights.
  - William Volker founded his home furnishings business.
  - Saint Luke's Hospital of Kansas City opened.
- 1883 - Cathedral of the Immaculate Conception built. Golden dome added in 1960.
- 1884
  - Boss James Pendergast begins his political career.
  - The Barstow School founded.
- 1885
  - Kansas City Art Institute founded, later attended by Walt Disney
  - First overhead electric trolleys in the US used here.
- 1886
  - Bon Ami Company (now Faultless Brands) founded.
  - Hyde Park subdivision begun.
  - German Hospital (Research Medical Center) opens.
  - First Hannibal Bridge severely damaged by a tornado.
- 1887
  - Kansas City Southern Railway founded.
  - J. Rieger & Co. distillery originally founded.
  - Freight House in the Crossroads was built.
  - Original Chouteau Bridge completed.
  - St. Mary's Episcopal Church building built. (Church formed 1857.)
- 1888
  - Forest Hill Cemetery founded.
  - The Savoy Hotel opened.
  - Original 8th Street cable car tunnel opened.
- 1889
  - Shook, Hardy & Bacon law firm founded.
  - The city of Kansas City formed by merger of Westport and City of Kansas.
  - Electric streetcars begin replacing cable cars.
  - Kansas City Public Library building opens.
  - Unity Church founded.
- 1890
  - Benjamin Holmes became mayor.
  - New York Life Insurance Building becomes the city's first skyscraper.
  - Population: 132,716.
- 1892
  - August Meyer appointed president of the city's first park board.
  - Kansas City's Parks and Boulevard system is designed by George Kessler.
  - First Court House built.
  - Pencoyd Railroad Bridge built.
- 1893
  - City Hall built.
  - Kansas City Athletic Club founded.
  - The Progress Club built in Quality Hill as a social club for prominent Jewish gentlemen.
- 1895 - Kansas City School of Law founded.
- 1896
  - Kansas City Country Club founded.
  - Swope Park created.
- 1897
  - City workhouse castle opened, old workhouse abandoned.
  - Westport and Hyde Park annexed.
  - Children's Mercy Hospital founded.
- 1898 - Burns & McDonnell founded.
- 1899
  - The American Royal began as a cattle show in the Kansas City Stockyards.
  - Dr. Generous Henderson House completed.
  - The Independent, Kansas City's society journal was founded.

== 20th century ==
=== 1900s-1940s ===
- 1900
  - 1900 Democratic National Convention held.
  - Federal Building constructed.
  - Folly Theater opened.
  - Population: 163,752.
- 1902
  - Sunshine Biscuits (formerly The Loose-Wiles Biscuit Company) founded.
  - First Orthodox synagogue built.
  - Imperial Brewing Company Brewery opened on Southwest Boulevard.
- 1903
  - Flood of 1903: Kansas River flooded the West Bottoms.
  - Automobile Club of Kansas City active.
- 1904
  - Penn Valley Park created.
  - Improved 8th Street streetcar tunnel opened. (Closed 1956.)
  - Mineral Hall residence completed in Hyde Park.
- 1906 - J.C. Nichols begins developing Country Club District neighborhoods.
- 1907
  - Lewis and Clark Viaduct built above the West Bottoms and over the Kaw River.
  - Waddell & Harrington bridge engineering company founded.
  - Electric Park opened at 46th and Paseo.
  - R.A. Long Building completed at 10th and Grand.
  - Westport High School established.
- 1908
  - General Hospital built.
  - Henry Perry "Father of Kansas City barbecue" began business.
- 1909
  - Kansas City Zoo opens in Swope Park
  - Waldo neighborhood annexed.
- 1910
  - Hall Brothers (Hallmark Cards) founded.
  - Corinthian Hall was built by lumber baron Robert A. Long.
  - Rockhurst University founded by Fr. Michael Dowling, S.J.
  - Population: 248,381.
- 1911
  - Kansas City Star Building built.
  - Stuart Hall Building built.
  - ASB Bridge completed.
  - Union Pacific Intermodal Bridge over the Kaw River completed.
  - George Washington statue installed at Washington Square.
- 1912 - Grand Avenue Temple United Methodist Church built. (Church formed 1865.)
- 1913
  - City Center Bank founded (UMB Financial Corporation).
  - Cook Paint and Varnish Company founded.
- 1914
  - Western Auto Building built.
  - Federal Reserve Bank of Kansas City and Paseo YMCA open.
  - Union Station opens, replacing the Union Depot.
  - Mack B. Nelson mansion built at 55th and Ward Parkway.
  - Katz Drug Store founded.
- 1915
  - HNTB Corporation founded.
  - Helzberg Diamonds founded.
  - Black & Veatch founded.
  - Kansas City Polytechnic Institute established.
  - The Hotel Muehlebach opened.
- 1916 - Argentine Carnegie Library built.
- 1917
  - Rockhurst College opens.
  - Second Hannibal Bridge opens.
- 1918 - William Thornton Kemper Sr. acquires City Center Bank.
- 1919
  - Prohibition of alcohol begins. (1919-1933)
  - Truman and Jacobson's haberdashery opens downtown.
  - The Call African-American newspaper founded by Chester A. Franklin.
  - Guadalupe Center founded.
  - Donnelly Garment Company founded.
  - The Imperial Brewing Company Brewery became the Boulevard Mill after Prohibition.
- 1920
  - Kansas City Monarchs baseball team established in the Negro National League.
  - University of Kansas Medical Center established.
  - AMC Theatres founded. (Originally Dubinsky Bros.)
  - Brookside Shopping District opens.
  - Population: 324,410.
- 1921
  - First annual installation of the Easter Bunnies on Country Club Plaza.
  - Laugh-O-Gram Studio founded by Walt Disney (closes 1923)
  - Monroe Hotel built.
- 1922
  - WPE radio begins broadcasting.
  - The Scout statue in Penn Valley Park is dedicated as a permanent memorial to local Indian tribes.
  - Our Lady of Sorrows Catholic Church built.
- 1923
  - Country Club Plaza opens.
  - Russell Stover Candies founded.
  - Fairyland Amusement Park opens at 75th & Prospect.
- 1924
  - New Rialto Theater opened 18th & Vine (Boone Theater)
  - J.E. Dunn Construction founded.
- 1925
  - Political boss Tom Pendergast becomes Chairman of the Jackson County Democratic Party.
  - Hotel President built.
  - Loose Park created.
  - Electric Park burned down after 18 years.
- 1926
  - Country Club Christian Church built at 61st & Ward Parkway. (Church formed 1920.)
  - Blues shouter and KC native Big Joe Turner performs and tends bar at The Sunset.
  - Ararat Shrine Temple and Bagdad Theatre open.
  - Liberty Memorial dedicated to World War I veterans, opens
- 1927
  - Downtown Airport opens, dedicated by Charles Lindbergh
  - Pioneer Mother Memorial in Penn Valley Park dedicated.
  - Southwest High School established.
- 1928
  - Uptown Theater opened.
  - June: 1928 Republican National Convention.
  - The Blue Room jazz club opened in the Street Hotel at 18th and Paseo. (Closed 1954)
  - Villa Serena Apartments (later, The Raphael Hotel) opened on the Country Club Plaza.
  - F. W. Woolworth Building constructed.
- 1929 - Count Basie joins the Bennie Moten Orchestra to play Kansas City jazz.
- 1930
  - Bryce B. Smith became mayor.
  - First official Plaza Lighting Ceremony took place on Thanksgiving night.
  - Kansas City Scottish Rite Temple completed.
- 1931
  - Kansas City Power and Light Building constructed.
  - Hotel Phillips built across from the Hotel Muehlbach.
  - Prominent businesswoman, Nell Donnelly Reed was abducted.
  - The Calvin Company began producing educational films.
- 1932 - First annual Plaza Art Fair held on the Country Club Plaza.
- 1933
  - Stroud's Restaurant opened.
  - The Sunset Jazz Club opened. (Closed 1938)
  - Kansas City Philharmonic established. (Dissolved 1982.)
  - May 27: Mary McElroy, daughter of City Manager Henry F. McElroy, was kidnapped for ransom.
  - June 17: Kansas City massacre at Union Station.
  - Nelson-Atkins Museum of Art opened.
  - Jackson County Courthouse built.
- 1934
  - March 27: Election day violence leaves 4 dead, 11 wounded.
  - Crime boss Johnny Lazia gunned down in front of his home.
  - Swope Memorial Golf Course opens.
- 1936 - Holy Land Christian Mission founded.
- 1937
  - Kansas City City Hall rebuilt.
  - Southeast High School established.
  - Charlie "Bird" Parker played jazz with Jay McShann in Kansas City.
- 1939 - Tom Pendergast convicted of income tax evasion and served 15 months.
- 1940
  - John B. Gage becomes mayor.
  - Kansas City Museum opens.
- 1942 - Hogan Preparatory Academy established.
- 1944 - Midwest Research Institute founded.
- 1945
  - Mining of SubTropolis underground storage began
  - Harry S. Truman Bridge (railroad bridge) completed.
  - Vice President Harry S Truman sworn in as President after Franklin Roosevelt dies.
- 1946
  - Linda Hall Library established.
  - William E. Kemp becomes mayor.
  - Gates Bar-B-Q founded by George and Arzelia Gates.
- 1948
  - Harry S Truman wins 1948 United States presidential election
  - First national leadership conference of the Future Homemakers of America (FHA), now Family Career and Community Leaders of America (FCCLA).
- 1949
  - The Golden Ox restaurant, originator of the Kansas City strip steak, opened.
  - Crest Drive-In cinema active (approximate date).
  - Richard Walker Bolling becomes U.S. representative for Missouri's 5th congressional district.
  - Industrial Bearings Transmission, now IBT, Inc. founded at 1625 Grand

=== 1950s-1990s ===
- 1950 - Starlight Theatre opened in Swope Park.
- 1951
  - July: Great Flood of 1951.
  - J.C.Hall commissions illustrator Norman Rockwell to paint The Kansas City Spirit in response to the flood.
- 1952 - Nell Donnelly Reed donates land for the James A. Reed Memorial Wildlife area.
- 1953 - The Donnelly Garment Company was the largest manufacturer of women's clothing worldwide.
  - Kidnapping and murder of Bobby Greenlease.
- 1954
  - U.S. Weather Bureau Severe Local Storms Unit relocated to Kansas City.
  - Paseo Bridge opens. (1954-2010)
  - First annual Jewel Ball is held.
- 1955
  - H&R Block founded
  - Philadelphia Athletics of the American League relocate becoming the Kansas City Athletics.
  - H. Roe Bartle becomes mayor.
  - TWA Corporate Headquarters Building was built in the Crossroads.
- 1956
  - First runway opens at Kansas City Industrial Airport, now KCI
  - Interstate Highway System begun.
  - Broadway Bridge built.
  - Robert Altman's first film The Delinquents shot in Kansas City.
  - The Carriage Club was founded.
- 1957
  - Kansas City Ballet founded.
  - Ruskin Heights Tornado (F-5).
  - Last electric streetcar retired.
  - Russ Fiorella opens Smoke Stack Barbecue.
  - KCUR-FM radio went on the air.
  - Blue Ridge Mall opened.
- 1959
  - Five KC firefighters killed in gas tank explosion on Southwest Blvd.
  - Ward Parkway Center opened.
- 1960 - Mill Creek Fountain (created in 1910) installed on the Country Club Plaza.
- 1961
  - Freedom, Inc. founded.
  - Hickman Mills annexed.
- 1963
  - Lamar Hunt relocates the Dallas Texans to become the Kansas City Chiefs
  - University of Missouri–Kansas City established.
  - Ilus W. Davis becomes mayor.
  - Bruce R. Watkins elected as first African-American city council member.
  - Martin City annexed.
- 1964 - Kansas City Repertory Theatre founded
- 1966 - Lockton insurance founded.
- 1967
  - Kansas City Chiefs lose the first Super Bowl to the Green Bay Packers
  - Kansas City Athletics relocate to Oakland at the conclusion of the season
  - The Giralda Tower constructed on the Country Club Plaza.
  - Sister city relationship established with Seville, Spain.
- 1968 - April: 1968 Kansas City, Missouri riot.
- 1969
  - Kansas City Royals baseball team formed.,
  - Kansas City Chiefs win Super Bowl IV
- 1970
  - Universal Press Syndicate founded.
  - Missouri State Representative Leon Jordan was assassinated.
  - Population: 507,330.
- 1971
  - Charles Wheeler becomes mayor.
  - Satchel Paige of the Kansas City Monarchs inducted into the Baseball Hall of Fame.
  - Crown Center opens.
- 1972
  - Arrowhead Stadium opens
  - NBA Cincinnati Royals became the Kansas City Kings
  - Kansas City International Airport becomes the city's primary passenger airport
  - Sister city relationship established with Kurashiki, Japan.
- 1973
  - Worlds of Fun opens.
  - Kauffman Stadium opens as Royals Stadium.
  - Andrews McMeel Publishing founded.
  - City of Fountains Foundation founded.
  - Sister city relationship established with Morelia, Mexico.
- 1974
  - Revival of the Kansas City St. Patrick's Day Parade
  - First Hospital Hill Run takes place with 99 runners.
  - Kemper Arena opens.
  - NHL comes to Kansas City with the establishment of the Scouts as an expansion team
  - Black Archives of Mid-America founded by Horace M. Peterson III.
  - Sister city relationship established with Freetown, Sierra Leone.
- 1975
  - Kansas City Kings basketball team comes to Kemper Arena.
  - Mid America Heart Institute opens.
  - Edge of Hell (Kansas City) opens
- 1976
  - Bartle Hall Convention Center opened
  - 1976 Republican National Convention held in Kemper Arena.
  - World Science Fiction Convention held.
- 1977
  - River Quay bombings
  - Fairyland Park closes after extensive damage by windstorm.
- 1978
  - Coates House Hotel fire claimed 20 lives.
  - Artist Christo installs "Wrapped Walk Ways" in Loose Park.
  - Sister city relationship established with Tainan, Taiwan.
- 1979
  - Richard L. Berkley becomes mayor.
  - The Coterie Theatre is founded.
  - Kansas City Comets indoor soccer team. (1979-1991)
  - Kemper Arena roof collapsed.
- 1980
  - Hyatt Regency hotel opens.
  - The Kansas City Royals lose World Series to the Philadelphia Phillies
  - The Pitch alternative newspaper founded.
  - Bannister Mall opened.
- 1981 - July 17: Hyatt Regency walkway collapse.
- 1982
  - Kansas City Symphony established.
  - Kansas City Business Journal founded.
  - Oceans of Fun opens
  - National Museum of Toys and Miniatures opens
  - Kansas City Chorale founded.
- 1983 - Bobby Bell of the Kansas City Chiefs inducted into the Pro Football Hall of Fame.
- 1985
  - World Series won by Kansas City Royals with Manager Dick Howser
  - Harris-Kearney House opens as a museum.
- 1986 - Town Pavilion hi-rise built.
- 1987 - Len Dawson of the Kansas City Chiefs inducted into the Pro Football Hall of Fame.
- 1988
  - ACT UP chapter founded.
  - One Kansas City Place built.
  - Serial killer Bob Berdella apprehended as "Kansas City Butcher"
  - Professional golfer Tom Watson inducted into the World Golf Hall of Fame.
  - November 29: Construction site explosion kills 6 firefighters
- 1989
  - Boulevard Brewing Company founded
  - Sister city relationship established with Xi'an, China.
- 1990
  - Mr. & Mrs. Bridge filmed in Kansas City starring Paul Newman and Joanne Woodward released.
  - The Negro Leagues Baseball Museum founded.
  - Buck Buchanan of the Kansas City Chiefs inducted into Pro Football Hall of Fame.
  - The Kansas City Times ceased publication.
  - Kansas City Blades hockey team founded. (1990-2001)
  - Population: 435,146.
- 1991
  - Emanuel Cleaver becomes mayor.
  - Kansas City Stockyards close.
  - Firefighters' Memorial Fountain dedicated at 31st & Broadway
  - The Arabia Steamboat Museum opens in the River Market.
  - Sister city relationship established with Guadalajara, Mexico.
- 1993
  - Great Flood of 1993
  - Sister city relationships established with Hannover, Germany and Port Harcourt, Nigeria.
- 1994 -
  - Artist Claes Oldenburg installs Shuttlecocks at the Nelson-Atkins Museum.
  - Sky Stations sculptures installed on pylons of Bartle Hall.
  - Kemper Museum of Contemporary Art opens.
  - Stowers Institute for Medical Research established.
- 1995
  - Kansas City Wiz soccer team founded by Lamar Hunt.
  - Sister city relationship established with Arusha, Tanzania.
- 1996
  - Hilton Flamingo Riverboat Casino opened. (Now Bally's Kansas City)
  - Kansas City, a Robert Altman crime film is released.
- 1997
  - Station Casino opened. (Now Ameristar Casino.)
  - City website goes online (approximate date).
  - American Jazz Museum opens.
  - Sister city relationship established with San Nicolás de los Garza, Mexico.
- 1998
  - Lidia's Kansas City opened in the Freight House.
  - Sister city relationship established with Ramla, Israel.
- 1999
  - Kay Barnes becomes mayor.
  - Union Station reopens after restoration.
  - George Brett of the Kansas City Royals inducted into Baseball Hall of Fame.
  - Pro wrestler Owen Hart falls 70 feet to his death at Kemper arena.
  - Randie Carver, North American Boxing Federation super-middleweight died defending his title.

== 21st century ==
- 2000
  - Ewing and Muriel Kauffman Memorial Garden opened.
  - Population: 441,545.
- 2001
  - New Chouteau Bridge completed.
  - Regional Kansas City SmartPort economic development group established.
- 2002 - First Fridays began in the Crossroads Art District
- 2003 - First Kansas City Irish Fest at Crown Center.
- 2004
  - Zona Rosa urban shopping district opened.
  - Sister city relationship established with Metz, France.
- 2005
  - Penn Valley skatepark opens.
  - Emanuel Cleaver becomes U.S. representative for Missouri's 5th congressional district.
- 2006
  - Modern glass Kansas City Star Building built.
  - Historic Pencoyd Railroad Bridge moved to Union Station to become the Freight House Pedestrian Bridge.
- 2007
  - Sprint Center (arena) opens.
  - H&R Block World Headquarters built.
  - Irish Museum and Cultural Center opens.
  - Mark Funkhouser becomes mayor.
  - The Bloch Building addition of the Nelson-Atkins Museum of Art opens.
- 2008 - Kansas City Power & Light District completed.
- 2009 - Andrews McMeel Syndication founded.
- 2010
  - The Big Slick, an annual celebrity fundraiser for Children's Mercy Hospital.
  - Christopher S. Bond Bridge opens, replacing demolished Paseo Bridge
  - Population: 459,787.
- 2011
  - Kauffman Center for the Performing Arts opens.
  - Todd Bolender Center for Dance and Creativity opened. (Remodeled from Union Station Power House, built in 1914.)
  - Sly James becomes mayor.
  - Population: 463,202; metro 2,052,676.
- 2012
  - Google Fiber service begins.
  - Legendary Kansas City broadcaster, Walt Bodine dies.
  - Kansas City Startup Village established.
- 2013
  - Kansas City Sculpture Park renamed to honor Donald J. Hall, Jr.
  - JJ's Restaurant on the Plaza destroyed by gas explosion; 1 fatality, 15 injured.
- 2014
  - Liberty Memorial officially designated The National World War I Monument and Museum.
  - J. Rieger & Co. distillery re-established after 95 years
- 2015
  - World Series won by Kansas City Royals
  - Knuckleheads Saloon music venue opened in the East Bottoms.
- 2016
  - KC Streetcar entered service.
  - Broadway Bridge renamed Buck O'Neil Bridge.
- 2019
  - Quinton Lucas elected mayor
  - Artist Andy Goldsworthy installs "Walking Wall" at Nelson-Atkins Museum of Art.
- 2020 - Kansas City Chiefs win Super Bowl LIV
- 2021
  - Renovated Museum of Kansas City reopens.
  - Chiefs lose Super Bowl LV
- 2022
  - Buck O'Neil of the Kansas City Monarchs inducted into Baseball Hall of Fame.
  - Kansas City Public Schools regain full accreditation.
- 2023
  - Chiefs win Super Bowl LVII
  - New KCI airport terminal opens.
  - New Kansas City flag design adopted.
- 2024
  - Chiefs win Super Bowl LVIII
  - Kansas City Parade Shooting
- 2025
  - Chiefs win AFC Championship.
  - Chiefs lost Super Bowl LIX.
- 2026
  - 2026 FIFA World Cup Venue

== See also ==
- List of mayors of Kansas City, Missouri
- History of the Kansas City metropolitan area
- Timeline of St. Louis

== Bibliography ==
=== 19th century publications ===
- Business directory, 1866
- Theo. S. Case, ed. (1888). History of Kansas City, Missouri. Syracuse, N.Y.: D. Mason.
- William Griffith (1900), History of Kansas City, Kansas City, Mo: Hudson-Kimberly Pub. Co., OCLC 181275439, OL 23304661M

=== 20th century publications ===
- "Kansas City, Mo.". Kansas State Gazetteer and Business Directory, including a complete business directory of Kansas City, Mo. R.L. Polk & Co. 1908.
- Carrie Westlake Whitney (1908), Kansas City, Missouri: its History and its People 1808-1908, Chicago: S.J. Clarke Publishing Co., OL 6544377M
- "Kansas City (Missouri)" . Encyclopædia Britannica. Vol. 15 (11th ed.). 1910. pp. 661–662.
- Federal Writers' Project (1941), "Kansas City", Missouri: A Guide to the 'Show Me' State, American Guide Series, New York: Duell, Sloan and Pearce
- "Kansas City, Heartland U.S.A.", National Geographic Magazine, vol. 150, Washington DC, 1976
- Ory Mazar Nergal, ed. (1980), "Kansas City, MO", Encyclopedia of American Cities, New York: E.P. Dutton, p. 179+, OL 4120668M
- Rick Montgomery; Shirl Kasper (1999). Kansas City: An American Story. Kansas City Star Books. ISBN 978-0-9604884-0-7.

=== 21st century publications ===
- Paul S. Boyer, ed. (2001). "Kansas City". Oxford Companion to United States History. Oxford University Press. p. 417. ISBN 978-0-19-508209-8.
- Wishart, David J., ed. (2004). "Cities and Towns: Kansas City, Kansas and Missouri". Encyclopedia of the Great Plains. University of Nebraska Press. ISBN 0-8032-4787-7.
- American Cities Project (2013). "Kansas City (MO)". America's Big Cities in Volatile Times: City Profiles. Washington, DC: Pew Charitable Trusts.
- William S. Worley (2002). Kansas City: Rise of a Regional Metropolis. Heritage Media Corp.
- James R. Shortridge (2012). Kansas City and How it Grew, 1822-2011. University of Press of Kansas.
- Mildred Ray. Kansas City Public Library. "Armour Meat Packing".
