= Charles S. Keith House =

Historic house in Missouri, United States

- U.S. National Register of Historic Places
- Location within Missouri Location within the United States
- Location: 1214 W. 55th St., Kansas City, Missouri
- Coordinates: 39°1′51″N 94°36′20″W
- Built: 1914
- Architect: Shepard, Farrar & Wiser; Hare & Hare
- Architectural style: Colonial Revival
- NRHP reference No.: 00000308
- Added to NRHP: March 31, 2000

The Charles S. Keith House, also known as the J. C. Nichols House, is a historic residence located at 1214 West 55th Street in Kansas City, Missouri. The 2 1/2-story Georgian Revival house sits on a three-acre tract in the Kansas City's Country Club District near Ward Parkway.

== History ==
The Charles S. Keith House was designed by Kansas City architectural firm Shepard, Farrar & Wiser in 1913, and construction was completed on the residence in 1914. Charles S. Keith was a lumber baron and president of the Central Coal & Coke Company. Keith sold the palatial estate to well known Kansas City real estate developer J.C. Nichols in 1920 after deciding the house was more than he needed. Nichols lived in the house until he died in 1950. After the sale of the house, Charles Keith later went on to gain additional public notoriety when he accepted the position of interim mayor of Kansas City in 1940 between Bryce B. Smith's resignation and the inauguration of John B. Gage.

== Architecture ==
The house has twenty two rooms, plus six full bathrooms and numerous smaller storage spaces. Exterior features included the use of elaborate cut-stone trim work, multiple pergolas, and a large carriage house. The three acre grounds were designed by Kansas City landscape architecture firm Hare and Hare, and they originally included formal gardens, a lily pool and vegetable plot.
