= Georgia Bullock Lloyd =

American fashion designer

Georgia Bullock Lloyd (born Mildred Georgia Bullock; August 6, 1918 – June 7, 1991) was an American fashion designer.

== Early life and education ==
Mildred Georgia Bullock was born in Whittier, California on August 6, 1918. She found her flair for fashion design at an early age when she would make clothes for her dolls that matched the latest trends and styles. She later developed that flair when, while attending USC, she worked as a floor model and sales associate at a large department store in Los Angeles in the mid-1930s. After graduating from college, she began working at Bullock's Willshire as a floor model. The names were purely coincidental, as she had no relation to the store-owners. After that she was hired by a milliner, or a hat designer for women, and then an established fashion designer. Realizing this was something she wanted to pursue even further, Georgia then studied at Frank Wiggins Trade School in Los Angeles. All of her work in stores and with customers helped prepare her for her career in fashion.

== Career in fashion ==
In 1941, she and her partner, Dorothy Phillips, and $50, created a company based on Georgia's one idea for a black dress. This business lasted two years and by 1943, she was doing business by herself. She was only 25 years old. At first she started off doing all the work in a small factory but then, over the years, she began selling her clothes nationally and was being quoted in national newspapers. While designing she always kept in mind the different shapes and sizes of her customers, trying to make clothes that would flatter all of them, backing up her fashion philosophy. Her designs have been described as having "high style with simple elegance".

In the early 1950s, she had a factory in Hollywood, working on her own clothing line as well as taking up a job in Kansas City for the well known clothing company "Nellie Don" in 1953, all while working from Los Angeles. At first her style was suave and sophisticated, but then she slowly tried to widen the horizon and appeal to other crowds by doing a line of sportswear that seemed elegant and presenting her fashion shows on tennis courts and large estates to draw in the country club crowd. Huge department stores such as Saks, I. Magnin's, and Bullock's Willshire, all sold her clothing. They were also seen on the Danny Thomas television show Make Room for Daddy.

In 1963, she opened up her own line called "Miss Georgia". This line was cheaper than her other lines (it was around $50). It was more fashion forward than the other lines, being more fashion forward and bold. Her last years as a designer were in the 1970s.

== Achievements ==
In 1966, she received the Designer of the Year Award for her work.

== Personal life ==
In 1948, she was married to Jack Dunbar and had two children (Sandal and Scot), she continued to work, but the marriage later ended in 1961. She remarried in 1962 to Weston Jones Lloyd (1918–1988), that produced her third child, Cynthia. On June 7, 1991, Georgia died from complications from Alzheimer's disease in Santa Monica, California.
