= Kansas City Fire Department =

Government agency in Missouri, USA

Operational area
- Country: United States
- State: Missouri
- City: Kansas City

Agency overview
- Annual budget: $188 million (2019)
- Staffing: Career
- Fire chief: Craig Buckley
- IAFF: 42, 3808

Facilities and equipment
- Battalions: 7
- Stations: 35
- Engines: 33
- Tillers: 3
- Platforms: 9
- Squads: 12
- Rescues: 3
- Ambulances: 27 static, 5 ALS dynamic, 5 BLS dynamic
- HAZMAT: 1
- Airport crash: 5
- Wildland: 3
- Rescue boats: 2
- Light and air: 1

Website
- Official website
- IAFF website

The Kansas City Fire Department is the fire department that provides fire protection and emergency medical service for Kansas City, Missouri, and under contract to Village of the Oaks, Village of Oakwood Park, and Village of Oakwood. It provides fire protection only under contract to City of Lake Waukomis, City of Platte Woods, City of Weatherby Lake, and Village of Ferrelview. In addition, it provides EMS support under contract for the City of Riverside. It operates 35 fire stations, one dedicated EMS operations facility housing dynamically deployed ambulances, organized into seven battalions and cover 318 square miles (820 km^{2}).

== History ==
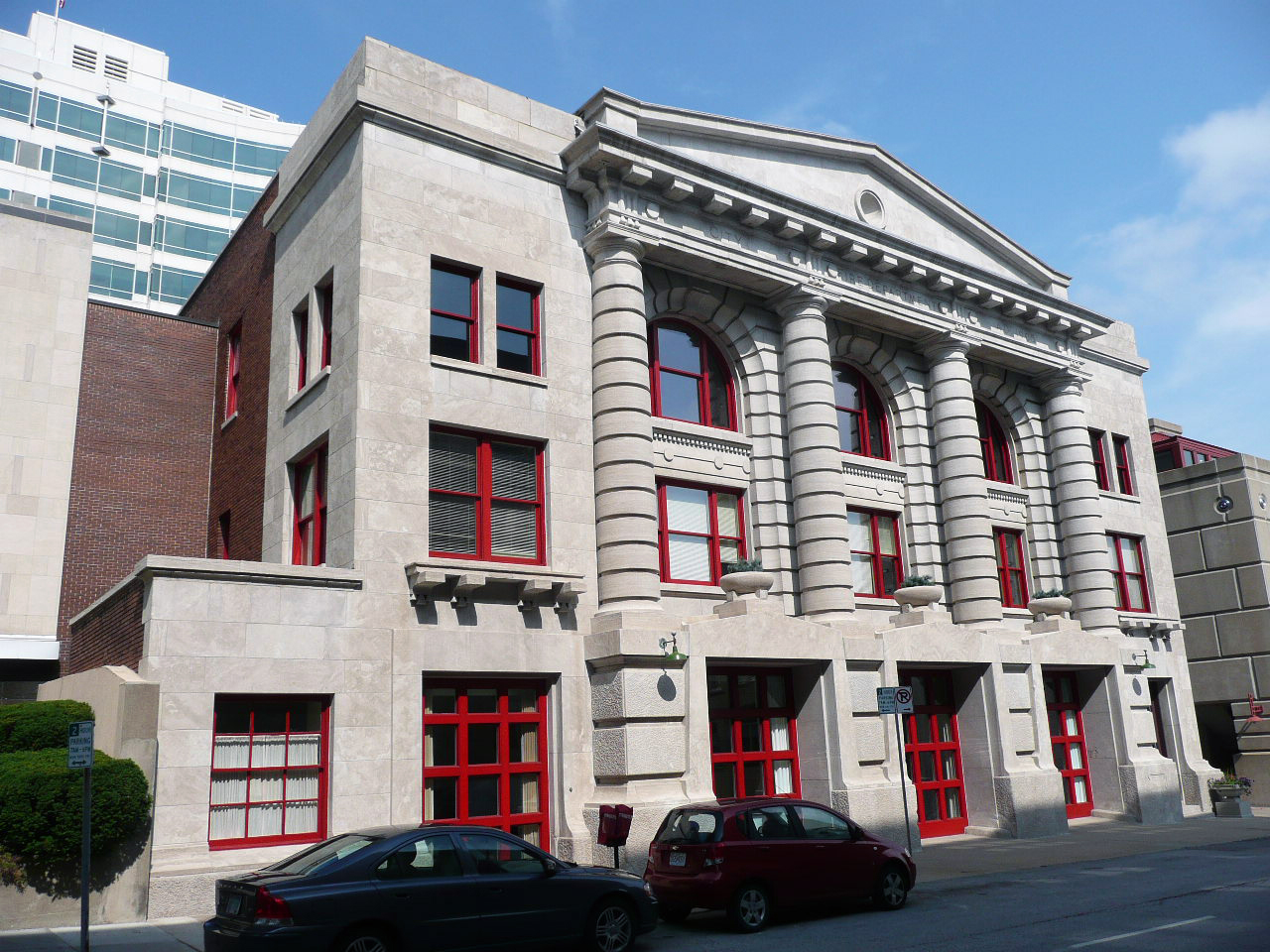
Fire Department Headquarters; Fire Station No. 2

The Kansas City Fire Department first originated with the formation of volunteer bucket brigades as early as 1858. Church bells rung to signal a fire alarm and members would assemble at the scene to help. In 1867, the city abandoned the voluntary bucket brigade for a paid fire department, and Colonel Frank Foster was elected as its first chief.

The first ladder company was organized in 1869, named McGee Hook and Ladder 1 in honor of former mayor Elijah Milton McGee. By 1872, the department consisted of three steamers, one hook and ladder, one chemical engine, and 36 paid professional firefighters.

In 1877, not long after the city water works had been established, the city leaders thought that there would be sufficient water pressure to fight fires. The fire chief was ordered to remove all of the steamers from service and reduce the force to only 14 men. Shortly thereafter, there was a disastrous fire in the West Bottoms. The KCFD was only able to respond with hose wagons and suffered from low water pressure. As a result, the entire block was threatened and several buildings were destroyed. The steamers were placed back in service the next day.

In 1882, George C. Hale was appointed Chief of the KCFD, a role he held for 31 years. During this time, the KCFD twice represented the United States as the "American Fire Team" at International Fire Congress: London in 1893 and a Paris exposition in 1900. The London competition simulated a night alarm. The men began the race turned out in bed, had to descend a flight of stairs, harness and hitch the horses, and clear the engine house. The best time in Europe was 77.5 seconds, but was handily beaten in 8.5 seconds by the team from Kansas City. The KCFD fire crew won a similar competition at the National Fireman's Tournament in Omaha in 1898. Hale, once known as the world's most famous fireman, revolutionized fire fighting with his more than 60 patented firefighting inventions, including the Hale water tower, the swinging (horse) harness, the rotary tin roof cutter, and the telephone fire alarm. Chief Hale remains one of the most revered to ever head the KCFD.

By the 1920s, the fire department had grown to 30 stations and 40 companies. In 1928, the first training school opened and the department was fully motorized. 1940 saw a new beginning for the department with 198 new hires, but manpower was depleted with enlistments for World War II. In 1956, a third platoon was installed.

On August 18, 1959, the Kansas City Fire Department was hit with their largest loss of life in the line of duty to that date, when a 25,000 U.S. gallons (95,000 liters) gasoline tank exploded during a fire on Southwest Boulevard, killing five firefighters. This was the first time the term "BLEVE" (Boiling liquid expanding vapor explosion) was used to describe the explosion of a burning fuel tank.

On July 17, 1981, the department responded to the Hyatt Regency walkway collapse, which killed 114 people during a tea dance.

On November 29, 1988, the fire department was struck with another tragedy when an ammonium nitrate explosion killed six fire fighters. The memorial service at Arrowhead Stadium received over 5,000 fire fighters in attendance from the United States and around the world. As a result of this tragedy, a hazardous materials team was created and named HazMat 71 in honor of the companies, Pumpers 30 and 41, that lost men in the explosion.

In 1991, the Firefighters Fountain was dedicated at 31st Street and Broadway in Penn Valley Park to all firefighters who have fallen in the line of duty throughout the city's history.

On April 25, 2010, Kansas City's ambulance service, Metropolitan Ambulance Services Trust ("MAST") merged into the Kansas City Fire Department.

On October 12, 2015, the fire department experienced more tragedy when a wall collapsed during a fire on Independence Avenue and killed two firefighters. The fire was the result of arson and the owner of one of the businesses destroyed in the fire has been charged with one count of first-degree arson and two counts of second-degree murder or felony murder since the firefighters died as a result of the arson. The Kansas City Royals, who had an amazing come from behind win in game 4 of the American League Division Series against the Houston Astros on the same day the firefighters were killed, showed their support for the firefighting community by wearing KCFD shirts and hats during their workout day at Kauffman Stadium before Game 5 of the ALDS and honored the fallen firefighters during pregame ceremonies. On May 24, 2016, a 68-page report “Internal Investigation into the Line of Duty Deaths of Fire Apparatus Operator Larry Leggio Firefighter John Mesh” was released.

== Stations and apparatus ==
Fire Station Number	Neighborhood	Pumper Company	Truck Company	Medic Unit	Battalion Chief Unit	Specialized Units
3	Nashua	Pumper 3	Truck 4			
4	Line Creek	Pumper 4		Medic 4	Battalion 108	
5	Kansas City Airport					Rescue 92, Rescue 93, Rescue 94
6	Avondale	Pumper 6	Truck 12	Medic 506		
7	Westside	Pumper 9	Truck 6	Medic 9		High Rise 102
8	Crossroads	Pumper 8			Battalion 102	
10	Pendleton Heights	Pumper 10	Truck 3	Medic 503, Medic 510		
14	Shoal Creek	Pumper 14		Medic 14	Battalion 103	Command 2
15	Staley	Pumper 15		Medic 515		Brush 15
16	Kansas City Overhaul Base	Pumper 16		Medic 516		Brush 16
17	Hyde Park	Pumper 17	Truck 2			Rescue 31
18	Ingleside	Pumper 18	Truck 5	Medic 505, Medic 18		
19	Westport	Pumper 19	Truck 7	Medic 19, Medic 507	Battalion 106	
23	Northeast	Pumper 23	Truck 10		Battalion 104	
24	Blue Valley	Pumper 24		Medic 524		
25	Little Italy	Pumper 25				Rescue 1
27	Sheffield	Pumper 27		Medic 527		Utility 71, HazMat 71, Foam Tanker 1
28	Red Bridge	Pumper 28		Medic 528		
29	Brookside	Pumper 29	Truck 11	Medic 29		
30	Marlborough	Pumper 30		Medic 30		
33	East Swope Highlands	Pumper 33		Medic 533		Brush 33
34	Winnwood	Pumper 34		Medic 34		
35	Swope Parkway	Pumper 35		Medic 35	Battalion 105	Rescue 9, Rescue Support 75
36	Indian Creek	Pumper 36	Truck 15	Medic 36	Battalion 107	
37	Waldo	Pumper 37		Medic 537		
38	Gashland	Pumper 38		Medic 38		
39	Royal Meadows	Pumper 39	Truck 13	Medic 39		
40	Englewood	Pumper 40		Medic 540	EMS DVC 130	
41	Hickman Mills	Pumper 41	Truck 8	Medic 41		
42	Ruskin Heights	Pumper 42		Medic 42		
43	Knobtown	Pumper 43				
44	Zona Rosa	Pumper 44				
45	Martin City	Pumper 45				
47	East Bottoms	Pumper 47				Command 1, Utility 1, Air & Light Support
63	Downtown Airport					Rescue 63, Rescue 64

== Notable incidents ==
=== Hyatt Regency walkway collapse ===
The KCFD was the primary agency that responded to the Hyatt Regency walkway collapse which occurred at the Hyatt Regency Kansas City in Kansas City on Friday, July 17, 1981. Two vertically contiguous walkways collapsed onto a tea dance being held in the hotel's lobby. The falling walkways killed 114 and injured a further 216 people. At the time, it was the deadliest structural collapse in U.S. history, not surpassed until the collapse of the south tower of the World Trade Center in 2001.

== See also ==
- Fire Department Headquarters; Fire Station No. 2
