= Charles S. Keith =

American businessman and politician (1873–1945)

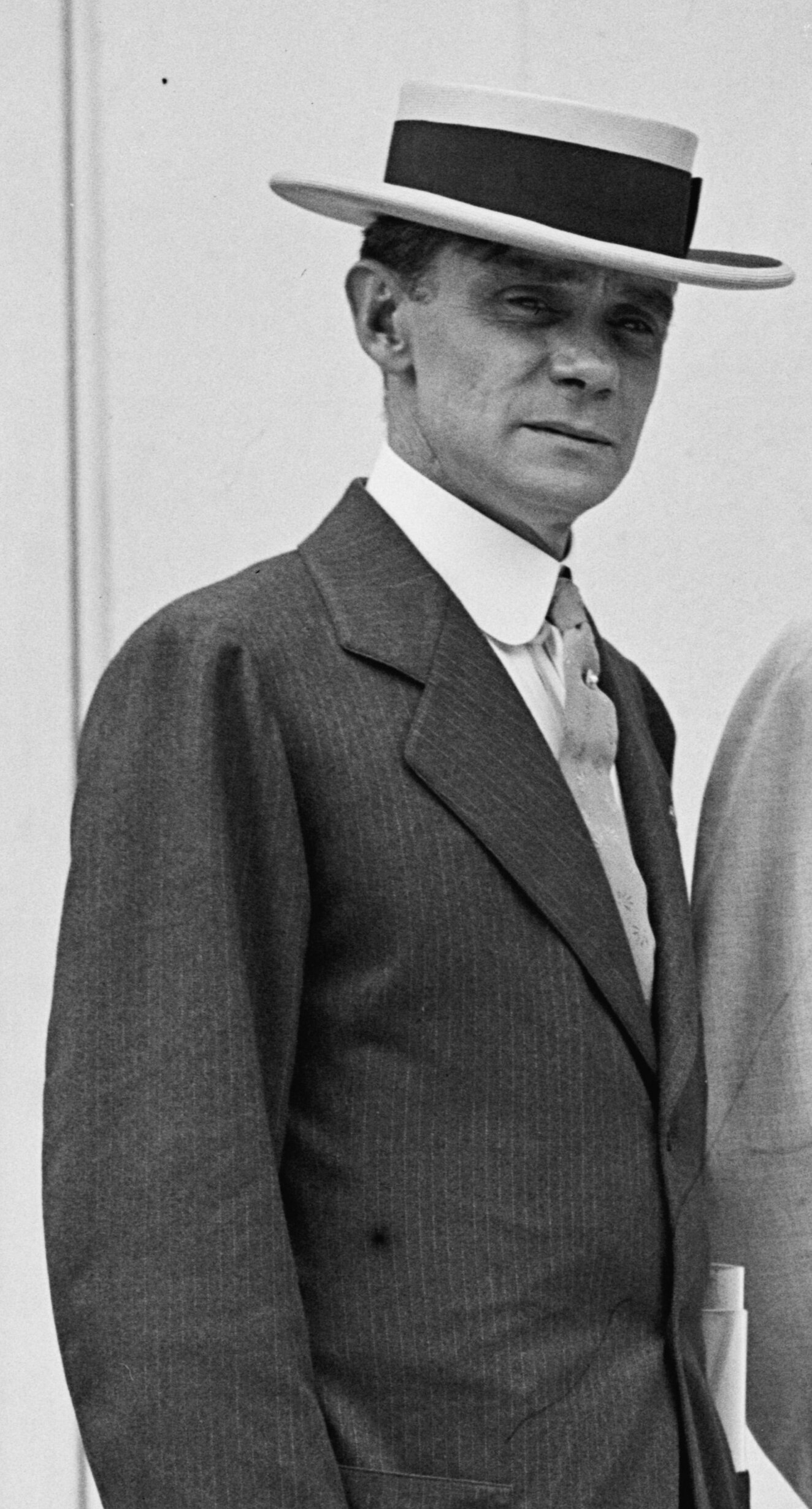
- Keith in 1914

44th Mayor of Kansas City, Missouri
- In office January 22, 1940 – April 17, 1940
- Preceded by: Bryce B. Smith
- Succeeded by: John B. Gage

Personal details
- Born: Charles Smith Keith; January 28, 1873; Kansas City, Missouri, U.S.
- Died: October 9, 1945 (aged 72); Kansas City, Missouri, U.S.
- Resting place: Mount Washington Cemetery; Independence, Missouri, U.S.
- Spouse(s): Jane Ormsby Gregg (m. 1895; died 1897) Lucille Hall (m. 1900)
- Children: 1
- Parent: Richard H. Keith (father)
- Education: St. Mary's College
- Alma mater: Fordham University
- Occupation: Businessman; politician; banker

Charles Smith Keith (January 28, 1873 – October 9, 1945) was a coal and lumber businessman from Kansas City, Missouri. He served as mayor of Kansas City from January to April 1940.

== Early life ==
Charles Smith Keith was born on January 28, 1873, in Kansas City, Missouri, to Richard H. Keith. His father was a colonel of the Confederate States Army in the Civil War and founder of the Central Coal and Coke Company. He attended public schools in Kansas City. He attended St. Mary's College in St. Marys, Kansas and graduated from Fordham University in Fordham, New York.

== Career ==
In 1891, Keith started working at the Central Coal and Coke Company and as a clerk at the auditor's office in Kansas City. After nine months in the auditor's office, Keith studied mining and practicing engineering in Kansas. After six months in Missouri, Keith became a traveling sales agent for the Central Coal and Coke Company. After three years, Keith became the general sales agent of the coal department. Keith took an interest in lumber and in 1896 he was appointed as general sales agent of the lumber department. In 1901, Keith became assistant general manager and general sales agent. In 1902, Keith replaced his father as general manager of the company. After his father's death in 1906, Keith became the vice president of the company along with maintaining his role as general manager. From 1915 to 1919, Keith served as president of the Southern Pine Association. He also served on the board of the United States Chamber of Commerce.

During World War I, Keith was a member of the raw materials division of the Council of National Defense. In 1931, Central Coal and Coke Company entered receivership. In the 1930s, when the lumber industry was struggling, Keith worked to unite the lumber interests of the west coast, but was unsuccessful.

On January 22, 1940, Keith became Mayor of Kansas City after Mayor Bryce B. Smith resigned. He remained in office until April 17, 1940, when John B. Gage succeeded him.

Keith was also a bank director and street car director. Towards the end of his life, Keith was a director of the Kansas City Power & Light Company and the Lumbermen's Underwriting Alliance. He was chairman of the board of T. H. Mastin & Co. He also served as president of the Interstate Coal Operators Association and worked to find ways to keep deep vein mining profitable.

== Personal life ==
Keith married Jane Ormsby Gregg of Independence, Missouri, on April 25, 1895. His wife died on January 17, 1897. Keith married Lucille Hill of Keytesville, Missouri, on June 12, 1900. He had one child, Richard William.

In 1913, Keith bought three acres at 1214 West 55th Street in Kansas City. He built the Charles S. Keith House there in 1914. The property was later sold to J. C. Nichols.

Keith died on October 9, 1945, at St. Luke's Hospital in Kansas City. He was buried at Mount Washington Cemetery in Independence.

Political offices
Preceded by Bryce B. Smith	Mayor of Kansas City, Missouri; 1940	Succeeded by John B. Gage
