= Municipal Ambulance Services Trust =

Metropolitan Ambulance Services Trust logo

Metropolitan Ambulance Services Trust ("MAST") is a former non-profit EMS agency that was the sole ambulance provider for Kansas City, Missouri. On April 25, 2010, MAST was merged into the Kansas City Fire Department to operate as one municipal services department. There are now 21 Statically Deployed ALS transport ambulances deployed from 19 different Fire Stations, with additional Dynamically deployed ALS transport ambulances scheduled throughout each day, totalling 33 dynamic shifts.

== About MAST ==
MAST originated in 1979 with the city of Kansas City purchasing all private ambulance services operating within the City limits of Kansas City, Missouri. Between that time and until the merger with the local fire department MAST was the sole provider of prehospital emergency and non-emergency transport services in Kansas City, Missouri. The MAST Board of Trustees is appointed by the Mayor of Kansas City, Missouri and provides administrative oversight of the MAST System. The MAST board, through regular meetings, worked with the private contractor and the city's Emergency Physician Advisory Board (EPAB) to achieve the goals of the organization.

Until July, 2003 the MAST System operated as a Public Utility Model with MAST, the City Health Department, and the Emergency Physicians Advisory Board (EPAB) providing system structure, while a private EMS Contractor operated the system.

The initial provider winning the bid through a R.F.P. process was Medecvac MidAmerica, now a wholly owned subsidiary of American Medical Response (AMR). In July 1988 the contract was assigned to Emergency Providers Inc. (EPI). EPI had been formed as an employee owned corporation by the employee working in the MAST system.

Beginning July, 2003 - the MAST Board elected not to contract services with a private ambulance company, but instead decided to operate the MAST Ambulance Service solely through the City of Kansas City, MO. Today, all components of the MAST System are directed by the MAST Board of Trustees, the City Health Department, and the Emergency Physicians Advisory Board. Operations of the system occur within the city structure and there are no private ambulance contractors operating within the city of Kansas City, MO. MAST operates as a 501(c)(3) non-profit organization. Physician oversight is provided by EPAB and the Kansas City, Missouri Department of Health.

Between 1979 and 2010, MAST was the sole provider of Emergency Medical Services for Kansas City, Missouri. MAST's primary service area included Kansas City, Missouri, and the communities of Parkville, Ferrellview, Farley, Weatherby Lake, Lake Waukomis, Platte Woods, Houston Lake, Riverside, Northmoor, Oaks, Oakwood, Oakwood Park, Oakview, Avondale, and portions of Unincorporated Platte County. Between 1995 and 2004 MAST also provided services in Kansas City, Ks. MAST also provides non-emergency services throughout the Kansas City metropolitan area.

The field, communications, supply, and maintenance personnel working for MAST were members of the International Association of Firefighters, Local 34 of Greater Kansas City, Missouri. They became members of Local 42 after the merger with the fire department.

== Facts about MAST ==
MAST covered over 420 square miles (1,100 km^{2}), with a full-time population of about 588,000, and a day time population around 1.2 million. In later years system resources were managed by a GPS-based vehicle location service called MARVLIS. Using system status management, ambulances were posted throughout the city based on predicted call need that changes hour by hour. At its peak, the forecasted demands of the system changed every 15 minutes. System Status Controllers (SSC's) in the MAST offices monitored each vehicle's location on a real-time map of the coverage area. To ensure rapid response times, ambulances were continuously positioned at post locations throughout the city by the SSC's.

When a 911 call came into the dispatch center, the call taker established a nature of the call, and passed along this information to the SSC who dispatched the closest ambulance. To fill the hole created by the responding unit, other ambulances were routed to provide a changing matrix of coverage. Hour by hour, as the city population moves, ambulances were continually repositioned to provide optimal coverage. As of March 2008, MAST had met its response time requirements for 38 consecutive months. MAST's response time requirements are some of the strictest in the nation.

=== Statistics ===
MAST Statistics for 2008:

- Approximately 88,000 calls
- Approximately 65,000 transports

=== Sport Event Coverage ===
MAST is tasked with the safety of covering major sporting events, as well as high school football, rodeo, and local parades. They also cover the Kansas City Chiefs and Kansas City Royals professional arenas.
