= Peter Grunauer =

Austrian chef

Peter Grunauer is a well known Austrian chef in New York City. He was the proprietor of Vienna 79, one of the few four star restaurants in New York City, and Vienna Park a three star Austrian concept located on Manhattan's Upper East Side.

== Career ==
After working as a server on a cruise ship, Peter got his start in the United States as a waiter at Brooklyn's famous Peter Luger Steak House from 1971 to 1973. This was followed by stints at the Waldorf Astoria Hotel as food and beverage manager, and later at Regines in New York, also as food and beverage manager.

In 1979, Peter was joined by Karl Zartler, who was his partner in the creation and operation of Vienna 79, a sixty-five seat fine dining restaurant located on 79th Street on New York's Upper East Side. Vienna 79 was awarded four stars by food critic Mimi Sheraton, writing for The New York Times. Peter and Karl operated Vienna 79 until it was sold in 1989. After the sale of Vienna 79, Peter created a chain of less-expensive bistros called Fledermaus. Fledermaus closed in 1996.

Since that time, Peter has played a variety of roles in the hospitality business, primarily as a food broker and as a food and restaurant consultant, which he continues to pursue at the present time.

Peter Grunauer, along with his son Nicholas and daughter Elisabeth, opened Grunauer in Kansas City, Missouri in May 2010. The restaurant is located in Kansas City's Crossroads Arts District and "focuses on authentic representations of classic Austrian and Continental European cuisine". Now adults, Nicholas and Elisabeth run the day-to-day operations at Grunauer, which is located in Kansas City's historic Freight House.

Peter is author of Viennese Cuisine: The New Approach, published by Doubleday in 1987.

== Personal life ==
Peter married TWA flight attendant Lynne Bielski in 1976, and they had two children: Elisabeth and Nicholas. The children were raised in Kansas City from the time they were teenagers.
