= Charles B. Wheeler Jr. =

American politician in Missouri (1926–2022)

Charles Wheeler
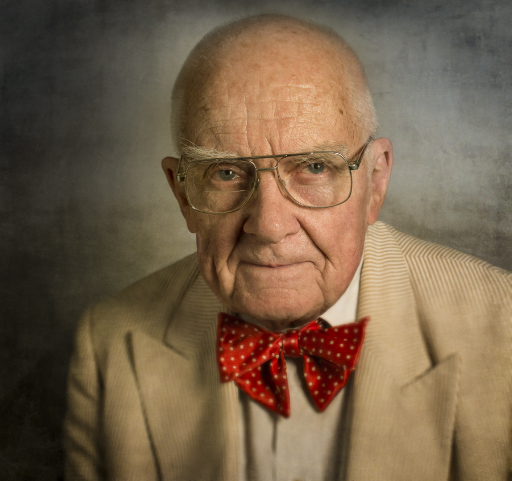

Member of the Missouri Senate from the 10th district
- In office January 2003 – January 2007
- Preceded by: Harry Wiggins
- Succeeded by: Jolie Justus

49th Mayor of Kansas City
- In office April 10, 1971 – April 10, 1979
- Preceded by: Ilus W. Davis
- Succeeded by: Richard L. Berkley

Judge of the Western District of the Jackson County Court
- In office January 1967 – January 1971

Coroner of Jackson County
- In office January 1965 – January 1967

Personal details
- Born: Charles Bertan Wheeler Jr. August 10, 1926 Kansas City, Missouri, U.S.
- Died: October 25, 2022 (aged 96) Kansas City, Missouri, U.S.
- Party: Democratic
- Spouse: Marjorie Martin Wheeler
- Children: 5
- Education: University of Missouri-Kansas City, University of Kansas

Charles Bertan Wheeler Jr. (August 10, 1926 – October 25, 2022) was an American physician and politician who served as a Missouri state senator and as mayor of Kansas City, Missouri from 1971 to 1979, in addition to having held other elected offices.

== Life and career ==
Born at Trinity Lutheran Hospital on August 10, 1926, Wheeler graduated from Westport High School in 1942. A third generation physician, Wheeler entered Kansas City Junior College in 1942, transferring to University of Louisville in 1944 and earned a B.A. in 1946. From March 1944 through February 1946, Wheeler was simultaneously serving in the US Navy. In 1946, he entered the University of Kansas, earning an M.D. in 1950. His internship was at Charity Hospital in New Orleans in 1950.

Wheeler joined the US Air Force in July 1950, serving until July 1953 as a captain and Flight Surgeon to the original group of the Thunderbirds, the Air Force aerial acrobatic team.

Wheeler did his pathology residency at St. Lukes Hospital in Kansas City, Missouri from 1953 to 1955. At the same time, he began studying at night for a law degree at the University of Kansas City School of Law, which he completed in 1959.

In 1957, Wheeler became an Associate Pathologist and Director of Laboratories at Kansas City General Hospital, followed by stints at Kansas City Research Hospital, North Kansas City Memorial Hospital, and the Independence Sanitarium and Hospital. He founded Wheeler Medical Laboratories in 1963.

Wheeler began his public career when he was elected Coroner of Jackson County, Missouri, in January 1965. He served in that office until January 1967, when he was elected as Judge of the Western District of the Jackson County Court until January 1971.

== Kansas City mayor ==
In 1971 he was elected to two consecutive terms as mayor of Kansas City. Although the office of mayor does not have a formal party affiliation in Kansas City, Wheeler was a Democrat. During his tenure he oversaw the financing and construction of both Kemper Arena and Bartle Hall Convention Center. The combination of the two enabled the city to host the 1976 Republican National Convention.

Many regard this as the last golden age of Kansas City

— Ingram's Magazine

Towards the end of his second term, Kansas City gained international attention hosting a work by the artist Christo, the 2.5 mile long Wrapped Walk Ways in Loose Park. Wheeler presented Christo and his partner Jeanne-Claude with the key to the city.

Kansas City International Airport opened in 1972 during his watch. It replaced the Kansas City Downtown Airport, which is now formally named for him. So much successful development happened during Wheeler's two terms as mayor that a 2002 profile in the conservative Kansas city business magazine Ingram's said: "Many regard this as the last golden age of Kansas City with the construction of KCI, Worlds of Fun, Crown Center, and the Truman Sports Complex."

Wheeler ran for the U.S. Senate in 1976 and garnered less than 2% of the vote in the Democratic primary in a race that was won by Jerry Litton, who died in a plane crash en route to the victory party in Kansas City. John C. Danforth ultimately won the position.

Wheeler ran for mayor of Kansas City one additional time in 2011, but his candidacy did not survive the primary.

== State senator ==
Wheeler defeated Rep. Henry Rizzo in the August 6, 2002, Democratic primary, and his other opponent Rep. Tom Hoppe did not collect enough signatures to run as an independent. No Republican ran in the election, and he was elected to the State Senate from the 10th District.

Wheeler opposed a bill to outlaw emergency contraception, explaining that "From Monday through Saturday, we have to work in a secular world", and was a co-sponsor of Missouri Senate Bill 458, the "Patient Protection Act" that would compel a pharmacist to fill any prescription.

Wheeler did not concurrently seek re-election to the senate and was succeeded by Democrat Jolie Justus in the 10th district seat.

== Post state senate elections ==
In 2006, at the age of 79, Wheeler ran for Jackson County Executive, but was defeated in the Democratic primary by county prosecutor Mike Sanders.

In 2008, Wheeler ran for the Democratic nomination for Missouri State Treasurer. He placed fourth behind the nominee Clint Zweifel, Andria Simckes and Mark Powell.

On March 28, 2016, at the age of 89 Wheeler filed to run for Governor of Missouri. He placed third in the primary with 7.9 percent in an election won by Chris Koster who had 78.08 percent of the vote.

== Doctor in Politics ==
Wheeler was the only physician in the Missouri State Senate. Having authored Doctor in Politics in 1974, Wheeler was a frequent lecturer and speaker. He had served as Assistant Clinical Professor of Pathology, University of Kansas Medical School, as well as adjunct professor and consultant to the University of Missouri–Kansas City School of Medicine and the Henry W. Bloch School of Business and Public Administration.

Wheeler was an American Diplomat of the Board of Pathology, certified in Pathologic Anatomy and Clinical Pathology, and, Forensic Pathology. He was recipient of the American Medical Association's Benjamin Rush Award (1981), the University of Missouri-Kansas City Lifetime Achievement Award (1984), and the Kansas University Medical Distinguished Alumnus Award (1997).

Political offices
Preceded by Ilus W. Davis	Mayor of Kansas City, Missouri; 1971–1979	Succeeded by Richard L. Berkley
Missouri Senate
Preceded by Harry Wiggins	Missouri State Senator from the 10th District; 2003–2007	Succeeded by Jolie Justus
