= Freight House (Kansas City, Missouri) =

Coordinates: 39.0875°N 94.5853°W

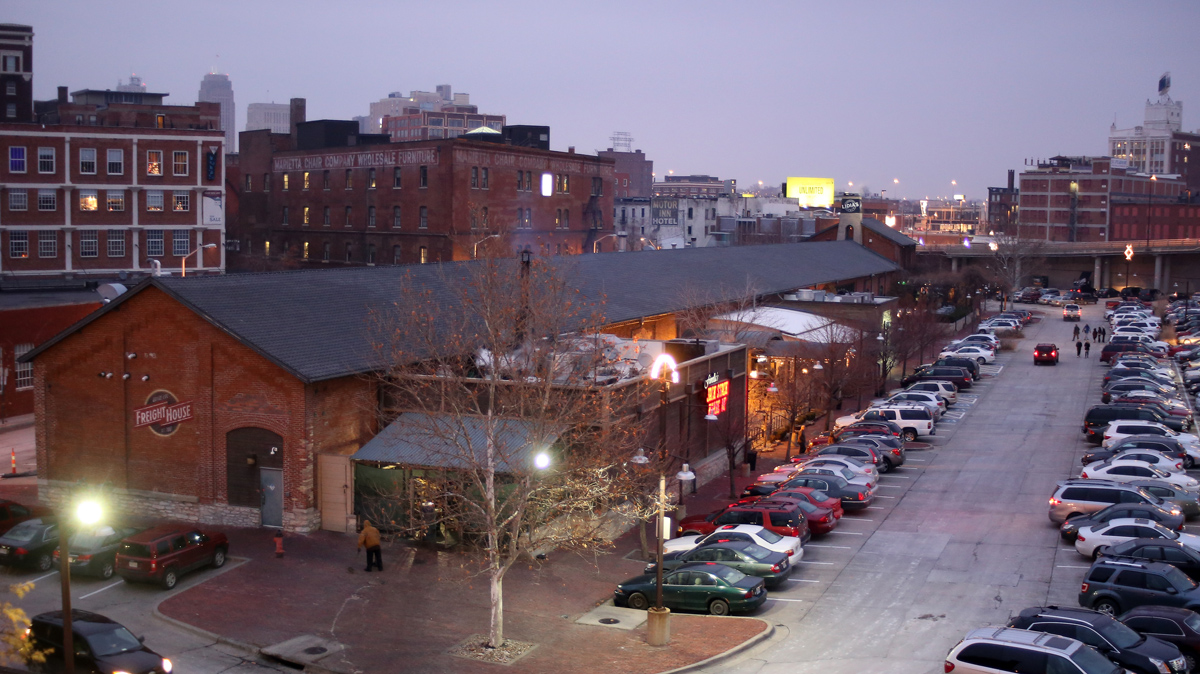
- Interactive map of the Freight House area

General information
- Location: 101 W 22nd St, Kansas City, Missouri
- Current tenants: Fiorella's Jack Stack Barbecue; Grunauer; Lidia’s Kansas City
- Completed: 1887
- Renovated: 1998

The Freight House is a historic railroad building just north of Union Station in the Crossroads Arts District of Kansas City, Missouri. The renovated Freight House is now home to three award-winning restaurants: Fiorella's Jack Stack Barbecue, Grunauer (German and Austrian food) and Lidia's. The building is located immediately east of the Stuart Hall Building, and it is connected via pedestrian bridge to Union Station. The pedestrian bridge was added in 2003, and its main component is an 1892 railroad span that had been sitting unused on the river bluffs until it was moved to its new location.

The Freight House was originally constructed in 1887. The building housed freight unloaded from the trains until merchants picked up the freight and transported it to the numerous warehouses nearby.

== Redevelopment ==
Over the years, the structure fell into severe disrepair until it was purchased by a group of investors in 1995. The 500-foot (150 m) long and 40-foot (12 m) wide Freight House would probably have been demolished, but the group of investors, led by Dan Clothier, envisioned developing three restaurants on the property.

The first restaurant to open at the Freight House was Lidia’s Kansas City. Lidia's is an Italian restaurant that was opened by celebrity chef Lidia Bastianich in October 1998. The interior of the restaurant was designed by architect and designer David Rockwell.

Fiorella's Jack Stack Barbecue was the second restaurant to open in the Freight House. It opened its third location at the west end of the building in Fall 2000, and it continues to occupy that location.

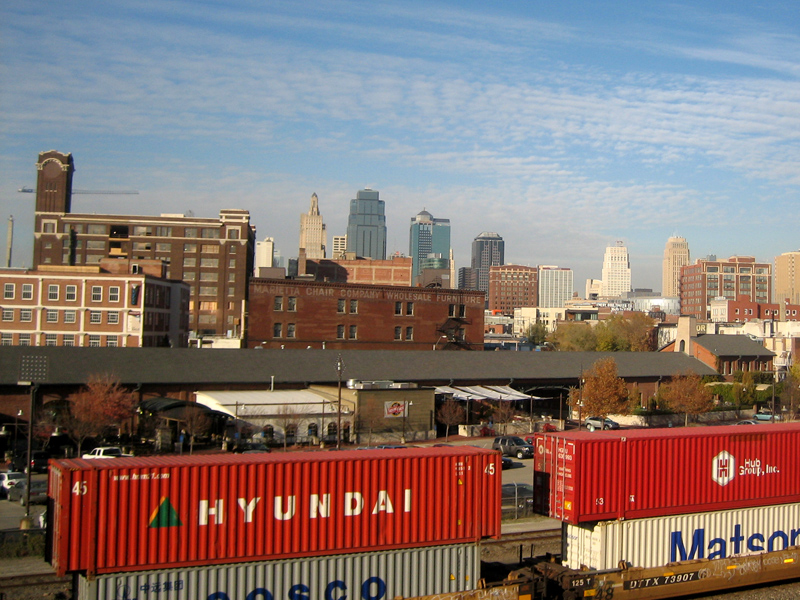
Freight and passenger trains continue to pass just south of the 500-foot (150 m) long Freight House. Lidia's occupies the far right portion of the structure including the two-story area, Grunauer is located in the middle of the building, and Fiorella's Jack Stack Barbecue is at the west end.

City Tavern opened in 2002 in the middle of the three Freight House restaurant spaces, and enjoyed success over the years until it closed in April 2010. Following the closing of City Tavern, acclaimed Austrian-born chef Peter Grunauer opened a Viennese restaurant in May 2010 in the space formerly occupied by City Tavern. The restaurant, known as Grunauer, is operated by Peter, his daughter Elisabeth, and his son Nicholas. Other relatives of the Grunauer family also operate a restaurant of the same name in the artsy Neubau district of Vienna, Austria
