= Timeline of St. Louis =

The following is a timeline of the history of the city of St. Louis, Missouri, United States.

== Prior to 19th-century ==
- 1764 – St. Louis founded by Pierre Laclède in Louisiana, New Spain.
- 1767 - It was "a log-cabin village of perhaps 500 inhabitants".
- 1770 - Spanish in power.
- 1780 – "Indian attack."
- 1785 - Floods.
- 1799 – Population: 925.

== 19th century ==
=== 1800s–1850s ===
- 1800 – St. Louis becomes part of French Louisiana.
- 1804
  - St. Louis becomes part of U.S. territory per Louisiana Purchase.
  - Post Office established.
- 1805 – St. Louis becomes capital of the U.S. Louisiana Territory.
- 1808 – Missouri Gazette newspaper begins publication.
- 1809
  - Town incorporated.
  - Missouri Fur Company established.
  - First drug store opens.
- 1811 – December 16: New Madrid earthquakes continued into 1812.
- 1812 – St. Louis County established.
- 1815 – Theatre opens.
- 1816 – Bank of St. Louis incorporated.
- 1818
  - Saint Louis Academy (became Saint Louis University) founded.
  - Baptist Church built.
- 1819 – Erin Benevolent Society founded.
- 1820
  - June: Missouri constitutional convention held.
  - September: Missouri General Assembly convenes.
- 1821
  - St. Louis becomes part of the new U.S. state of Missouri.
  - City Directory begins publication.
- 1822
  - City of St. Louis incorporated.
  - Area of city: 385 acres.
- 1823 – William Carr Lane becomes mayor.
- 1825 – Lafayette visits town.
- 1826 – Catholic Diocese of St. Louis established.
- 1828 – County Courthouse built.
- 1830 – Population: 4,977.
- 1832 - Cholera.
- 1834
  - Daily Evening Herald newspaper begins publication.
  - Cathedral of St. Louis consecrated.
- 1835 – Anzeiger des Westens German-language newspaper begins publication.
- 1836 – Chamber of Commerce established.
- 1837 – Daniel Webster visits city.
- 1840
  - City boundaries expanded.
  - Population: 16,469.
- 1841
  - United Hebrew Congregation founded.
  - Area of city: 4.5 square miles.
- 1844
  - Anti-immigration unrest.
  - Floods.
- 1846
  - Dred Scott files lawsuit.
  - Mercantile Library Association established.
- 1847 – Boatmen's Savings Institution chartered.
- 1849
  - Concordia Seminary relocates to St. Louis.
  - Cholera epidemic.
  - Fire.
  - Bellefontaine Cemetery established.
- 1850
  - Third Baptist Church established.
  - Population: 77,860.
- 1851 – Bates' Theatre opens.
- 1852
  - Iron Mountain railroad built.
  - Bavarian Brewery in business.
  - Grand Opera House opens under the name Varieties Theatre
- 1853 – Washington University founded.
- 1854 – Czech Slavonic Benevolent Society founded.
- 1856
  - Academy of Science founded.
  - St. Louis Agricultural and Mechanical Fair begins.
- 1857
  - For the next quarter century, the city was "the centre of an idealistic philosophical movement".
  - St. Louis Fire Department established.
  - Lindell Hotel in business.
  - Dred Scott decision in March, 1857.
  - Westliche Post (German language newspaper) established. (closed 1938)
- 1859
  - Horse-drawn streetcars begin operating .
  - Mary Institute founded.
  - Synagogue consecrated on Sixth Street.
  - Missouri Botanical Garden founded.

=== 1860s–1890s ===
- 1860 – Population: 160,773.
- 1861 – Western Sanitary Commission and Ladies Union Aid Society established.
- 1862 – Hoelke and Benecke photo studio in business.
- 1865
  - Sokol sport club, and Germania Association established.
  - St. Louis Public Library established.
  - Southern Hotel and Meyer & Brother drug store in business.
- 1866
  - Cholera epidemic.
  - Missouri Historical Society headquartered in city.
  - Olympic Theatre opens.
- 1867 – City Board of Health and Compton Hill Reservoir Park established.
- 1869 – Congregation Shaare Emeth founded.
- 1870
  - Carondelet becomes part of St. Louis.
  - Area of city: 17.98 square miles.
  - Population: 310,864.
- 1871
  - 1871 St. Louis tornado.
  - Puck German-language magazine begins publication.
- 1872
  - Maryville College of the Sacred Heart and University Club founded.
  - Catholic Amerika begins publication.
  - Smallpox outbreak.
- 1873 – Laclede Gas Light Company in business.
- 1874 – Eads Bridge opened.
- 1875
  - Merchants Exchange opens.
  - Brownell and Wight Car Company in business.
- 1876
  - June: City hosts 1876 Democratic National Convention.
  - Forest Park opens.
  - Busch's Budweiser beer introduced.
  - Area of city: 61.37 square miles.
- 1877
  - City secedes from St. Louis County.
  - July: 1877 St. Louis general strike.
- 1878 – St. Louis Post-Dispatch newspaper begins publication.
- 1879
  - Anheuser-Busch Brewing Association and J.C. Strauss photo studio in business.
  - St. Louis Children's Hospital opened.
  - St. Louis School of Fine Arts opened.
  - Pope's Theatre opens.
- 1880
  - St. Stanislaus Kostka Church built.
  - Population: 350,518.
- 1882 – Mallinckrodt Chemical Works incorporated.
- 1883 – St. Louis Exposition and Music Hall opens.
- 1884 – St. Louis Maroons baseball team active.
- 1886
  - May 1: Labour strike.
  - St. Louis Watchmaking School and Congregation Temple Israel founded.
- 1888 – City hosts 1888 Democratic National Convention.
- 1889
  - Missouri Botanical Garden established.
  - Tower Grove Park established.
  - Merchants Bridge opened.
- 1890
  - Portland and Westmoreland Places begin to develop.
  - Population: 451,770.
- 1891
  - Rubicam Business School established.
  - Wainwright Building constructed.
  - Washington University School of Medicine opened.
  - American Car Company in business.
  - Air conditioning installed in the Ice Palace beerhall.
- 1892
  - St. Louis Browns baseball team active.
  - St. Louis Country Club established.
  - Stix Baer & Fuller (shop) in business.
  - National People's Party founded in St. Louis.
- 1894 – Union Station opens.
- 1896
  - May: 1896 St. Louis–East St. Louis tornado.
  - June: Flood.
  - City hosts 1896 Republican National Convention.
  - Busch's Michelob beer introduced.
- 1898 – Compton Hill Water Tower erected.

== 20th-century ==
=== 1900s–1970s ===
- 1900
  - 1900 St. Louis streetcar strike.
  - Monsanto Chemical Works in business.
  - Population: 575,238.
- 1902 – Sportsman's Park opens.
- 1903 – Missouri Athletic Club founded.
- 1904
  - Buckingham Hotel built.
  - Inside Inn an hotel built of wood.
  - April: St. Louis World's Fair opens;
  - Saint Louis Art Museum built.
  - City hosts 1904 Summer Olympics and 1904 Democratic National Convention.
  - Louisiana Purchase Exposition held.
- 1905
  - May Department Store relocates to St. Louis.
  - Shaare Zedek Synagogue founded.
- 1906
  - Racquet Club of St. Louis founded.
  - Statue of Louis IX of France unveiled in Forest Park.
- 1908
  - Aero Club of St. Louis incorporated.
  - Aeronautic Supply Company in business.
  - St. Louis Coliseum re-built.
  - Fairground Park established.
- 1909 – October: City centennial.
- 1910 – Population: 687,029.
- 1911
  - Urban League branch established.
  - Famous-Barr (shop) in business.
  - Benoist Flying School established.
- 1912
  - Ethical Society building constructed.
  - St. Louis Argus newspaper begins publication.
  - Missouri Peace Society founded.
- 1913 – Henry Kiel becomes mayor.
- 1914
  - Federal Reserve Bank of St. Louis begins operating.
  - National Association for the Advancement of Colored People branch established.
  - Railway Exchange Building constructed.
  - "Pageant and Masque of Saint Louis" held.
  - St. Louis Zoo incorporated.
  - Barnes Hospital opened.
  - New charter adopted reducong the elective officers to terms of four years.
  - Cathedral Basilica of Saint Louis completed.
- 1915 – Junior League of St. Louis organized.
- 1917
  - MacArthur Bridge opens.
  - St. Louis Municipal Opera Theatre (The Muny) opens
- 1918
  - Poro beauty school opens.
- 1919
  - League of Women Voters of St. Louis organized.
  - City Hospital No. 2 begins operating.
  - Pine Street YMCA opens.
- 1920
  - Chase Hotel built.
  - Population: 772,897.
- 1921
  - WEW radio begins broadcasting.
  - American Association of University Women chapter active.
- 1925 – St. Louis Theater opens.
- 1926
  - Southwestern Bell Building constructed.
  - New Masonic Temple built.
- 1927
  - Racquet Club of St. Louis funds Lindbergh's Spirit of St. Louis airplane.
  - Tornado.
  - B.F. Mahoney Aircraft Corporation in business.
- 1928 – St. Louis American newspaper begins publication.
- 1929
  - Fox Theatre opens.
  - St. Louis Arena opened.
- 1930 – Lambert-St. Louis Municipal Airport dedicated.
- 1931 – Rombauer's Joy of Cooking published.
- 1933
  - Firmin Desloge Hospital opens.
  - Anheuser-Busch's Budweiser Clydesdales established.
- 1935 – Neighborhood Gardens (housing) opens.
- 1937 – Floral Conservatory built in Forest Park.
- 1939
  - 1939 St. Louis smog.
  - Oldani's restaurant in business.
- 1940 – Population: 816,048.
- 1942 – George Hudson Orchestra debuts.
- 1943 – Campbell House Museum opens.
- 1947 – Congress of Racial Equality chapter organized.
- 1948 – U.S. Supreme Court decides Shelley v. Kraemer lawsuit.
- 1949 – Fairground Park riot.
- 1950 – Population: 856,796.
- 1951 – Veterans' Memorial Bridge built.
- 1954
  - KETC television begins broadcasting.
  - Pruitt–Igoe housing built.
- 1955
  - Peabody Coal Company relocates to St. Louis.
  - Hellmuth, Obata and Kassabaum architects in business.
- 1958 – Landmarks Association of St. Louis established.
- 1959
  - Wintertime tornado
  - St. Louis sit-in during the Civil Rights Movement.
- 1960
  - Population: 750,026.
  - Sister city relationship established with Stuttgart, Germany.
  - The National Football League's Chicago Cardinals relocate to St. Louis. They will remain through 1987.
- 1962 – St. Louis Community College established.
- 1963
  - University of Missouri–St. Louis established.
  - MetroBus begins operating.
  - Planetarium opens.
- 1964
  - LaClede Town (housing) opens.
  - Imo's Pizza in business in Shaw.
  - Cardinals win the World Series, defeating New York Yankees in seven games
- 1965
  - Gateway Arch erected.
  - Regional East-West Gateway Council of Governments established.
- 1966 – Busch Stadium opens.
- 1967
  - Poplar Street Bridge completed.
  - St. Louis Blues - National Hockey League - NHL Expansion ice hockey team formed.
  - K-SHE 95 (94.7) FM radio station begins broadcasting its current Rock n' Roll format.
  - Cardinals win the World Series, defeating Boston Red Sox in seven games
- 1969 – Laclede Gas Building constructed.
- 1970
  - Student antiwar demonstration.
  - Population: 622,236.
- 1972 - Demolition of Pruitt-Igoe begins and will last four years.
- 1974
  - St. Louis Port Authority created.
  - Sister city relationship established with Suwa, Japan.
- 1976 – Sister city relationship established with Lyon, France.
- 1977
  - St. Louis Convention Center opens.
  - James F. Conway becomes mayor.
  - Sister city relationship established with Galway, Ireland.
- 1979 – Sister city relationship established with Nanjing, China.

=== 1980s–1990s ===
- 1980 - Contemporary Art Museum St. Louis established.
- 1981 – Gwen B. Giles is the first woman and first African-American appointed to lead the St. Louis City Assessor's Office.
- 1982 - Cardinals win World Series, defeating Milwaukee Brewers in seven games
- 1986
  - Express Scripts and Galleria Cinema in business.
  - Southwestern Bell Telephone Building constructed.
- 1987
  - Sister city relationship established with Bologna, Italy.
  - Lindbergh Plaza cinema in business.
  - Football Cardinals play final season in St. Louis before relocating to Arizona
- 1989 – One Metropolitan Square (hi-rise) built.
- 1990
  - Population: 396,685.
  - Sister city relationship established with Georgetown, Guyana.
- 1991 - Hindu Temple of St. Louis founded.
- 1992 – Sister city relationships established with Szczecin, Poland and Samara, Russia.
- 1993
  - Floods
  - MetroLink begins operating.
- 1994
  - Kiel Center arena opens.
  - Sister city relationship established with Saint-Louis, Senegal.
- 1995
  - St. Louis Rams football team relocates from Los Angeles..
  - Trans World Dome (stadium) opens.
- 1997
  - City website online (approximate date).
  - City Museum founded
  - Ameren Corporation in business.
  - Clarence Harmon becomes mayor.
  - St. Louis Missouri Temple inaugurated.

== 21st-century ==
- 2000 – Population: 348,189.
- 2001
  - Pulitzer Arts Foundation museum opens.
  - Francis G. Slay becomes mayor.
  - William Lacy Clay, Jr. becomes U.S. representative for Missouri's 1st congressional district.
  - Veterans for Peace headquartered in St. Louis.
- 2002 – St. Louis Building Arts Foundation active (approximate date).
- 2003 – St. Louis Area Regional Response System headquartered in city.
- 2004 – Sister city relationship established with Bogor, Indonesia.
- 2006
  - New Busch Stadium built.
  - Cardinals win World Series, defeating Detroit Tigers in five games
- 2007 – Center for Citizen Leadership headquartered in St. Louis.
- 2008 – Sister city relationship established with Brčko, Bosnia and Herzegovina.
- 2009 – Citygarden opens.
- 2010 – Population: 319,294; metro 2,812,896.
- 2011
  - October: Occupy St. Louis begins.
  - Cardinals win World Series, defeating Texas Rangers in seven games
- 2014
  - August 9: Shooting in nearby Ferguson, unrest ensues.
  - Musial Bridge and Center for Jazz open.
- 2016
  - Rams leave St. Louis and become the L.A. Rams once again.
- 2019 - Blues win Stanley Cup for the first time, defeating Boston Bruins in seven games
- 2022 - CityPark opens
- 2025 - Tornado

== See also ==
- History of St. Louis
- List of mayors of St. Louis
- National Register of Historic Places listings in St. Louis (city, A–L), Missouri
- National Register of Historic Places listings in St. Louis (city, M–Z), Missouri
- Timeline of Kansas City, Missouri

== Bibliography ==
- John A. Paxton (1821), St. Louis Directory and Register, St. Louis, OCLC 14912466, OL 24166744M
- J. Thomas Scharf (1883), History of Saint Louis City and County, Philadelphia: Louis H. Everts, OCLC 2991276, OL 7105650M
- M'Adam, David H (1886). "St Louis (2.)" . Encyclopædia Britannica. Vol. 21 (9th ed.). pp. 183–185.
- Commercial and Architectural St. Louis. Dumont Jones. 1891.
- "Chronological and Historical Events". Shewey's Guide and Directory to Saint Louis. St. Louis: Arista C. Shewey. 1892.
- Louis Public Library, St (January 1898), "Reading List: City of St. Louis", Public Library Magazine, vol. 5, St. Louis
- Helen Tutt (January 1898), "Development of St. Louis", Public Library Magazine, vol. 5, St. Louis
- "St Louis (Missouri)" . Encyclopædia Britannica. Vol. 24 (11th ed.). 1910. pp. 24–27.
- Benjamin Vincent (1910), "St. Louis", Haydn's Dictionary of Dates (25th ed.), London: Ward, Lock & Co.
- Walter Barlow Stevens (1911). St. Louis, the Fourth City, 1764-1909. S.J. Clarke.
- John J. Tannrath (1913). "Saint Louis". Catholic Encyclopedia. Vol. 13. New York: New York, The Encyclopedia Press.
- Andrew Cunningham McLaughlin and Albert Bushnell Hart, ed. (1914). "St. Louis". Cyclopedia of American Government. Vol. 3. D. Appleton and Company.
- St. Louis City Plan Commission; Harland Bartolomew (1917). Problems of St. Louis. Nixon-Jones.
- Stevens, Walter Barlow (1922). "St. Louis" . Encyclopædia Britannica. Vol. 32 (12th ed.).
- Federal Writers' Project (1941), "St. Louis", Missouri: A Guide to the 'Show Me' State, American Guide Series, New York: Duell, Sloan and Pearce
- John Francis McDermott, ed. (1952). "Chronology". Early Histories of St. Louis. Joseph Desloge Fund. Publications,2. St. Louis Historical Documents Foundation. hdl:2027/mdp.39015019373631 – via HathiTrust.
- Saint Louis: a Chronological and Documentary History, 1762–1970, by Robert Vexler. Dobbs Ferry: Oceana Publications, 1974.
- Charles Van Ravenswaay (1991). St. Louis: An Informal History of the City and Its People, 1764-1865. Missouri History Museum. ISBN 978-0-252-01915-9.
- Lorin Cuoco and William H. Gass, ed. (2000). "St. Louis Literary Chronology". Literary St. Louis: A Guide. Missouri History Museum. p. 4+. ISBN 978-1-883982-35-5.
- "Recommended Reading on St. Louis History". stl250. 2013. Archived from the original on October 11, 2014.
