= Imperial Brewing Company Brewery =

Industrial site in Kansas City, Missouri

Coordinates: 39.076840°N 94.603140°W

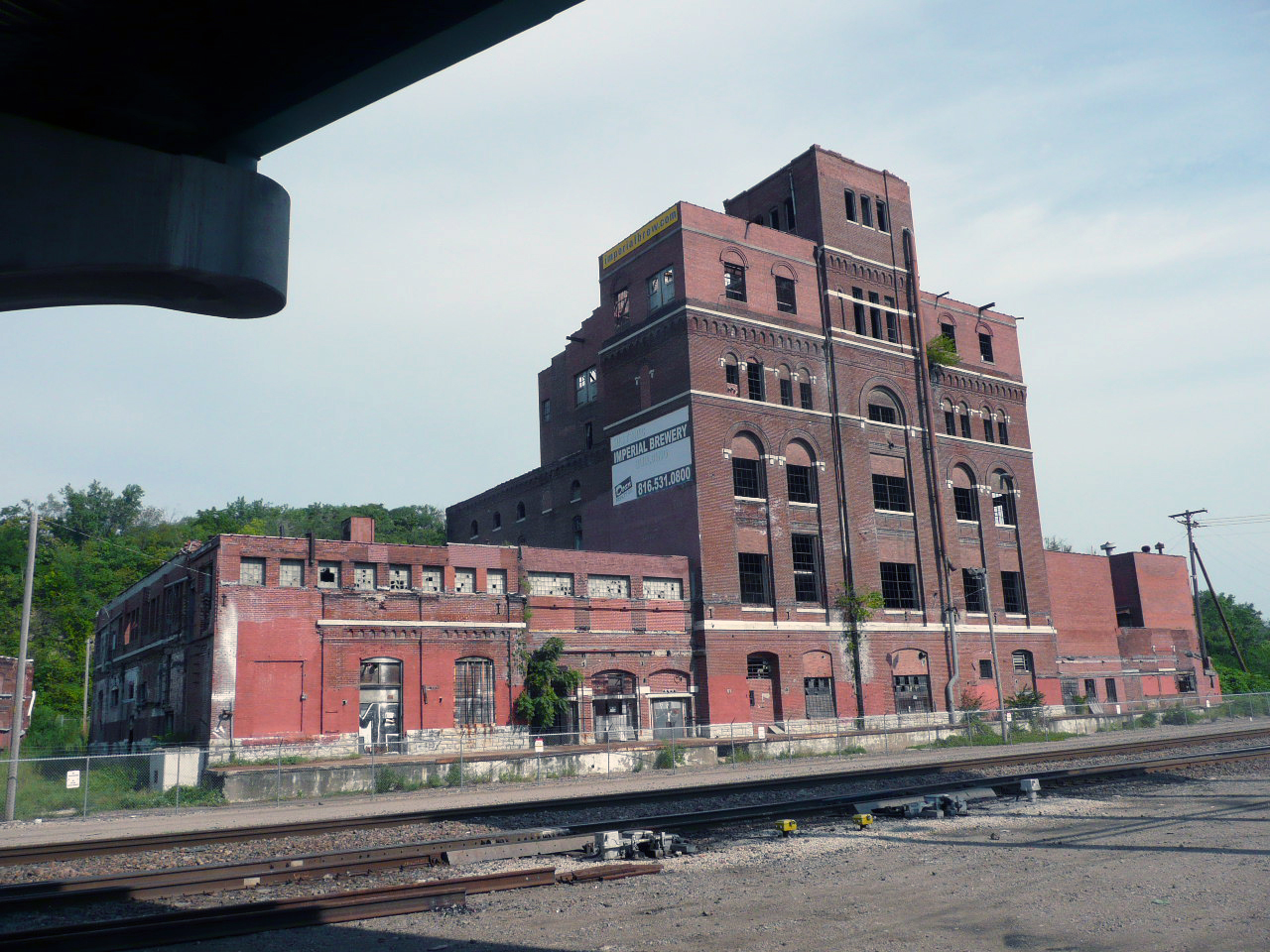
The brewery as seen from Southwest Boulevard.

The Imperial Brewing Company Brewery was an abandoned Late Victorian/Romanesque Revival-style industrial site located at 2825 Southwest Boulevard in downtown Kansas City, Missouri. Built in 1902, the surviving brewhouse and stable were part of a larger complex developed by Ludwig D. Breitag, a German immigrant and stone contractor. An icehouse and other buildings in the complex were demolished when the site was converted to a flour mill during Prohibition. From 1919 until its closure in the mid-1980s, Imperial Brewery became commonly known as the Boulevard Mill. The site was purchased in 2007 with plans to renovate. The site was added to the National Registry of Historic Places in 2011. Fires and vandalism halted the planned renovations in 2012. The Imperial Brewery Company Building was completely demolished in 2023.
