= Harold Roe Bartle =

American businessman, philanthropist, public speaker, and politician (1901–1974)

H. Roe Bartle
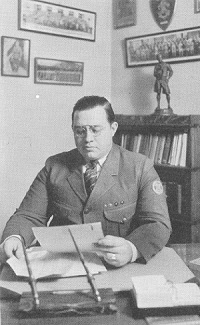
- Bartle (c. 1926)

47th Mayor of Kansas City
- In office 1955–1963
- Preceded by: William E. Kemp
- Succeeded by: Ilus W. Davis

Personal details
- Born: Harold Roe Bennett Sturdyvant Bartle; June 25, 1901 Richmond, Virginia, U.S.
- Died: May 9, 1974 (aged 72) Kansas City, Missouri, U.S.
- Resting place: Forest Hill Calvary Cemetery; Kansas City, Missouri, U.S.
- Party: Democratic
- Spouse: Margaret Ann Caroline Jarvis
- Children: 1
- Education: University of Chattanooga
- Profession: Executive, philanthropist, educator, public speaker
- Nickname: The Chief

Harold Roe Bennett Sturdyvant Bartle (June 25, 1901 – May 9, 1974), better known as H. Roe Bartle, was an American businessman, philanthropist, executive, and professional public speaker who served two terms as mayor of Kansas City, Missouri. After Bartle helped lure the Dallas Texans American Football League team to Kansas City in 1962, owner Lamar Hunt renamed the franchise the Kansas City Chiefs after Bartle's nickname, The Chief.

== Early life and education ==
Bartle was born in Richmond, Virginia, the only child of Samuel Dunn Bartle, an English immigrant and Presbyterian minister, and Ada Mae Roe, of northern Illinois. The Bartle family was musical, and at age thirteen, Harold was playing the piano and organ at his father's church. The same year, he also attempted to enlist in the army, but his father produced proof of his age and had him discharged.

Between 1916 and 1920, Bartle attended Fork Union Military Academy, where his father taught history and military science. There, Roe (as he now insisted on being called) became a championship debater. He attended the University of Chattanooga in 1920, where he proved a natural athlete, but suffered a serious bout of pneumonia. He returned to his family, now in Lebanon, Kentucky, where in 1921, he earned a law degree from Hamilton College of Law, a Chicago-based correspondence school.

== Personal life ==
Bartle met Margaret Ann Caroline Jarvis in Lebanon, and they were married on September 26, 1923, in St. Joseph, Missouri, where his father had taken another pastorate. The Bartles had one child, Margaret Roe "Jimmy" Bartle Taylor. Bartle, who was 6' 4", weighed well over 200 pounds before his marriage, and he continued to gain until at one point he may have reached 375.

== Scouting career ==
Bartle was admitted to the Kentucky bar in 1920 (before completing his correspondence degree) and worked for a Lebanon firm; he was also the Lebanon prosecuting attorney from 1920 to 1922. Nevertheless, Bartle's gifts were as an organizer and promoter, and he was unwilling to spend his life in the law. Bartle had supervised a Boy Scout troop in Lebanon, and in 1923–24, he accepted a position as the executive of the Cheyenne Council of the Boy Scouts of America in Casper, Wyoming, a responsibility that included oversight of the entire state. From 1925 until 1928, he held a similar position in St. Joseph, Missouri; and from 1928 until 1955, he was the Scout Executive at the Kansas City Area Council.

In 1925, Bartle created the Tribe of Mic-O-Say, an honor camper program, in Agency, Missouri, at Camp Brinton. (In 1935 it moved to Camp Geiger.) In 1929, he brought the Tribe of Mic-O-Say program to a Boy Scout Camp in Osceola, Missouri. Known as Camp Osceola at the time, it would later be named the H. Roe Bartle Scout Reservation in his honor. Roe's inspiration for this program dated to his Wyoming years.

Bartle's nickname, "The Chief," came from his time as a Boy Scout executive. He claimed he was inducted into a local Arapaho tribe, and used the name "Chief Lone Bear" as part of the Mic-O-Say program with the Boy Scouts.

== Business career ==
While a Scouting executive, Bartle also engaged in profitable business enterprises and made shrewd investment decisions. He also served on the board of directors of numerous corporations and banks, including the largest independent liquor dealer in Missouri. According to his daughter, when his friend, President Harry Truman, asked him to become the regional director of the Economic Stabilization Agency, Bartle had to resign from 57 boards of directors to avoid possible conflicts of interest.

As a professional public speaker, he regularly addressed political, fraternal, educational, religious, civic, business, and service organizations. (He had a rich, powerful voice, and in Nice, France, he blew out the public address system.) By the time he ran for mayor, he was making 200 speeches a year at fees that ranged upwards from $1,000 each. One service club secretary was so dazzled by Bartle's rhetoric and humor that he announced Bartle had given "one of the most dynamic speeches ever heard by man." A slightly skeptical reporter added that, nevertheless, "just what he said...was not recorded."

The money Bartle made in the private sector subsidized his public service and allowed him to fund organizations in which he took an interest. For instance, for 30 years, he donated his Boy Scout salary to the organization. There were three Bartles, he said, the Bartle "who makes money, the Bartle who gives it away, and the Bartle who works for free."

== Civic, philanthropic, and religious endeavors ==
Bartle seemed determined to participate in as many charitable organizations as possible. He accepted thirty appointments to philanthropic boards and commissions and, in time, became an executive in virtually all of them. During World War II, he served as director of American War Dads, a soldier-welfare group. After the war, from 1945 to 1952, Bartle was president of Missouri Valley College, a small coeducational school associated with the Cumberland Presbyterian Church.

In 1948, as a college President, Bartle founded and contributed $100,000 toward establishing the American Humanics Foundation, now the Nonprofit Leadership Alliance, a philanthropic organization at Missouri Valley College. Now at seventy-five colleges and universities nationwide, the program prepares students for leadership in nonprofit, public service organizations such as the Boy Scouts, Camp Fire Girls, and the YWCA.

Bartle was national president of Alpha Phi Omega service fraternity from 1931 until 1946. Alpha Phi Omega grew from 18 chapters when he took office to 109 chapters when he stepped down. It was said that Bartle personally financed the fledgling organization.

Bartle was a devout member of Central Presbyterian Church in Kansas City from 1929 until his death, although he was often not in attendance because he was filling a pulpit somewhere else. (If Bartle was called to substitute for a pastor who was ill, he needed only the time to dress and get to the church. He could work out the sermon on the way.) He was ordained in 1950 as an elder. Bartle served as a member of the general council of the Presbyterian Church from 1961 to 1968, and was a member of the General Assembly from 1962 to 1966. He was also a charter member of the National Conference of Christians and Jews.

Bartle's wife said she believed he "could do anything on this earth that he sets out to do....and he has more energy than any other five men alive." Bartle received numerous honors and awards for his public service, including honorary degrees from at least a dozen colleges and distinguished service medals from a dozen foreign governments.

== Mayor ==
In 1955, Bartle, a Democrat, with no previous political experience, was asked to run for mayor of Kansas City on the Citizens' Association ticket. Although the Citizen's Association (of which Bartle had been a founder) had helped sweep the Pendergast political machine out of power in 1940, Bartle chose to run as an independent with Citizen Association support. He was elected in April 1955. However, in his reelection campaign of 1959, Bartle also accepted the tacit support of the remnants of the Pendergast machine, leading to unfounded fears about the possible revival of "boss politics." In Kansas City, the mayor was comparatively weak, effectively an at-large city councilman; but Bartle, not surprisingly, was superb at performing the inspirational and ceremonial aspects of his office.

During his two terms, Bartle oversaw the desegregation of the city hospitals and removed them from political influence. He also overhauled the city tax structure, organized the mayors and city managers of 67 nearby towns into a planning council, supported the advancement of African-American police officers, and oversaw initial construction of the Kansas City airport and a nearby freeway. Also during his two terms, the Dallas Texans professional football team moved to Kansas City, adopting Bartle's nickname, "Chief." While he was mayor, Bartle went to all two-alarm fires in a fireman's hat, coat and boots; and every weekday morning at 8:00—or when he could actually make it to the station—he broadcast a radio report to the city.

Bartle found his first term the more enjoyable. Then he had carried into office virtually the entire Citizens Association ticket. During his second term, a block of councilmen stymied his plans. Although Bartle remained on the 1963 ticket, he asked voters not to reelect him.

== Personality ==
Bartle was a hail-fellow-well-met, who "never knew a stranger" and demonstrated an impressive recall of names. On Christmas, he would regularly spend the day visiting orphanages, the Boys' Home, the city jail, and other places that might be overlooked on such a holiday. For most of his life, Bartle lived simply, becoming more expansive in his personal spending only after being elected mayor. (His greatest extravagance until that point was fine cigars, of which he smoked 25 per day.)

Bartle idolized his clergyman father and displayed some guilt for not having followed in his profession. Bartle continued to make major decisions only after deciding what his father would have done in a similar circumstance. But Roe Bartle hated the penury of the clergyman's life. The first time he asked a girl for a date, she rejected him because he was dressed in ill-fitting, second-hand clothes. Crushed, he swore before a mirror, "hand upraised", that no child of his would ever know poverty. But once he had the money, he also acquired expensive hand-tailored suits.

Kansas City Star editor Roy A. Roberts was puzzled by Bartle, "You can say almost anything you like about Roe Bartle—call him demagogue, opportunist, tycoon or dedicated saint—and you will be correct, but you will speak only half truths. Nobody knows Bartle. He is too complex to be figured out."

== Death ==
In later years, Bartle was plagued by health problems including phlebitis and injuries to his back and legs caused by a 1944 plane crash. Bartle died on May 9, 1974, from complications of diabetes and heart disease. He was buried in Forest Hill Calvary Cemetery in Kansas City. The Kansas City Convention Center, opened in 1976, was named Bartle Hall in his honor, and Bartle's wife and friends provided items for exhibit cases there that memorialize his life. Bartle's papers are in the State Historical Society of Missouri.

== Bibliography ==
- National Cyclopedia of American Biography. Vol. 58: 213–214. 1979.
- Taylor, Jimmy Bartle (1995). Down Home with the Chief and Miss Maggie. Leathers Publishing. ISBN 0-9646898-0-4.
- Eby, David. "Lone Bear: H. Roe Bartle".
- Keith Monroe, "Kansas City's Colossal Scouter", Scouting (September 1976), 44–46, 86.
- Hartzell Spence, "The Colossal Mayor of Kansas City", Saturday Evening Post, January 28, 1956, 17–19, 79–80.
- William S. Worley, "Bartle, H. Roe", in Lawrence O. Christensen, et al., eds., Dictionary of Missouri Biography (Columbia: University of Missouri Press, 1999), 31–32.

Political offices
Preceded by William E. Kemp	Mayor of Kansas City, Missouri; 1955–1963	Succeeded by Ilus W. Davis
