= Pencoyd Railroad Bridge =

Railroad bridge in Missouri, U.S.

Freight House Pedestrian Bridge
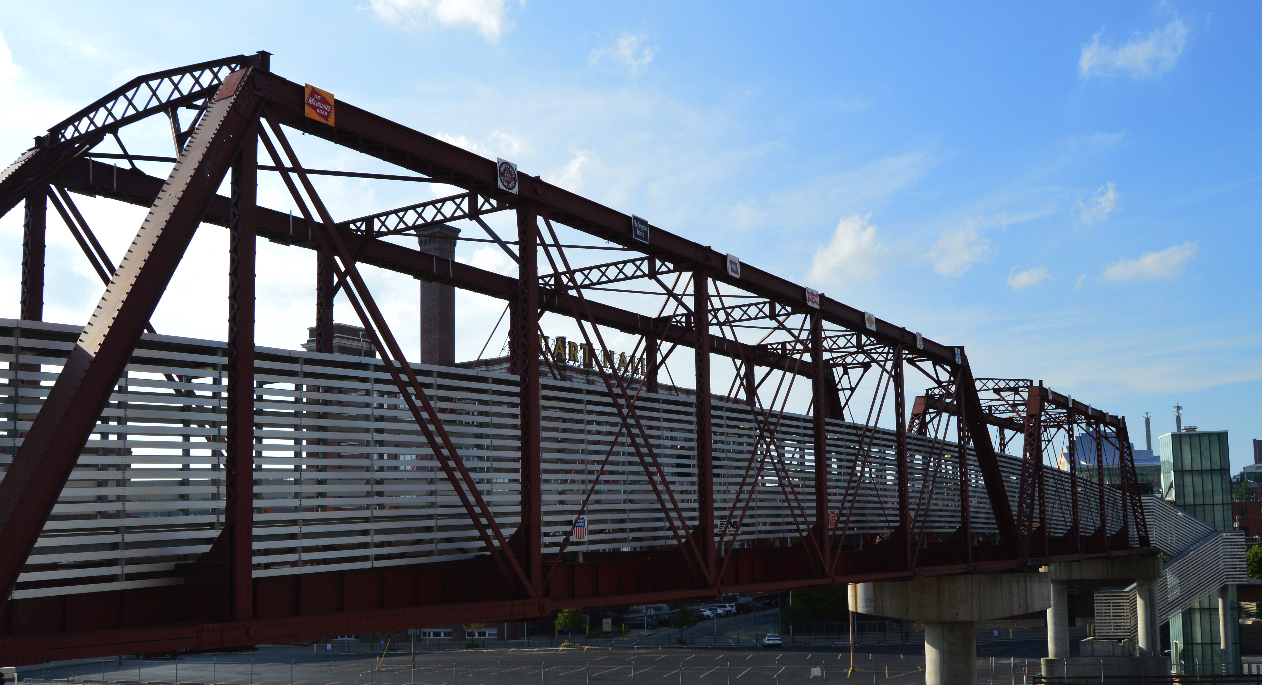
- Pencoyd Railroad Bridge
- Coordinates: 39°05′11″N 94°35′11″W
- Carries: Pedestrians
- Crosses: Union Station railroad artery

Characteristics
- Design: BNIM

History
- Opened: 2006

Location
- Interactive map of Freight House Pedestrian Bridge

The Pencoyd Railroad Bridge is a former railroad bridge in Kansas City, Missouri, that was converted into the Freight House Pedestrian Bridge and moved to its new location where it connects Union Station and the Crossroads Arts District.

== Bridge ==
The bridge was built in 1892 just south of the Hannibal Bridge as part of the Kansas City Suburban Belt Railroad, which ran from Independence, Missouri, to the Argentine District in Kansas City, Kansas. Heading west from Independence, the line reached the Kansas City Southern Railway Manifest Yard in what is now River Market, Kansas City. It crossed over the Chicago, Burlington and Quincy Railroad track coming from the Hannibal Bridge over the Missouri River in an area called The Gooseneck. It then crossed over the Missouri Pacific track and proceeded west to Kansas City, Kansas.

== Pedestrian crossing ==
In January 2006, the bridge was relocated to the Union Station in Kansas City to be a pedestrian crossing over the railroad tracks there. The bridge was originally built as a three span thru-truss, but after relocation, it was rebuilt with two spans instead of three, and adapted into what was renamed the Freight House Pedestrian Bridge.

In January 2014, it was renamed Michael R. Haverty Freight House Bridge in recognition of Mike Haverty, who had been the chair of the Union Station Kansas City Board from 2005 to 2012.
