= Nell Donnelly Reed =

American fashion designer and businesswoman (1889–1991)

- Born: Ellen Quinlan; March 6, 1889; Parsons, Kansas, United States
- Died: September 8, 1991 (aged 102); Kansas City, Missouri
- Education: Lindenwood College, St. Charles, Missouri
- Occupation: Fashion designer
- Label: Nelly Don
- Spouses: Paul J. Donnelly (1905–32; divorced); James A. Reed (1933–1944; widowed)

Nell Donnelly Reed (March 6, 1889 – September 8, 1991) was an American fashion designer and businesswoman, known for her house dresses, who founded the Nelly Don brand.

== Early life ==
Nell was born Ellen Quinlan in Parsons, Kansas, the twelfth child of an Irish immigrant railroad worker and his wife. She attended Parsons High School, and following graduation, worked as a stenographer in Kansas City where, aged 17, she married a tenant of a boarding-house adjoining her own, Paul Donnelly, who became the Credit Manager of the Barton Shoe Co. Donnelly supported her by pooling his earnings with hers to fund her studies at Lindenwood College where she was the only married student.

While the Donnellys had no children, Mr. Donnelly later adopted Nell's son, David, who was fathered in 1931 by Senator James Reed.

== Career ==
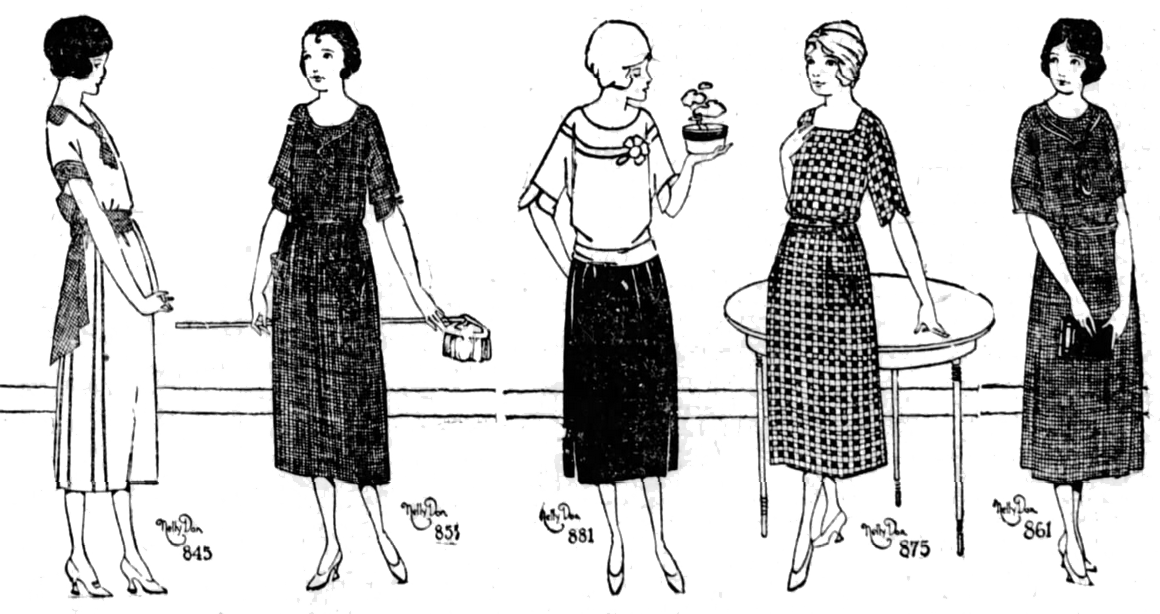
Five house dresses by Nelly Don, April 1922

Nell had always insisted on looking nicely dressed all the time, even whilst working at home, for which many women wore cheaply made, unflattering 69-cent dresses. The New York Times reported that she said she wanted to "make women look pretty when they are washing dishes." Nell's ruffled dresses and aprons in good-quality, hard-wearing fabrics were made for herself and her family, but were admired by her friends and neighbours, who asked if she would make dresses for them too. In 1916 she started working commercially, selling her first designs through a large local department store, the Gregory B. Peck Dry Goods Company in Kansas City, Missouri. The original order of 216 dresses, run up by two neighbors in the Donnelly's attic on newly purchased used sewing machines, rapidly sold out. This was despite the fact that at a dollar each, they were more expensive than the average housedresses.

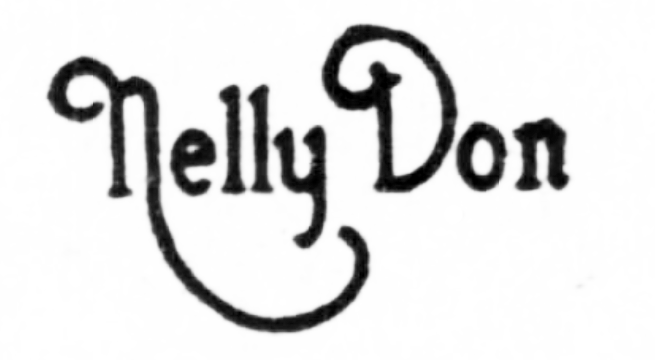
Nelly Don logo, 1921

In 1919, Nell and Paul Donnelly established the Donnelly Garment Company. The company rapidly grew through the 1920s, becoming known for its focus on good fit and durability combined with attractive designs. Each design was prototyped in every size it would be made in to ensure that the fit was correct and that purchasers would not be forced to alter them, with unsuccessful designs either reworked or not produced. As Nell was a size 16, she wanted her designs to look stylish and flattering on women of a wide range of sizes. In 1927, Nell was voted the city's most illustrious businesswoman for her success in turning Kansas City into a successful ready-to-wear production center.

The company remained successful through the Great Depression. By 1931 sales figure were at the 3.5 million dollar mark, and it had 1,000-plus employees. In 1932, Nell divorced Paul Donnelly and removed him from the company becoming its sole shareholder. Although she remarried the following year, her new husband played no part in her business. Paul Donnelly committed suicide in a sanitarium in Connecticut a couple of years later in 1934. He was posthumously diagnosed as a manic-depressive.

Nell focused on her employees' welfare, providing life insurance and medical fee support, a pension plan, an on-site cafeteria and medical care, and even funded and supported employees who wished to study evening courses at the local college. In addition to this, there was a scholarship fund for her employees' children. Despite pressure from the International Ladies' Garment Workers' Union through the 1930s and 1940s to unionize the Donnelly Garment Company, this was resisted by her employees and the company did not join the ILGWU until 1968. By 1953 the Donnelly Garment Company was the largest manufacturer of women's clothing worldwide, having expanded from housedresses to making a wider range of garments.

She retired from the company in 1956, after which it rebranded itself as Nelly Don Inc and went public in 1958. It was bankrupted by a subsequent owner with no relation to her family in 1978.

== Abduction ==
On December 16, 1931, Nell was abducted along with George Blair, her chauffeur, by three men and held for $75,000 ransom. The men reportedly hijacked her car at gunpoint, driving them to a cottage in Bonner Springs, Kansas, where she and Blair were held captive for 34 hours. The kidnappers mailed a ransom demand to Paul Donnelly which arrived the following morning, and also phoned the house of the Donnellys' lawyer, James E. Taylor, to tell him where Nell's car had been abandoned, which Taylor's wife dismissed as a hoax call. After Paul's receipt of the letter, he contacted the Taylors and it was realized that it was not a prank. Taylor called in his law partner, James A. Reed, who in addition to being a well-known attorney and politician was a neighbor of the Donnellys. Reed immediately came back to Kansas City from the state capital where he was appearing before the State Legislature, to involve himself in the search for Nell Donnelly.

Due to the fact that her abduction was announced on the Legislative Floor, the search for Nell Donnelly became an immediate media sensation, with Reed's involvement attracting a great deal of media attention. Reed was alleged to have called upon John Lazia, a major figure in the Kansas city organized crime scene, for assistance with tracing Nell. Lazia was said to have informed the chief of police, Lewis Siegfried, that no Kansas City gangster would have thought of kidnapping Nell Donnelly due to her friendship with Reed, her standing in the community, and her politics. It was also reported that, without protest from the police, Lazia sent out known criminals and gangsters on search parties for the missing woman. One news article at the time was titled "How Gangsters Solved the Donnelly Kidnapping". Nell Donnelly told police that she and Blair had been rescued by a group of armed men who stormed the secluded house in which she was held, and driven to the outskirts of a town. Following a telephone call, the police found the two abductees safe and surrounded by people in a candy shop.

The court case led to the acquittal of Paul Scheidt, who admitted to having carried out the kidnapping but claimed to have believed he was abducting an oilman's wealthy wife in order to extort money from her, and that once he realized the truth, he released his captives. The County Prosecutor, James R. Page, later told The Kansas City Star it was "the greatest miscarriage of justice since I have been in office. When a man can come in court and admit he is guilty of kidnapping and a jury turns him loose, it appears as if law-abiding people haven't any protection against the criminal element." However, three other kidnappers, Martin Depew, Walter Werner, and Charles Mele, were convicted of the crime, with Depew and Werner imprisoned for life and Mele given a 35-year sentence. Depew and Warner insisted that Scheidt had known all along exactly what he was doing. Mele protested his innocence and claimed not to know anyone involved in the case despite having been identified by Nell as one of her abductors. After the Mele trial, Nell and Reed thanked the jurors personally to assure them that they had not been mistaken in their verdict.

Nearly two years after the kidnapping, on December 13, 1933, Nell (who had divorced the previous year) unexpectedly married James A. Reed, whose wife Lura had died the previous year.

== Later life and death ==
Following her retirement, Nell was closely involved in many local organizations. She donated land in Jackson County, Missouri, to the Missouri Department of Conservation in the name of her second husband, which is now known as the James A. Reed Memorial Wildlife Area and served on the Kansas City School Board in the 1960s. She died, aged 102, on September 8, 1991, and was survived by her son and four grandchildren.
