= Fiorella's Jack Stack Barbecue =

Small chain of barbecue restaurants

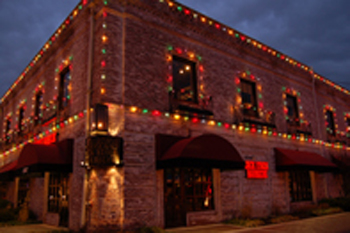
- Fiorella's Jack Stack Barbecue on the Country Club Plaza
- Interactive map of Fiorella's Jack Stack Barbecue

Restaurant information
- Established: 1974; 52 years ago
- Food type: Kansas City–style barbecue
- Location: 13441 Holmes Road, Kansas City, Missouri, 64145, United States
- Coordinates: 38.8828014°N 94.5887668°W
- Other locations: Freight House, Country Club Plaza, Lee's Summit, Overland Park, Lenexa
- Website: Official website

Fiorella's Jack Stack Barbecue is a small chain of barbecue restaurants, catering, private dining facilities, and nationwide shipper of barbecue located in the metropolitan area of Kansas City, Missouri.

== Early history ==
Fiorella's Jack Stack Barbecue was originally a part of the Fiorella family-owned chain of Smoke Stack Barbecue restaurants, with the original restaurant located on Prospect Avenue in south Kansas City, Missouri. Founded by family patriarch Russ Fiorella in 1957, it eventually opened four more restaurants for the Fiorella family. One of these, Smoke Stack Barbecue of Martin City, was opened in 1974 by the eldest son, Jack Fiorella and his wife, Delores. The restaurant briefly changed its name to Hatfield and McCoy's in the mid-1980s.

== Expansion and name change ==
In the mid-1990s, Jack and Delores opened their second restaurant location by expanding into neighboring Overland Park, Kansas. They decided to change their name to Fiorella's Jack Stack Barbecue to set themselves apart from the family chain of Smoke Stack Barbecue restaurants. They also opened a full-service catering operation in Martin City, along with private dining facilities in both Martin City and their third restaurant in the historic Freight House building across from Union Station in mid-town Kansas City. In October 2006, they opened a fourth restaurant on The Country Club Plaza. A fifth location opened in Lee's Summit, Missouri early spring 2015.

Seizing upon the opportunity to expand their Kansas City-style barbecue beyond the borders of Kansas City, Fiorella's Jack Stack Barbecue began shipping their barbecue nationwide in 2000. Media exposure on The Food Network and Modern Marvels on The History Channel helped to introduce the rest of America to Jack Stack's Kansas City-style barbecue. Fiorella's Jack Stack has been rated as one of the best barbecues in the United States by several national organizations and magazines. The Zagat Survey named it the "#1 Barbecue House in the Country."

Jack Fiorella has passed restaurant operations along to his son-in-law, Case Dorman.

== See also ==
- List of barbecue restaurants
