= William E. Kemp =

Mayor of Kansas City (1946-1955)

46th Mayor of Kansas City
- In office 1946–1955
- Preceded by: John B. Gage
- Succeeded by: H. Roe Bartle

26th President of the National League of Cities
- In office 1954
- Preceded by: William B. Hartsfield
- Succeeded by: Allen C. Thompson

Personal details
- Born: William Ewing Kemp; February 8, 1889 La Monte, Missouri, United States
- Died: July 29, 1968 (aged 79)
- Party: Democratic
- Education: Washington University in St. Louis

William Ewing Kemp (February 8, 1889 – July 29, 1968) was the mayor of Kansas City, Missouri, from 1946 to 1955.

== Biography ==
Kemp was born on February 8, 1889, in La Monte, Missouri, and received his undergraduate degree from Central Missouri State University. He was a law graduate of Washington University School of Law in 1917 and a veteran of World War I.

In 1940, Kemp was appointed by mayor Joe Gage to be city counsel and prosecuted several city employees in the fall of the Thomas Pendergast machine. He was elected to a two-year term in 1946, re-elected to a three-year term in 1949 and then again re-elected to a four-year term in 1952.

In 1954, Kemp served as the president of the National League of Cities.

During his tenure the Chouteau Bridge and Paseo Bridge were built across the Missouri River and the Starlight Theatre opened.

Political offices
Preceded by John B. Gage	Mayors of Kansas City, Missouri; 1946—1955	Succeeded by Harold Roe Bartle
