= Red Bridge, Kansas City =

Neighborhood of Kansas City, Missouri, U.S.

Coordinates: 38°55′33″N 94°35′00″W

Map of the Red Bridge neighborhood, which is indicated by the tan shaded area on the map

Red Bridge is a neighborhood in South Kansas City, Missouri. It is centered on the intersection of Red Bridge Road and Holmes Road, on the south side of I-435. Avila University, Minor Park, and the Mount Moriah Cemetery are all located within the Red Bridge neighborhood.

== History ==
A post office called Red Bridge was established in 1888, the name was changed to Redbridge in 1895, and the post office closed in 1902. The community was named for a red bridge near the original town site.

== Education ==
Red Bridge has a public library, a branch of the Mid-Continent Public Library.
