= Fire Department Headquarters; Fire Station No. 2 =

- U.S. National Register of Historic Places
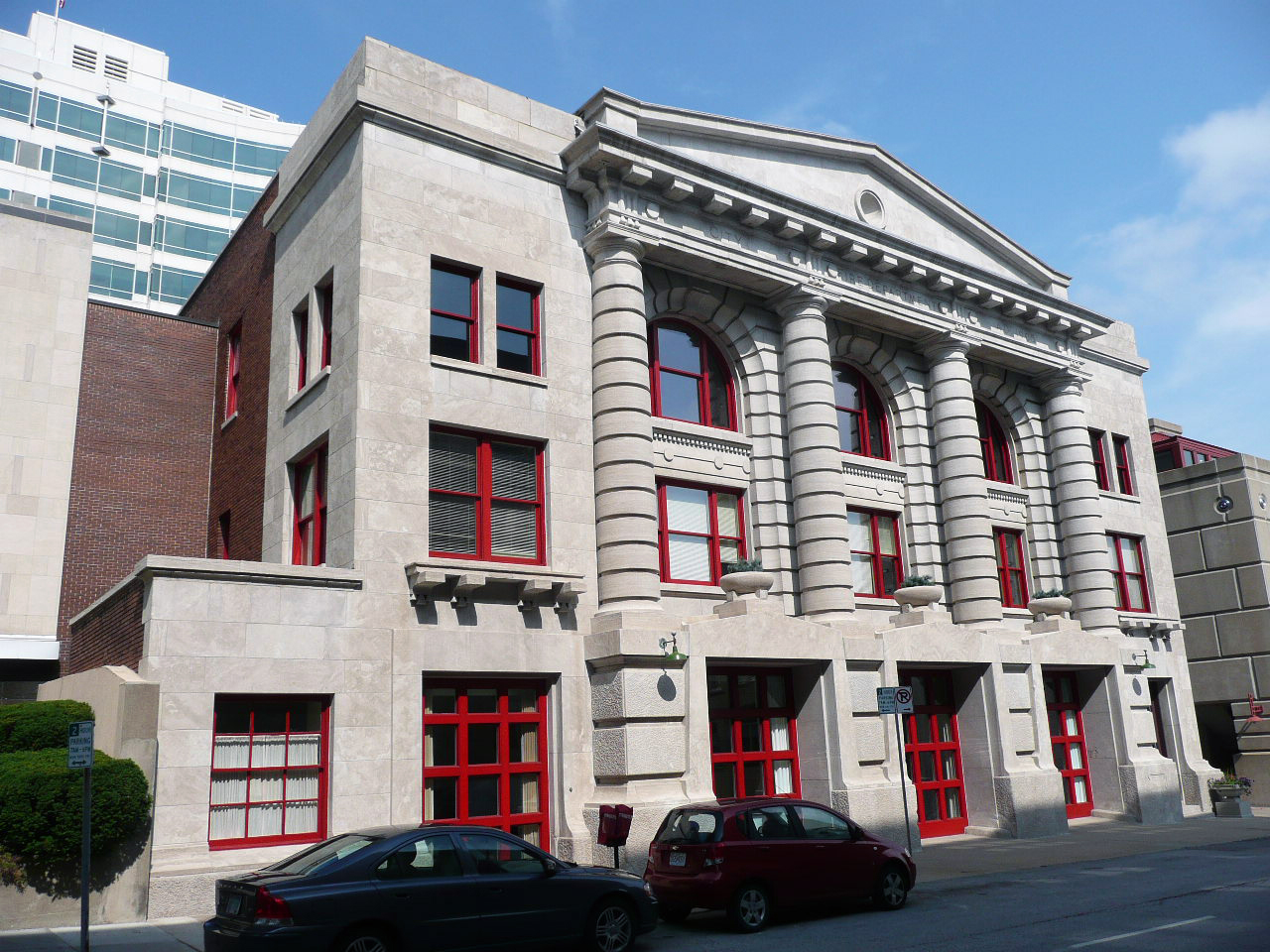

- Location within Missouri Location within the United States
- Location: 1020 Central Ave., Kansas City, Missouri
- Coordinates: 39°06′05″N 94°35′14″W
- Area: less than one acre
- Built: 1905-06
- Architect: Turney, Albert
- Architectural style: Beaux Arts
- NRHP reference No.: 82003144
- Added to NRHP: September 2, 1982

Fire Department Headquarters; Fire Station #2, at 1020 Central Ave. in Kansas City, Missouri, was built in 1905–06. It was listed on the National Register of Historic Places in 1982.

It was designed by architect Albert Turney in Beaux Arts style.
