= Ilus W. Davis =

Mayor of Kansas City (1963-1971)

48th Mayor of Kansas City
- In office April 10, 1963 – April 10, 1971
- Preceded by: H. Roe Bartle
- Succeeded by: Charles Wheeler

Personal details
- Born: Ilus Winfield Davis; April 22, 1917 Kansas City, Missouri
- Died: September 4, 1996 (aged 79)
- Party: Democratic
- Spouse: Beatrice Buecking Davis (m. 1946)
- Children: 2
- Nickname: Ike Davis

Ilus Winfield Davis (April 22, 1917 – September 4, 1996) was mayor of Kansas City, Missouri, from 1963 to 1971.

== Biography ==
"Ike" Davis was born on April 22, 1917, in Kansas City, Missouri. He grew up on the east side of the city and in 1933 was in the freshman class of the University of Kansas City, which was to become the University of Missouri-Kansas City. He was instrumental in founding the student newspaper the University News. He was to get a law degree from the University of Missouri in Columbia, Missouri, and served in the Army during World War II.

Davis was elected as the mayor of Kansas City in 1963 by 1,810 votes in nearly 110,000 cast. He oversaw the bond issue to build Kansas City International Airport and pushed for construction of the Truman Sports Complex for the Kansas City Chiefs and eventually the Kansas City Royals. He later dealt with labor strife during the construction of the two projects.

Davis found himself at the center of events leading to the 1968 Kansas City Riot, five days after the assassination of Martin Luther King Jr. Kansas City did not experience the immediate breakout of riots seen in other cities. On April 9, when the city did not close schools for King's funeral, a large group of inner city students started marching towards Kansas City City Hall. Davis went to the marchers, joining several leaders from the Black community in talking with the group, then joined the others to lead the march the remaining distance to City Hall. The crowd grew in size, slowly becoming more militant, more so when it arrived at City Hall to find a large contingent of KCPD officers. As tensions rose, with verbal and physical actions escalating on both sides, a volley of tear gas into the crowd would be the final moment when the full riot became inevitable. The students dispersed, but word of this spread through the city, a riot erupted, and five people would be killed by the time it finished.

Political offices
Preceded by Harold Roe Bartle	Mayors of Kansas City, Missouri; 1963—1971	Succeeded by Charles Wheeler
