= Harry Wiggins =

American politician

Member of the Missouri Senate from the 10th district
- In office 1975–2003

Personal details
- Born: August 1, 1932 Kansas City, Missouri
- Died: July 31, 2004 (aged 71) Kansas City, Missouri
- Party: Democratic
- Education: Rockhurst College; Saint Louis University
- Occupation: Politician, lawyer

Harry Wiggins (August 1, 1932 – July 31, 2004) was an American politician who served in the Missouri Senate. He served in the U.S. Army between 1957 and 1959. On August 18, 1961, he was appointed Assistant United States Attorney for the Western District of Missouri by Attorney General Robert F. Kennedy, serving until April 1, 1967.

In 1972, Wiggins served as Missouri state coordinator for George McGovern. He served as Kansas City's first senate majority floor leader from 1980 until 1984. In 2000, the Kansas City Royals gave him the annual award of Mr. Baseball of Kansas City. He died July 31, 2004, of stomach cancer. The lifelong bachelor had lived his entire life in Kansas City.

He was a graduate of Rockhurst College, where he was a member of Zeta Chapter of Alpha Delta Gamma National Fraternity.
