= Harris-Kearney House =

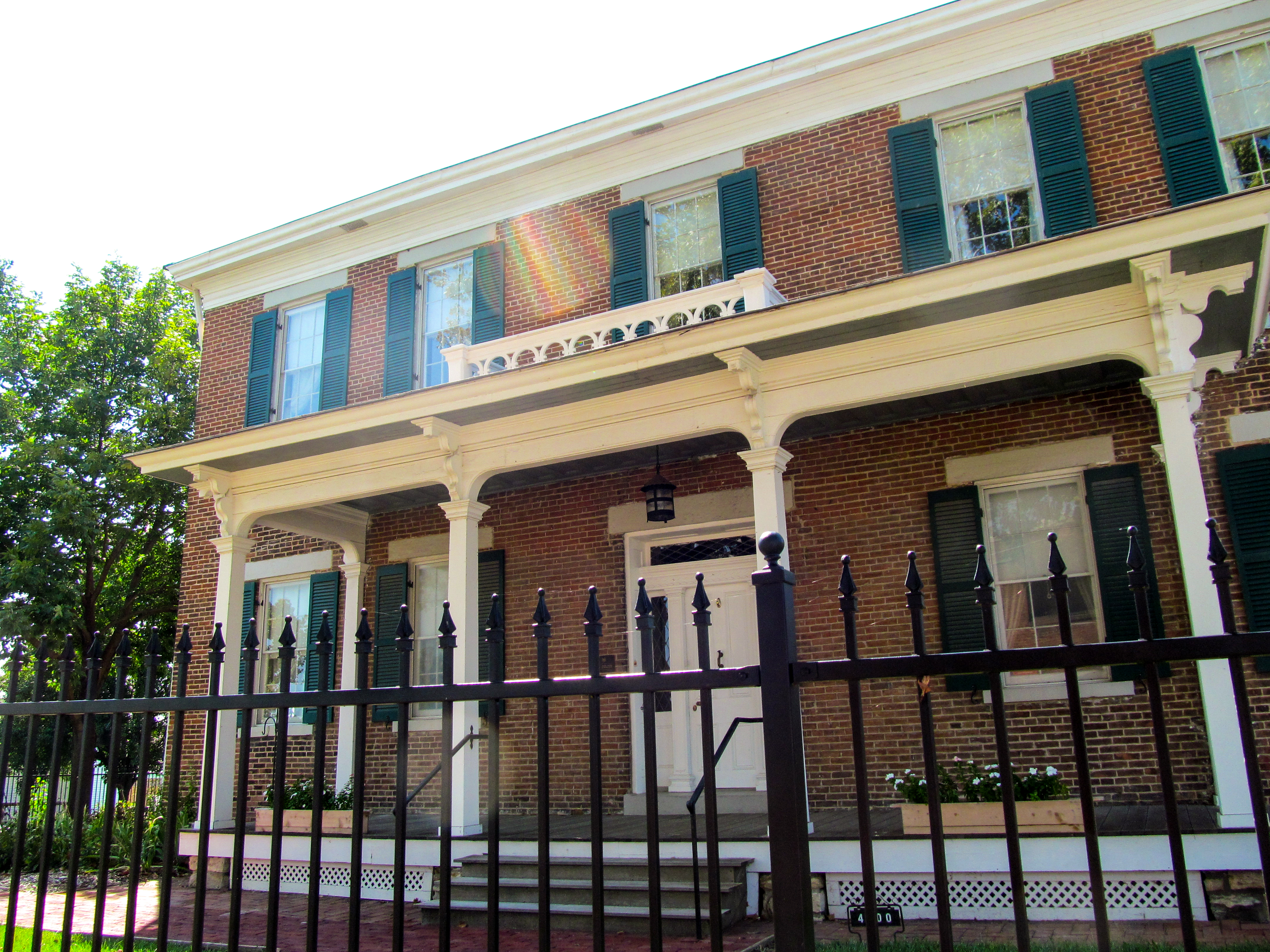
- Col. John Harris House
- Established: 1963
- Location: 4000 Baltimore Ave, Kansas City, Missouri, United States
- Coordinates: 39°03′15″N 94°35′16″W
- Website: Harris-Kearney House

The 1855 Harris-Kearney House is an historical site located in Kansas City, Missouri, in the Westport neighborhood. Originally, the house was located at the intersection of modern-day Westport Road and Main Street (where the Katz Drug Store was located) The home is the oldest brick residence in the city.

This Greek Revival mansion was built in 1855, and was owned by Col. John "Jack" Harris and his wife Henrietta. The Mansion House, as it was known, was moved to 4000 Baltimore, in 1922.

== Harris House Hotel ==
In 1846 the Harris family purchased a business called the Catfish House located at the northeast corner of what is today's Westport Road and Pennsylvania. The family operated this small hotel and saloon until it burned to the ground in 1848. With the help of friends, family and locals, the hotel was rebuilt as a 3-story brick hotel, in the same location, and renamed The Harris House Hotel. This new, grand hotel was considered integral to the neighborhood as it provided food and lodging to explorers, trappers, Union soldiers, gold miners, salesmen, politicians, and pioneers traveling west on the Santa Fe, California, and Oregon Trails. During the Battle of Westport, in 1864, the hotel was used as the headquarters of the Union Army with General Curtis in command. The Harris House Hotel was torn down in 1922.

The Harris family lived in the Mansion House from 1855 to 1881.

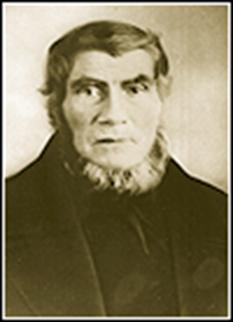
Col. John "Jack" Harris (1795-1873). Original owner of Col. John Harris House, 4000 Baltimore Ave. Westport

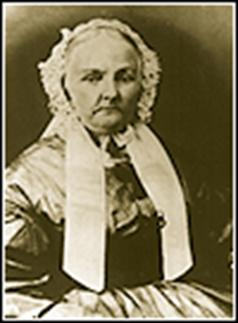
Henrietta Harris. Wife of Col. John Harris, original owner of the house, 4000 Baltimore Ave. Westport

The Kearney Family lived in the Mansion House from 1870 to 1898.

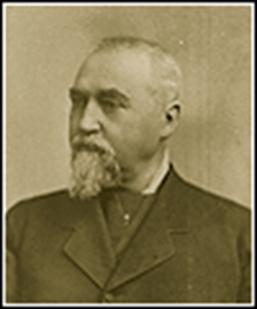
Col. Charles Kearney. Col. Harris' son-in-law and second owner of Col. John Harris home, 4000 Baltimore Ave. Westport

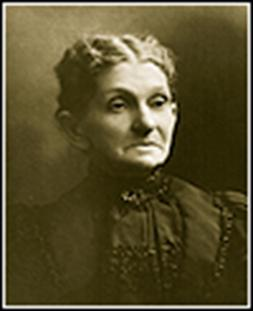
Josephine (Harris) Kearney. Daughter of Col. John & Henrietta Harris, wife of Col. Kearney. Second owner of the house, 4000 Baltimore Ave. Westport

The Kearney's moved into the Harris House in 1870. They added on to the back of the home to accommodate their family of three daughters, one adopted daughter, and one son. In 1898, William Rockhill Nelson, founder of The Kansas City Star, bought the property and gave it to Mr. and Mrs. Thomas W. Johnston, editor of The KC Star, as a wedding gift.

In 1921, Elmer Williams, a businessman, bought the Mansion House and wanted to demolish it and build a hotel. To prevent the demolition, in 1922, the home was purchased for $1,000, by a group of ladies who were forerunners of the Daughters of Old Westport. They raised another $5,000 to have the home moved to its current location at 4000 Baltimore Avenue. During the move, the side portico, at the west entrance, was permanently removed.

On December 31, 1922, the house opened as a historical museum, but was unprofitable and closed. In 1940, the house was sold in a public auction and acquired by a commercial developer. It was used as doctor and dentist offices and as office space, but this venture also failed.

In 1970, the house was taken over by the small business administration.

On Oct. 18, 1972, the Historic Harris-Kearney House was listed on the National Register of Historic Places.

The Westport Historical Society purchased the 1855 Harris-Kearney House in 1976. The Society raised money and restored the home to its 1855 appearance.

In 1985, the 1855 Harris-Kearney House Museum opened to the public and is operated as a 501(c)(3).

== Modern day ==
The Westport Historical Society acquired the home and property in 1976 and restored the exterior to its pre-Civil War facade. In 1979, the society received a $10,000 grant for renovations. The home was restored with period-appropriate furniture, bedding and antiques. Many items are from descendants of the Harris and Kearney families. The museum is open for tours, private tours, weddings, meetings, and other events.
