= 1988 Kansas City explosion =

Industrial ammonium nitrate explosion

- Date: November 29, 1988; 37 years ago
- Time: c. 4:07 AM CST (UTC−06:00)
- Location: Kansas City, Missouri, United States; 38°58′19″N 94°32′36″W
- Type: Ammonium nitrate explosion
- Cause: Arson (disputed)
- Deaths: 6

On November 29, 1988, an explosion occurred at a construction site in Kansas City, Missouri, United States, killing six firefighters.

The cause of the explosion was attributed to arson, and five suspects were sentenced to life imprisonment in connection with the event in 1997. However, their guilt has been the subject of dispute.

== Background ==
At the time, U.S. Route 71 was undergoing expansion near 87th St in South Kansas City. As a result, two trailers containing approximately 50,000 pounds (23,000 kilograms) of the explosive ANFO were situated nearby for use as a blasting agent.

Shortly before the explosion, at 3:40 am, the Kansas City Fire Department received their first call alerting to a pickup truck fire on the construction site. The possibility of explosives catching fire was mentioned in this call. Pumper 41, consisting of a captain and two firefighters, was dispatched to the scene where it arrived at 3:46 am. Encountering two fires, Pumper 41 requested Pumper 30 also be dispatched. The captain and two firefighters of Pumper 30 arrived at 3:52 am. Suspecting arson, Pumper 30 then requested police be sent. Further communications between dispatch indicated both companies were wary of the trailers, which had by then caught fire.

== Explosion ==
At around 4:07 am, one of the trailers exploded, killing all six firefighters instantly. This was followed by a second blast 40 minutes later, although all fire crews had been pulled back at this time. The blasts created two craters; the first was 80-foot-wide (24 m) and 8-foot-deep (2.4 m), while the second was 100-foot-wide (30 m). The explosions also shattered windows within a 16-kilometre (10 mi) area and could be heard 64 kilometres (40 mi) away.

== Investigation ==
Over the next nine years, the ATF and Kansas City Police investigated suspects responsible for starting the fires with little luck. Eventually, they made a case against five suspects who were later indicted by grand jury in June 1996. All five went to trial, were convicted of arson causing death, and sentenced to life imprisonment without parole.

Bryan Sheppard, who was 17 at the time of the explosion, was released from prison in 2017 after the Supreme Court decision Montgomery v. Louisiana ruled his life sentence unconstitutional. Additionally, after filing suit against the DOJ, he obtained previously classified documents suggesting two security guards may have been involved in the explosion.
