= Horace M. Peterson III =

American archivist and historian

Horace M. "Pete" Peterson III (November 23, 1945 - March 1992) was an archivist and historian.

== Early life ==
Peterson was born in Tulsa, Oklahoma and graduated from Central High School in Kansas City in 1964. He attended Arkansas A&M in Pine Bluff, Arkansas and received a Bachelor of Arts in sociology in 1968.

== Work ==
Peterson continued his studies at the University of Missouri, Kansas City, the University of Wisconsin, and the University of California, Berkeley and took internships at the National Archives and Record Service in Washington D.C., the National Record Center in Kansas City, Missouri and the J. Paul Getty Museum Management Institute. During his studies, he began to collect valuable artifacts and documents in an effort to preserve the history of African-Americans in the Midwest. These collections would form the beginning of the Black Archives of Mid-America, which Peterson founded in 1976 and would serve as its executive director.

The original Emancipation Proclamation was displayed at Kansas City's Nelson-Atkins Museum of Art in 1980 due to Peterson's work.

In 1992, Peterson was awarded one of Missouri's highest honors from the Governor of Missouri for outstanding contributions to bridging race relations. He died in a tragic drowning in March 1992. The visitor center at the museums in the 18th and Vine area of downtown Kansas City is named is his honor.

== Personal life ==
On December 23, 1978, Peterson married Barbara Peterson in Kansas City.

Peterson also went by the nickname "Pete."
