= Nelly Don =

American clothing company (1956–1978)

Nelly Don Inc.
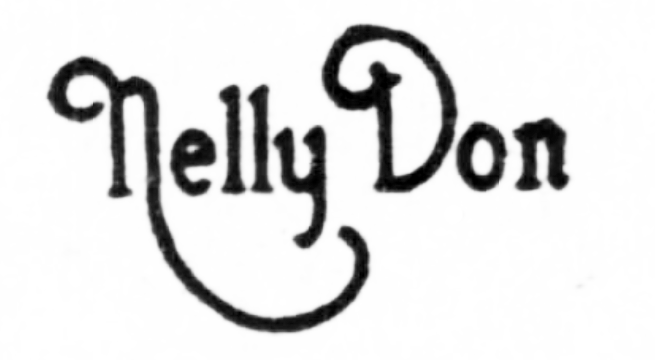
- Nelly Don logo, 1921
- Industry: Clothing manufacturer and distributor
- Founded: 1919; 107 years ago
- Founder: Nell Donnelly Reed
- Headquarters: Kansas City, Missouri

Nelly Don Inc. was a clothing manufacturer and distributor from 1956 to 1978. It was founded by Nell Quinlan Donnelly Reed in 1916 as a brand of the Donnelly Garment Company. The Donnelly Garment Company was renamed to Nelly Don after the founder retired and sold her interest in the company in 1956.

The company was headquartered in Kansas City, Missouri and had additional factories in that state. During World War II it designed the pattern for and made many of the uniforms for women in the military and factories, and made all of the underwear for men in the US military.

Nelly Don manufactured 75 million dresses from 1916 to 1978 making it the largest dress manufacturer of the 20th century. They were one of the first companies to apply assembly line techniques to clothing manufacturing. It was reported that she only had to dismiss one employee in the entire history of the company.

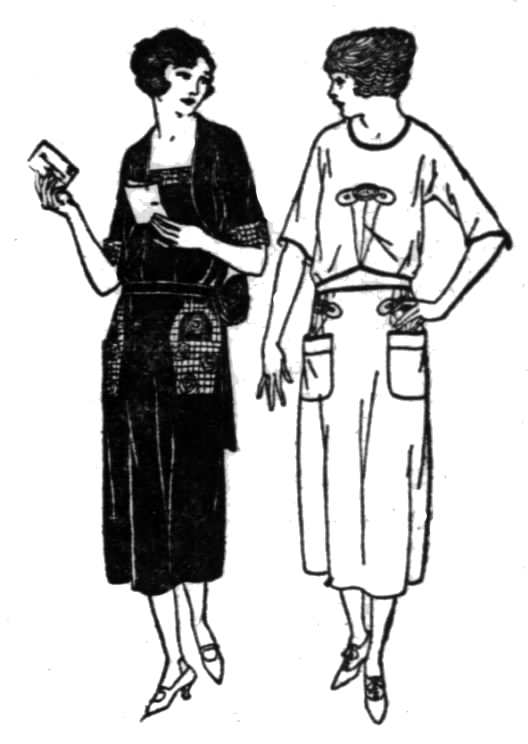
Two Nelly Don apron dresses, 1922

By 1947, the company employed over 1,000 people, the majority of which were women. Due to favorable working conditions, nearly 400 individuals worked for the company over 20 years.

After the sale of the company in 1956, the brand declined in popularity over the next 20 years and ultimately filed for bankruptcy in 1978.

A documentary film was made about this company titled Nelly Don: A Stitch in Time.

In March 2019, an original production, Nelly Don: the Musical, by the playwright and lyricist Terence O'Malley, debuted at the MTH Theater at Crown Center in Kansas City, Missouri.
