= John B. Gage =

American politician (1887–1970)

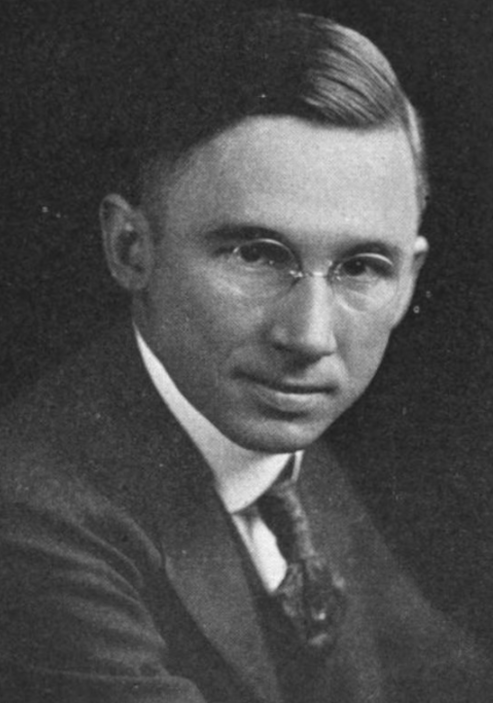

45th Mayor of Kansas City
- In office 1940–1946
- Preceded by: Charles S. Keith
- Succeeded by: William E. Kemp

Personal details
- Born: John Bailey Gage; February 24, 1887 Kansas City, Missouri, U.S.
- Died: January 15, 1970 (aged 82) Kansas City, Missouri, U.S.
- Party: Democratic
- Spouse: Constance R. Lane (m. 1916; died 1920) Marjorie Hires (m. 1922)

John Bailey Gage (February 24, 1887 – January 15, 1970) was an American attorney who served as mayor of Kansas City, Missouri from 1940 to 1946. He made reforms following the collapse of the political machine of Thomas Pendergast.

== Biography ==
Gage was born on the 80-acre (320,000 m^{2}) family farm at 9th and Cleveland on February 24, 1887. He graduated from the University of Kansas in 1907. Following in his father's footsteps, he studied law and received his law degree from the Kansas City School of Law in 1909.

He married Constant R. Lane in 1916, and they had one child. She died in January 1920. Gage married his second wife, Marjorie Hires, in 1922, with whom he had two sons and a daughter.

In 1930, he started the Gage and Hill law firm in the Bryant Building at 11th and Grand. Following a series of mergers, the firm would become Lathrop and Gage in 1873 (via the Lathrop line).

After Pendergast pleaded guilty to income tax evasion charges in 1939, Gage, a Democrat, campaigned for mayor for the Citizens Association party consisting of both Democrats and Republicans. A signature aspect of the campaign was an appeal to housewives with the slogan:

Wanted: 75,000 women with pioneer courage...let us keep faith with those who blazed the trail.

He was to cut the city budget by $700,000, hired city manager L.P. Cookingham, and began to expand the city limits. He was elected three times.

He died on January 15, 1970, a month after being hit by a truck driver while walking to work at 11th and Grand Avenue in Kansas City.

Political offices
Preceded by Charles S. Keith	Mayor of Kansas City, Missouri; 1940—1946	Succeeded by William E. Kemp
