= Bryce B. Smith =

American politician (1878–1972)

Bryce Byram Smith
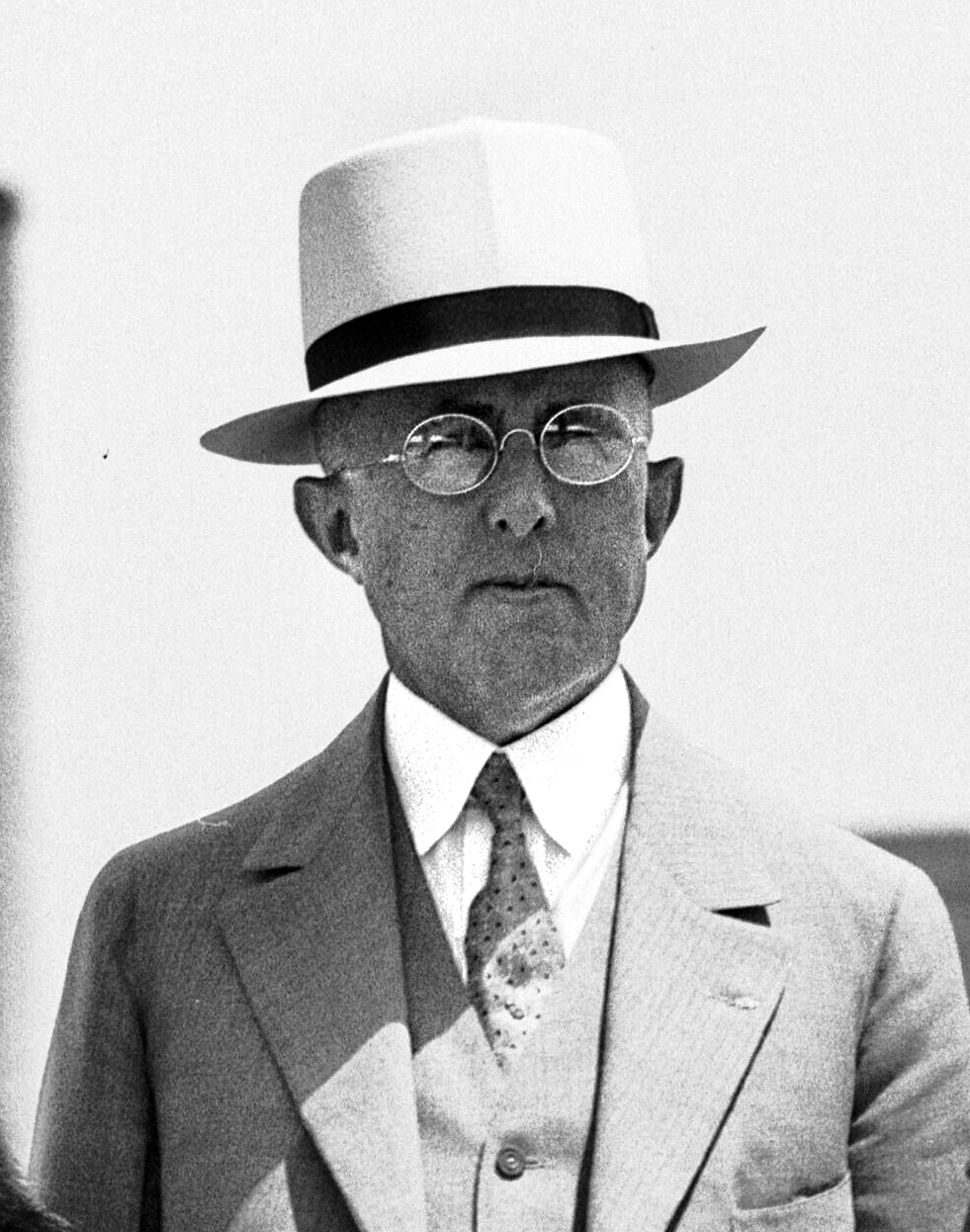
- Smith in 1932

43rd Mayor of Kansas City
- In office 1930 – January 5, 1940
- Preceded by: Albert I. Beach
- Succeeded by: Charles S. Keith

Personal details
- Born: Bryce B. Smith; 1878 Indianapolis, Indiana, United States
- Died: May 22, 1962 (aged 83–84)
- Party: Democratic

Bryce B. Smith (7 Dec 1878 – 22 May 1962) was the Mayor of Kansas City, Missouri from 1930 to 1940 at the height of power of the Thomas Pendergast political machine.

== Biography ==
Smith was born in Indianapolis, Indiana. His family moved to Kansas City in the 1880s and founded what would become General Baking Corporation.

He served on the city council from 1920 to 1924. He served as the 16th Grand Master of The Order of DeMolay from 1948 to 1949.

He was the second mayor under Kansas City's new city manager form of government with Henry F. McElroy as City Manager. Although declaring his independence of the Pendergast machine, he was to end up being associated with it.

Many of the landmarks of Kansas City were built during his term during what was called the "Ten Year Plan":

City Buildings:

- Kansas City City Hall which is one of the tallest city halls in the world
- Municipal Auditorium
- Establishment of University of Kansas City

Other Landmark Buildings:

- Nelson-Atkins Museum of Art
- Jackson County Courthouse
- Kansas City Power and Light Building

Much of the construction was done with Pendergast Ready Mixed Concrete.

Lax to non-existent enforcement of alcohol laws was to see the rise of Kansas City Jazz as well as prominent crime events. These include the Kansas City Massacre and a shootout that left four dead at the polls on Election Day in 1934.

After Pendergast was sentenced to Leavenworth Federal Penitentiary for income tax evasion in 1939, it was discovered that the city was $20 million in debt. Smith made an effort to clean out the Pendergast machine operatives but ultimately resigned on January 5, 1940.

Political offices
Preceded by Albert I. Beach	Mayor of Kansas City, Missouri; 1930–1940	Succeeded by Charles S. Keith
