= Stuart Hall Building =

Building in Kansas City, Missouri

Coordinates: 39.0874°N 94.5875°W

East side of the Stuart Hall Building in the Crossroads Arts District

The Stuart Hall Building is located at 2121 Central Street in the Crossroads Arts District neighborhood of Kansas City, Missouri. The former commercial building is known as the Freight House Lofts or Stuart Hall Lofts.

== History ==
The seven-story building was constructed in 1910-1911 as a manufacturing facility for the National Biscuit Company. To this day, the massive brick ovens still remain in the building. The building was later used as a warehouse for the Stuart Hall company. The building was not only a warehouse for the company, it was where the company's operations were located. The company made various paper items that included envelopes, spiral notebooks and notebook paper.

The Stuart Hall building was converted into 127 residential lofts, following a $24 million renovation project that was completed in 2004.
