= Fairfax District (Kansas City, Kansas) =

Commercial district in Kansas City, Kansas, U.S.

Coordinates: 39.1417°N 94.6125°W

The Fairfax Industrial District is a manufacturing area of Kansas City, Kansas, on the Goose Island river bend of the Missouri River. The US 69 Missouri River Bridge provides access to the district from Missouri's Platte County and Riverside community. The district's General Motors Fairfax Assembly Plant is a current facility in the district which has remnants of the runways used by the defunct Fairfax Municipal Airport and Fairfax Air Force Base.

== History ==
=== Early history ===
The district is on the Goose Island river bend (inner concave bank of a meander loop) that had been an island created by an 1880 flood that moved the Missouri River's "main current and the main and principal channel" from around the north, east, and south of the site to a low elevation on the west (Goose Island Chute).

By 1907 the state of Kansas had answered a Missouri petition and filed for ownership of the island, which was declared part of Kansas on March 22, 1909, by the United States Supreme Court (though in 1940, the USGS mapped the state boundary as a straight north-south line demarcating a small eastern portion of "Fairfax Airport" in Missouri).

When flow into the chute was stopped by the Goose Island closing dike, the island again became a river bend landform. "The city owned Kansas City Public Levees, the city of Kansas City and the Fairfax Industrial District sponsored a project in which the United States Government constructed flood protection levees and walls around the district, including three pump houses to pump water" with 2 of the houses on the later airfield (the dike extended from Quindaro downstream around Goose Island to the mouth of the Kansas River.) The protected land along the river north of the city ("North Bottoms") was used for farmland which was partly used as an airfield for a 1921 "American Legion air meet".

=== Industrial development ===
"In late 1923, the Kansas City Industrial Land Company, a subsidiary of the Union Pacific Railroad, purchased nearly 1,300 acres of Missouri River bottom land and launched over $3.7 million of infrastructure improvements to create a modern industrial district." In 1924 the UPRR had railyards in the district and by March 1926, the district had "four miles of paved streets…six miles of railroad spur track…an iron and steel foundry, an oil refinery, a thresher assembly plant, two construction companies, a lumber mill, and an aviation school and small airfield." The airfield was named the 1925 Sweeney Airport then the 1928 Fairfax Airport—the latter had a natural gas field with 14 wells for extra revenue. Early passenger flights were by Universal Aviation Corporation, Southwest Air Service Express, and Central Air Lines; and in 1933 when American, Braniff, and US Airways were operating flights, Rearwin Airplanes and American Eagle were manufacturing aircraft in the district. A naval reserve air base was established at the airport in 1935 and in 1936, the Chrysler Motor Parts Company began operations along the airport.

=== World War II manufacturing ===
In addition to a World War II Navy Elimination Air Base, Air Force Plant NC was built (1st B-25 accepted in February 1942.) By May 1942 the Fairfax Division of the Fruehauf Trailer Company was in the district, and a dual hangar USAAF Modification Center was completed in October 1942. During the war a factory was started for a rubber company (completed post-war by Owens-Corning Fiberglas Corporation), and an air freight terminal for Military Air Transport was opened on March 2, 1945.

=== Post-war businesses ===
To liquidate military surplus, the Reconstruction Finance Corporation set up a depot in the district (72 flyable B-25J aircraft were sold to the public), and General Motors leased the Air Force Plant for automobile assembly (GM also built post-war F-84F aircraft at the plant.) Transcontinental & Western Air used the modification center for aircraft servicing until the Great Flood of 1951, and in January 1947 four new factories were under construction. In 1960 GM bought the former Air Force Plant it had been leasing since 1945 and then constructed a new 1985 factory when the airport closed. An annexation ordinance expanded the city limits to encompass the "United States Government [area of] 2 acres" and the airport's 925.8 acres (374.7 ha) with 13 buildings—the "Fairfax plat" was the area within the northeast corner of the Fairfax Industrial District of ~2,300 acres (930 ha). Fairfax Assembly opened in 1987 again and produced Chevrolet Malibu and Buick LaCrosse models. In July 2006, the Kansas City council offered $146,000,000 in bonds for GM to produce a new mid-size vehicle at the plant.
