= Fairfax Municipal Airport =

Airport in the U.S. state of Kansas

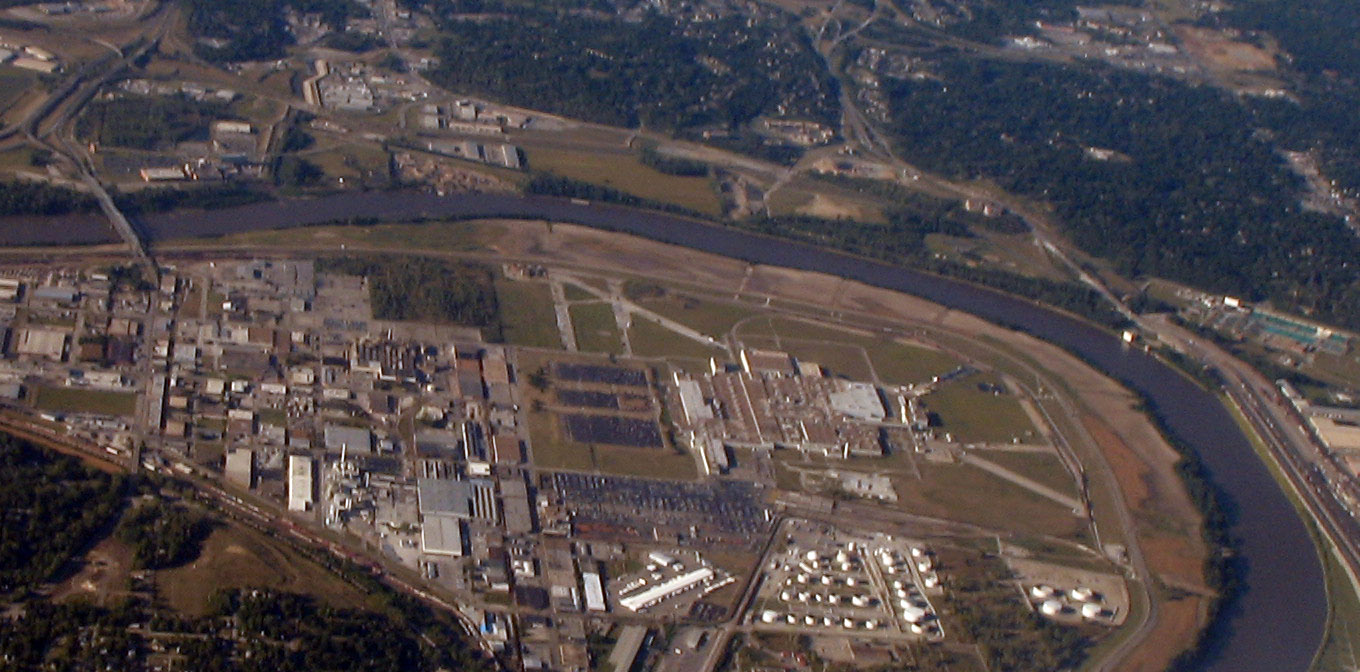
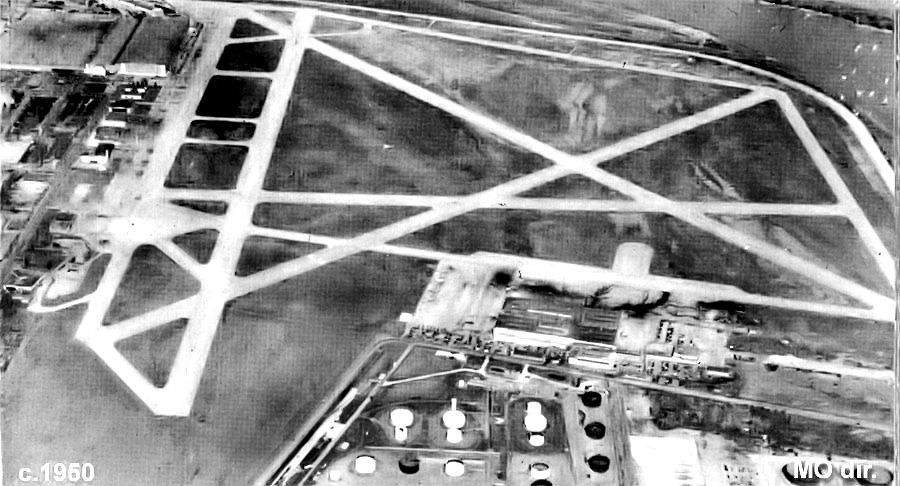
- The remaining runway sections of the airport are along the Missouri River (right) and on the north and east of the General Motors Fairfax Assembly Plant (right of center). Similar northward view in World War II: by 1949 runways were 6,500 ft (2,000 m), 6,100 ft (1,900 m), 5,800 ft (1,800 m), and 4,500 ft (1,400 m).
- IATA: KCK; ICAO: none – GNIS: 478637

Summary
- Airport type: defunct
- In use: 1921–85
- Coordinates: 39°08′53″N 094°35′59″W

Map
- Located mostly within Kansas, the Fairfax airport was north of the Kansas City Downtown Airport in Missouri.

Fairfax Municipal Airport (known as Fairfax Field during World War II) was an airfield located in Kansas City, Kansas, established in 1921. It also saw military use from 1935–1949, with Federal land adjacent to the airfield including a B-25 Mitchell manufacturing plant and modification center and a Military Air Transport terminal. After being used as a United States Air Force base during the Cold War, it was used for airliner servicing by TWA and for automobile and jet fighter aircraft production by General Motors, which subsequently built the General Motors Fairfax Assembly Plant over the former runways when the airport was closed.

== Background ==
The airport site is on the Goose Island (Kansas) river bend. At Goose Island, the United States Government constructed flood protection levees and walls around the Fairfax Industrial District, as well as three pump houses including two on the airfield that was first used for a 1921 "American Legion air meet". The airfield was subsequently used by Emory J. Sweeney's School of Aviation.

== Sweeney Airport ==
Sweeney Airport was named in 1925, and the 403 Pursuit Squadron was assigned to Kansas City at the end of 1925. The "Fairfax plat" map with the airport was drawn on April 1, 1925, as an area "of 1,373.07 acres" outside the city limits divided as follows: "The Kansas City Industrial Land Company owned 1,122.85 acres; the Union Pacific Railroad Company owned 32.80 acres; eight private owners owned 72.18 acres; two railroads other than the Union Pacific owned 66.47 acres; land set aside for dedicated roads was 31.54 acres; [and] land on which dikes were built was 57.23 acres." Sweeney Airport was mapped by the United States Department of Commerce on July 17, 1928, as a trapezoid with 150 acres (61 ha).

== Fairfax Airport ==
Fairfax Airport was named in 1928 when Sweeney Airport "was taken over by Wood Brothers Corporation"--Charles Lindbergh and Phil Love landed at the airport "in Love's Ryan monoplane" on August 2, 1928. Dedicated in 1929, the facility was operated by the "Fairfax Airport Company" ("Fairfax Airports, Inc." in 1931), and the 1st Fairfax passenger service aircraft was a Fokker Super Universal cabin plane (5 passengers) of the Universal Aviation Corporation. The Southwest Air Service Express airline scheduled flights from "Fairfax Airport" to Dallas/Ft Worth in March 1929, and a "Travelair six-passenger carrier of Central Air Lines crashed on approach to Fairfax in January 1930. An "impressive structure" costing $60,000 and with pay toilets for extra profit was built in 193x as a new administration building, and the land also had a natural gas field with 14 wells for extra revenue (a post-WWII Phillips Petroleum tract was along tanks of the Great Lakes Pipe Line Company.) In 1933, the airport had hangars; airlines including American, Braniff, and US Airways; and aircraft manufacturers such as Rearwin Airplanes (American Eagle Eaglet aircraft were also being produced.) By 1938, the Eddie Fisher Flying Service used Waco RNF aircraft for flight instruction.

== Military support ==
Adjacent to Fairfax Airport was a 1935–42 naval reserve air base, which by 1940 was a Navy Elimination Air Base ("E-base", colloq.) for screening aviation candidates. Survey work for an Air Force Plant began in December 1940, and the city purchased the airport in February 1941 for $600,000 from the Kansas City Industrial Land Company. The United States Army Air Forces (AAF) leased the city's Fairfax Airport by 1941; when the Works Projects Administration allotted $1,536,717 for improvements and expansion of the 240-acre (97 ha) airport. The 4 civilian runways were improved with concrete of 150 feet in width and 185,000 square yards of parking apron.—the government also purchased an alfalfa field of 75 acres (30 ha) for the AAF plant and for right-of-way to the airfield. Groundbreaking for Air Force Plant NC, a "government-owned, contractor-operated" plant of North American Aviation was on March 8, 1941. (a USAAF Modification Center was built May–October 1942—a different modification center was at Kansas City, Missouri.) Fairfax's civilian manufacturing facility for Rearwin airplanes was bought in early 1942 by "Australian-owned" Commonwealth Aircraft Company which also opened a 2nd airplane factory in Kansas City, Missouri, at West Bottoms. Military Air Transport Service moved an air freight terminal to Fairfax on 2 March 1945 from Kansas City, Missouri, and the Fairfax military installation became an operating location of Rosecrans Army Airfield on April 15, 1945 (the Air Transport Command operating location at Fairfax was discontinued by December 6, 1945.)

== Post-war operations ==
By late 1945 Transcontinental and Western Air used the former modification center for aircraft maintenance until the Great Flood of 1951—the city of Kansas City, Mo., built the new Mid-Continent Airport for the TWA Kansas City Overhaul Base northwest of the city (the modification center was razed shortly after March 1985). Commonwealth Aircraft produced post-war Skyranger aircraft at Fairfax until "transferred in 1946 to the former Columbia Aircraft factory" in New York, and the Buick-Oldsmobile-Pontiac Assembly Plant adjacent to Fairfax Field, operating in the leased former bomber plant, "finished its first automobile in June 1946". Post-war military activations at Fairfax included the 4101st Army Air Force Base Unit (Reserve Training) on July 12, 1946 and the 564th Bombardment Squadron on January 6, 1947.

Despite a 1948 plan for the base to "be withdrawn from surplus", in "October 1949 the U.S. Air Force terminated its lease on Fairfax Airport, and the city of Kansas City, Kansas, regained control of the facility". An "annexation ordinance" expanded the city limits to encompass the "United States Government [area of] 2 acres" and the airport's 925.8 acres (374.7 ha) with 13 buildings—the "Fairfax plat" was the area within the northeast corner of the Fairfax Industrial District of ~2,300 acres (930 ha). On May 22, 1950, Fairfax's 2472d AF Reserve Training Center and 442d Troop Carrier Wing moved to Naval Air Technical Training Center Olathe. In 1950 Mid-Continent Airlines was contracted for airmail out of Fairfax (North Central Route#106 operations moved to the Mid-Continent Airport after the 1951 flood.) The 4610th Air Base Squadron at Fairfax Field became the April 1951 base operating unit for the nearby Air Force Base under construction at Grandview Airport (Fairfax's Air Defense Command units moved to Grandview Air Force Base after beneficial occupancy on February 16, 1954.)

== Municipal airport ==
Fairfax Municipal Airport was named by the time of the Great Flood of 1951 and in 1953 the F-84F Thunderflash aircraft assembly line was in the same 53-acre (21 ha) GM Assembly Plant. On June 20, 1954 a Zantop DC-3A crashed on approach to Fairfax, killing 3. Fairfax was the July 12, 1955 landing site of a TWA DC-3 trainer that "had just taken off from Fairfax" before colliding with and destroying a Cessna of Baker's Flying Service. The 1963 fatal journey for Patsy Cline's Piper Comanche began at Fairfax, and the airport was added to the GNIS on October 13, 1978. Fairfax's longest runway (17/35) was 7,301 ft (2,225 m) long when the airport's last flight departed on March 31, 1985, and on April 1, 1985, the land was added to the Fairfax District industrial area. The General Motors Fairfax Assembly Plant was completed in 1985 on the runways, and auto production at the former aircraft plant, which GM had purchased in 1960, ceased in May 1987. It was razed in 1989.
