= Fairfax District =

Fairfax District may refer to:

- Fairfax District, Los Angeles, California
- Fairfax District (Kansas City, Kansas)
