= 328th Armament Systems Wing =

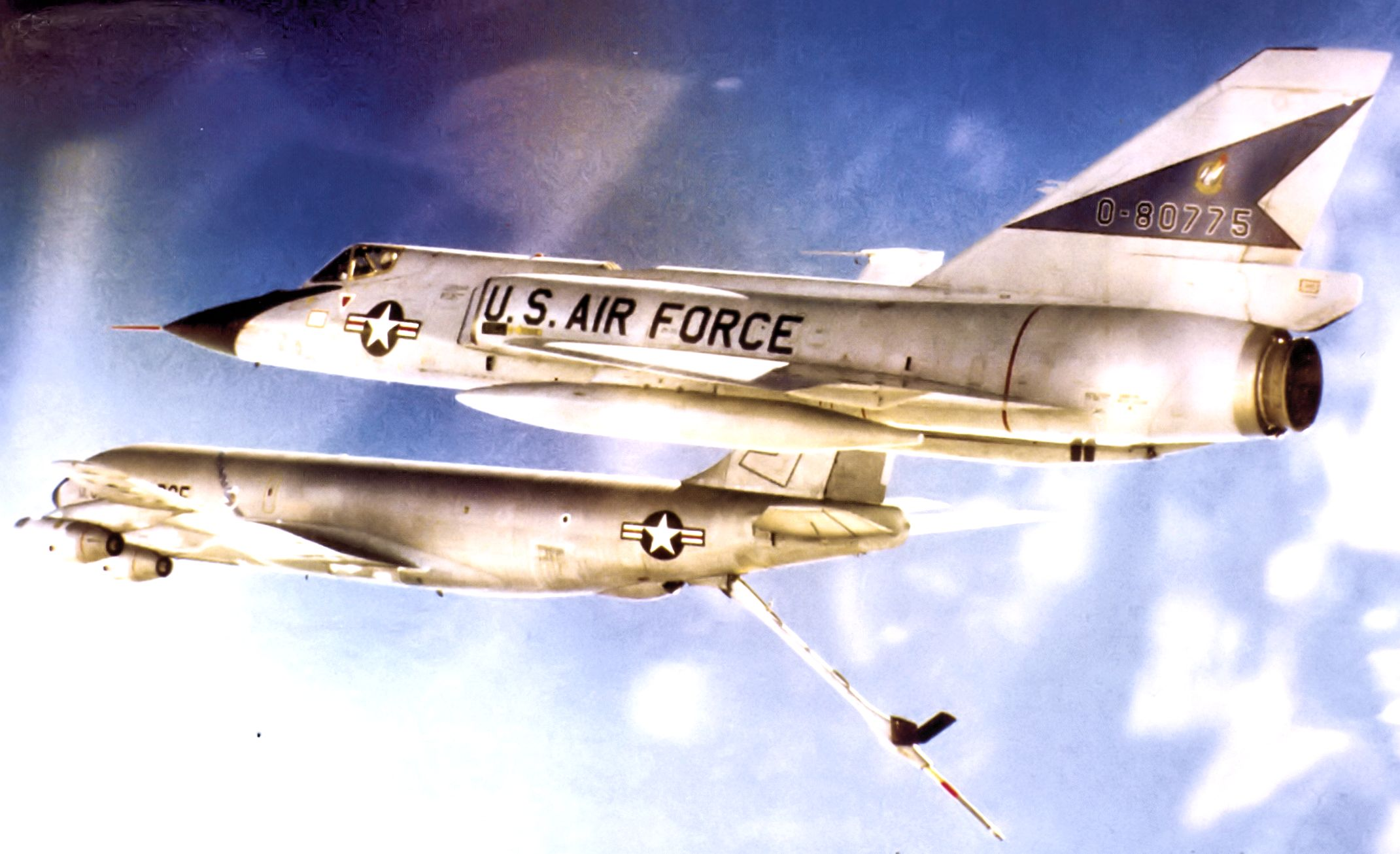
- 71st Fighter-Interceptor Squadron Convair F-106 (Note: Aircraft is F-106A-100-CO, serial 58-0775. This aircraft was retired to Aerospace Maintenance and Regeneration Center as FN0114 22 January 1987. Modified as a QF-106 drone and shot down by an AIM-120 20 October 1992.)
- Active: 1942–1944, 1955–1968, 2005–2007
- Country: United States
- Branch: United States Air Force
- Role: Weapons development management
- Mottos: Fast and Furious (WW II)

Insignia
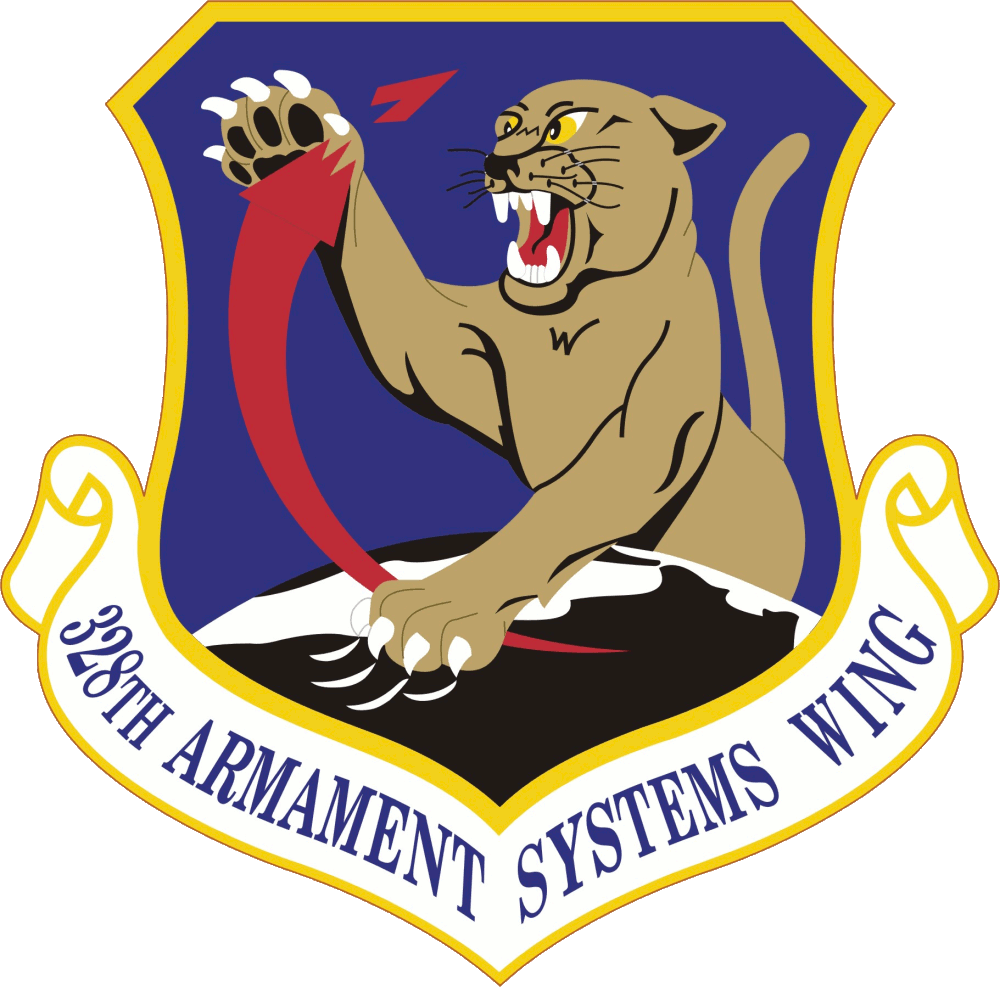
- 328th Armament Systems Wing emblem

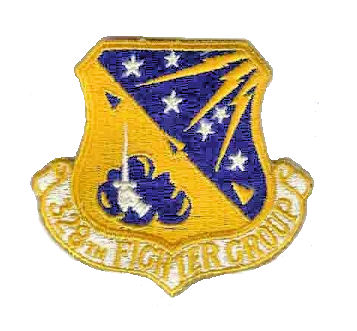
- 328th Fighter Group emblem (Note: Approved 24 November 1958.)

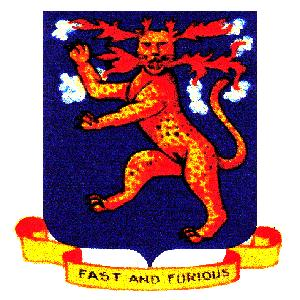
- 328th Fighter Group emblem (Note: Approved 23 February 1943. Description Azure, a natural panther rampant affronte or, incensed proper.)

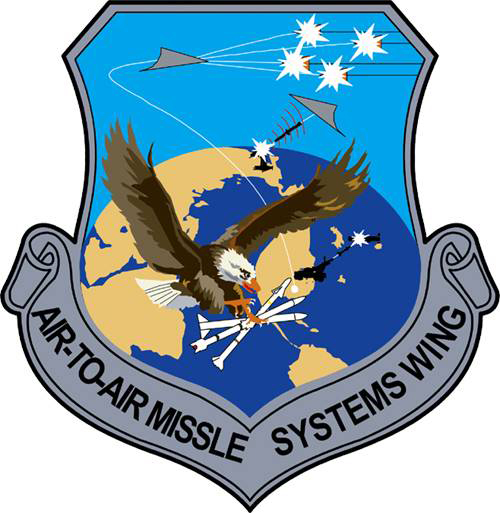
- Air to Air Missile Systems Wing logo

The 328th Armament Systems Wing is an inactive wing of the United States Air Force (USAF). It was last active in 2007, assigned to the Air Armament Center, part of Air Force Materiel Command (AFMC) at Eglin Air Force Base, Florida. It was first activated in 1942 as the 328th Fighter Group and served during World War II as a fighter aircraft training unit until disbanded in 1944 in a major reorganization of the Army Air Forces.

The group was reactivated in 1955 in a reorganization of Air Defense Command (ADC) in which ADC replaced its existing air defense groups with fighter groups that had served during World War II. It provided air defense for the central United States and supported all USAF units at Richards-Gebaur Air Force Base, Missouri. In 1961, the unit's mission expanded and the 328th Fighter Group was replaced by the 328th Fighter Wing until the wing was inactivated in 1968 and its remaining operational squadron was reassigned. In 1985 the 328th Group and Wing were consolidated into a single unit.

The wing was activated a final time in 2005 as the Air to Air Missile Systems Wing in the Air Force Materiel Command Transformation, which replaced the traditional staff office organization of the Air Armament Center and other AFMC centers with wing, groups, and squadrons. It was consolidated with the 328th in 2006, receiving its most recent name. In 2007 the wing was inactivated when all systems development activities at Eglin were moved under the 308th Armament Systems Wing.

== History ==
=== World War II ===
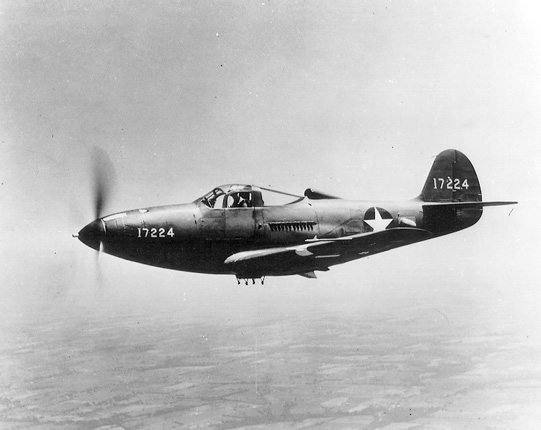
P-39 Airacobra as flown by the 328th Fighter Group

The 328th Fighter Group was activated at Hamilton Field, California in 1942 with the 326th, 327th, and 329th Fighter Squadrons assigned. The 328th group flew Bell P-39 Airacobras and participated in the air defense of the west coast. In the fall of 1942, the group dispersed to airfields in the San Francisco Bay area. The 326th Squadron remained with group headquarters at Hamilton, but the 327th moved to Mills Field Municipal Airport in October and the 329th to Oakland Municipal Airport in November.

While performing air defense duty it also acted as an operational training unit (OTU). The OTU program involved the use of an oversized parent unit, such as the 328th, to provide cadres to "satellite groups." In March 1943, the group added a fourth squadron, the newly activated 444th Fighter Squadron, at Hamilton. Once this squadron was organized, it moved to Tonopah Army Air Field, Nevada. 1943 saw a number of moves by the group's squadrons, although headquarters remained at Hamilton. In September the 444th returned to California and Concord Army Air Field, while the 329th Squadron left for Portland Army Air Base early the following month. In mid-December, both the 326th and 444th Squadrons established themselves at Santa Rosa Army Air Field, while the 329th took the 444th's place at Concord.

Starting in early 1944 the 328th began to act as a replacement training unit (RTU) for fighter pilots. RTUs were also oversized units that trained individual pilots or aircrews. This mission change was followed by the move of the 327th Squadron to Marysville Army Air Field, leaving only group headquarters at Hamilton Field. The Army Air Forces, however was finding that standard military units, based on relatively inflexible tables of organization, were proving poorly adapted to the training mission. Accordingly, a more functional system was adopted in which each base was organized into a separate numbered unit. The group was disbanded and replaced by the 434th AAF Base Unit (Replacement Training Unit) at Santa Rosa, where two of its operational squadrons were located.

=== Cold War ===
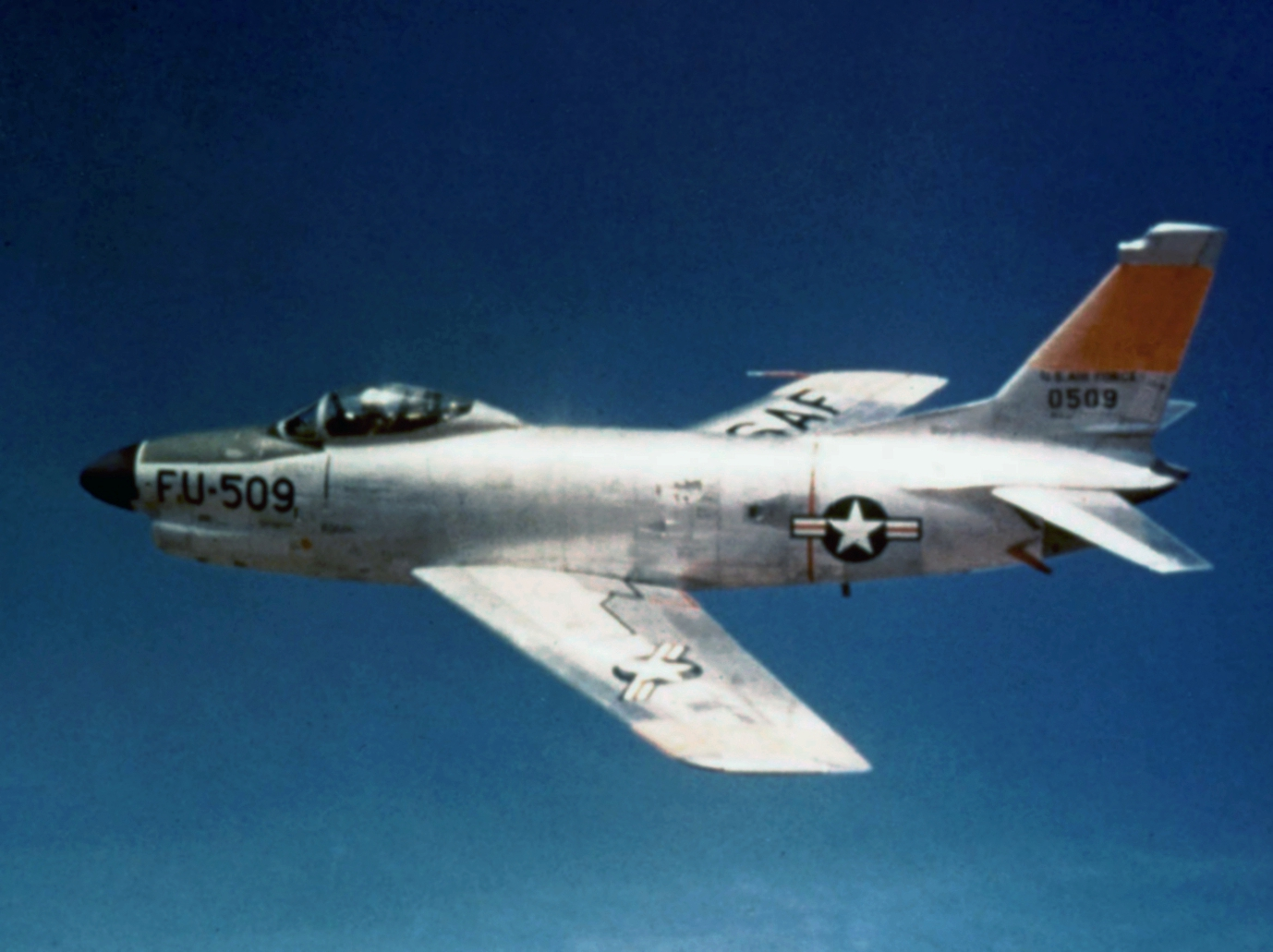
F-86D, group's initial postwar aircraft (Note: Aircraft is North American F-86D-5 serial 50–509.This aircraft was later used as a JF-86D chase plane at Edwards Air Force Base, California.)

The group was reconstituted, assigned to Air Defense Command (ADC), and activated as the 328th Fighter Group (Air Defense) in 1955. It replaced the 4676th Air Defense Group at Grandview Air Force Base, Missouri as part of ADC's Project Arrow, which was designed to bring back on the active list fighter units which had compiled memorable records in the two world wars. The personnel and equipment of the 4676th were transferred to the 328th, including its operational squadron, the 326th Fighter-Interceptor Squadron, flying radar equipped and Mighty Mouse rocket armed North American F-86D Sabre aircraft. The 328th provided active air defense for a portion of the central United States from 1955 until 1968. It was also the United States Air Force (USAF) host unit for Grandview. providing support for all USAF units located there. The group was assigned a number of support organizations to fulfill this function.

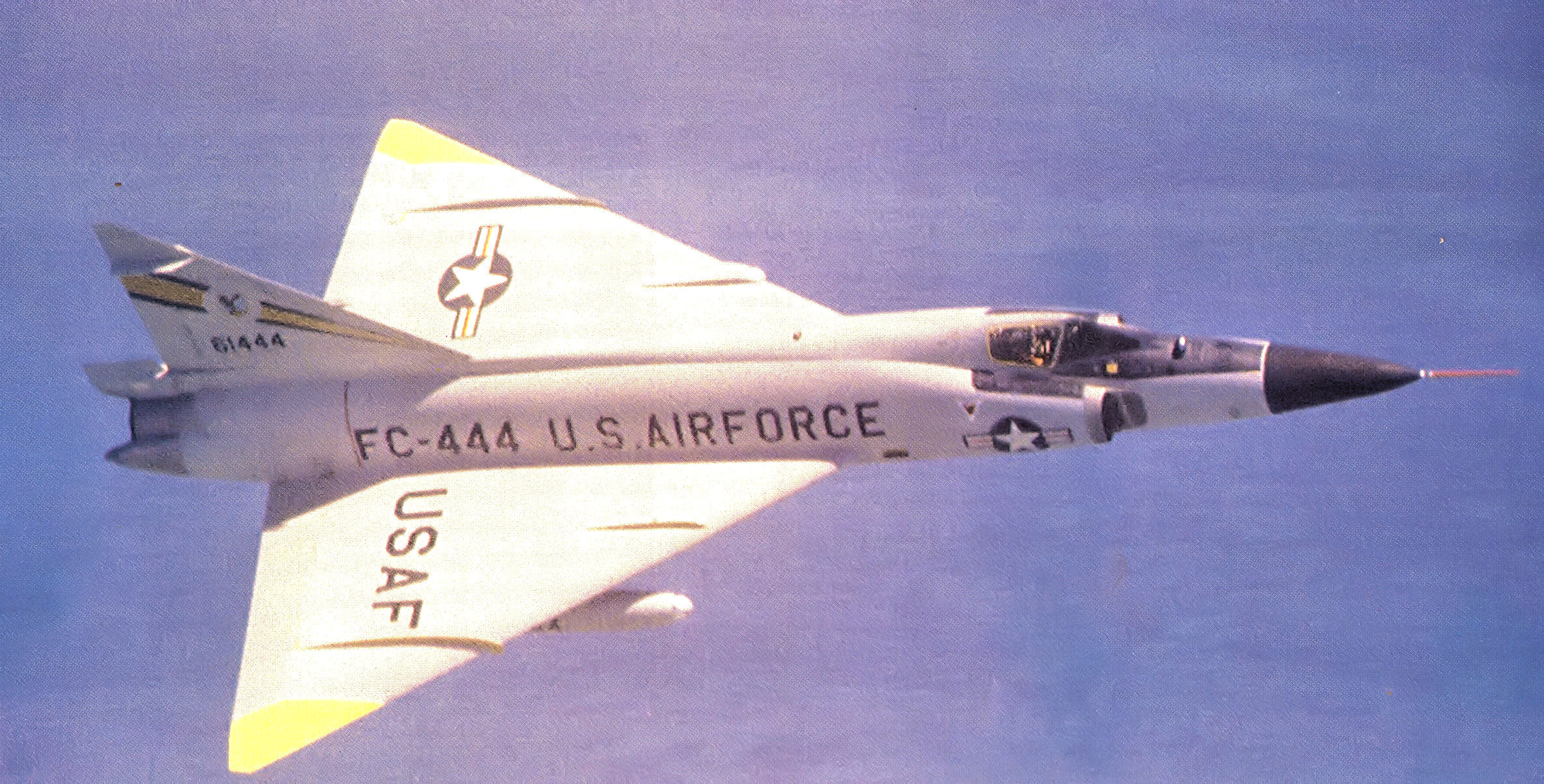
326th Fighter-Interceptor Squadron F-102 (Note: Aircraft is Convair F-102A-80-CO Delta Dagger serial 56-1444.)

The 326th Squadron upgraded to Convair F-102 Delta Dagger aircraft, armed with AIM-4 Falcon Air-to-air missiles by June 1957. In November, the 65th Fighter-Interceptor Squadron transferred on paper (without personnel or equipment) from Elmendorf Air Force Base, Alaska to the group, and was inactivated two months later without being crewed or equipped. In 1961, as the size of operations at Richards-Gebaur Air Force Base (Note: The base was renamed on 27 April 1957 in honor of Lt John F. Richards II, whose Nieuport was shot down over France in 1918 and Lt Col Arthur W. Gebaur, Jr., whose Republic F-84 Thunderjet was shot down over North Korea in 1952. Mueller, p. 499.) expanded, the 328th Group was replaced by the 328th Wing.

On 22 October 1962, before President John F. Kennedy told Americans that missiles were in place in Cuba, the wing increased its alert state, and the 326th Squadron deployed one third of its aircraft, armed with nuclear-tipped missiles, to Grand Island Municipal Airport, Nebraska. Following the end of the Cuban Missile Crisis, these aircraft returned to their home base. However, Starting on 19 December 1962, the wing established a detachment of fighters at Homestead Air Force Base, Florida. This operation ended on 15 February 1963. For one year, a similar detachment was established at Naval Air Station Key West, Florida, from 1 August 1965 until 1 July 1966.

In early 1967, the wing was briefly without an operational squadron, when the 326th Squadron inactivated Two weeks later, the 71st Fighter-Interceptor Squadron, flying Convair F-106 Delta Darts was assigned to the wing. In 1968, the wing was inactivated and the 71st Squadron was reassigned to the 28th Air Division, while the wing's support organizations were replaced by the 4676th Air Base Group.

=== Systems development ===
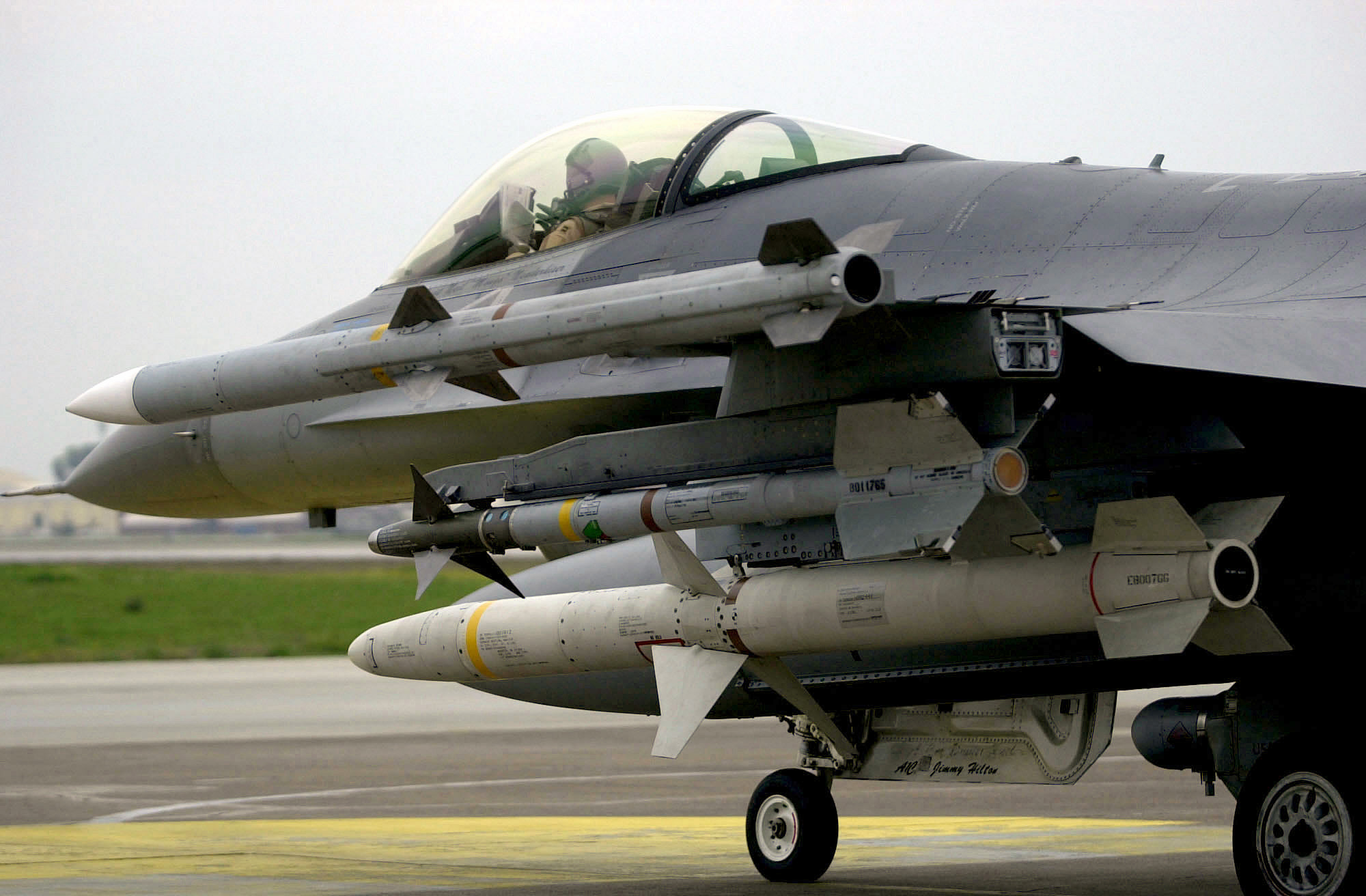
AIM-9 AIM-120 and AGM-88 on F-16C

The Air to Air Missile Systems Wing was activated at Eglin Air Force Base, Florida in 2005 as part of the Air Force Materiel Command (AFMC) Transformation, in which the command replaced its traditional program offices with wings, groups, and squadrons. The wing was a joint Air Force and United States Navy organization that performed "cradle-to-grave" management of air dominance weapon system programs. Systems managed by the wing included the AIM-120 AMRAAM (Advanced Medium Range Air-to-Air Missile), AIM-9X Follow-on Sidewinder, AGM-88 HARM (High-Speed Anti-Radiation) Missile Targeting System, Miniature Air Launched Decoy, & aerial target systems. The wing had two groups, two direct reporting squadrons and one detachment assigned.

The wing's 328th Armament Systems Group managed the Advanced Medium Range Air-to-Air Missile. This missile evolved over the years and is used by 32 nations in addition to the United States for offensive and defensive counter-air operations. This active radar missile has a range of more than 20 miles. The 328th Group was composed of the 695th Armament Systems Squadron, responsible for AIM-120C production, the 696th Armament Systems Squadron, responsible for AIM-120D development and the 697th Armament Systems Flight for mission support.

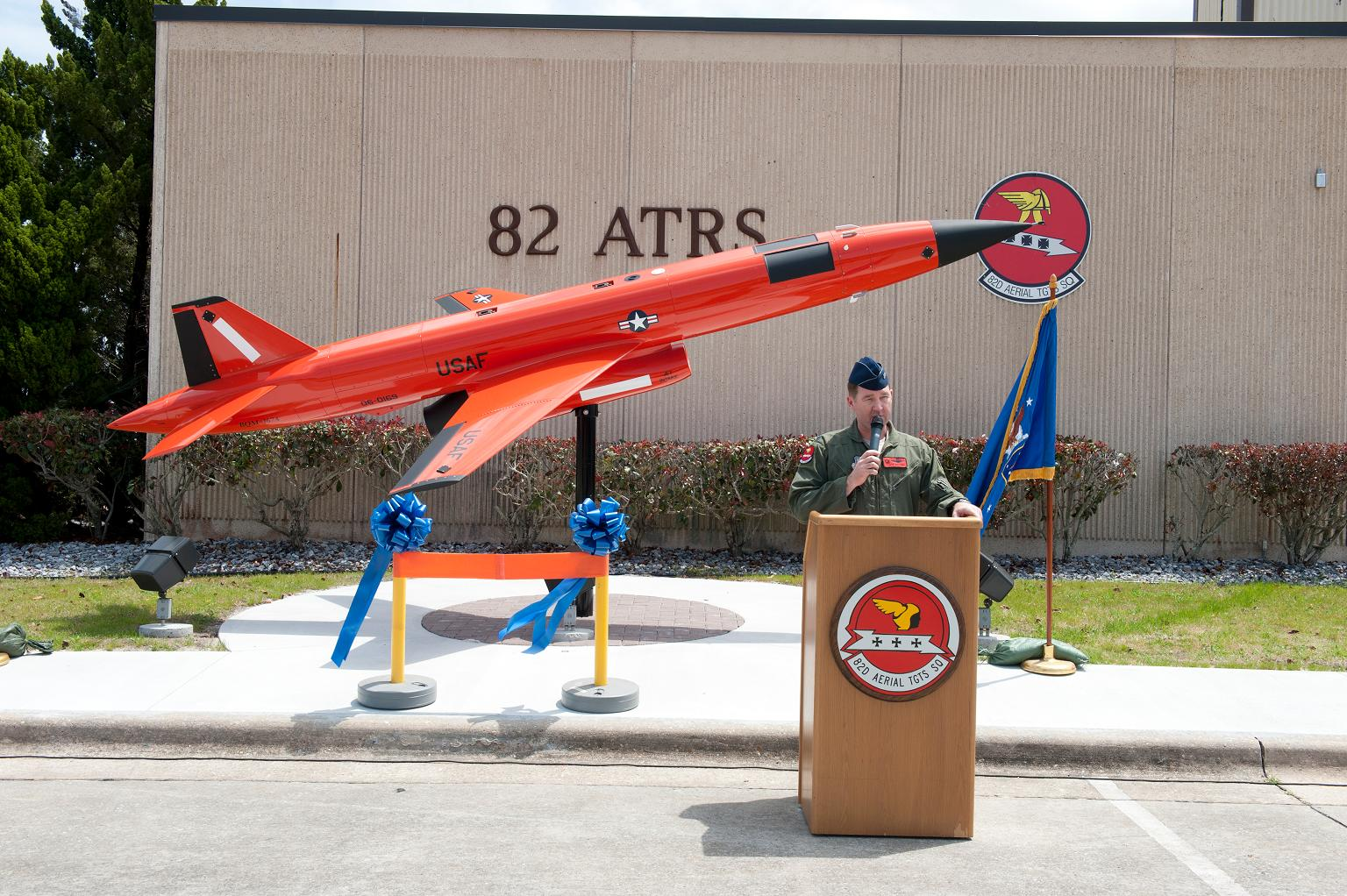
BQM-167 Skeeter

The wing's 728th Armament Systems Group managed Suppression of Enemy Defense and Destruction of Enemy Defense targeting systems, the Miniature Air Launched Decoy, and all Air Force aerial targets. These aerial targets included the McDonnell QF-4 Phantom II drone, Ryan BQM-34 Firebee, Beechcraft MQM-107 Streaker and the BQM-167 Skeeter. The targets are remotely controlled, employ countermeasures and provide "scores" on how well their missiles perform. The 728th Group was composed of three squadrons: the 691st Armament Systems Squadron, responsible for aerial targets; the 692nd Armament Systems Squadron, responsible for the Miniature Air Launched Decoy; and the 693rd Armament Systems Squadron, responsible for the AGM-88 HARM Targeting System.

Two additional squadrons, the 690th and 694th Armament Systems Squadrons, reported directly to the wing. The 690th Armament Systems Squadron worked with the United States Army and United States Marine Corps in developing an AMRAAM missile on a ground launch system for air defense. It was also responsible for information technology and facility support to the wing. The 694th Armament Systems Squadron was responsible for international sales of all wing weapons systems. Detachment 1 of the wing was located with the Naval Air Systems Command, PMA-259 at Naval Air Station Patuxent River, Maryland and was responsible for the Air Force portion of the latest version of the Sidewinder infrared-guided, short range air-to-air missile.

In May 2006 this wing was consolidated with the 328th Tactical Fighter Wing, as AFMC assigned its systems wings the numbers of World War II units. It was inactivated in 2007 and its subordinate groups were reassigned as the Air Armament Center consolidated its development units in the 308th Armament Systems Wing.

== Lineage ==
328th Fighter Group

- Constituted as the 328th Fighter Group (Single Engine) on 24 June 1942

Activated on 10 July 1942
Disbanded on 31 March 1944

- Reconstituted and redesignated 328th Fighter Group (Air Defense) on 20 June 1955

Activated on 18 August 1955
Discontinued and inactivated on 1 February 1961

- Consolidated with the 328th Fighter Wing as the 328th Fighter Wing (Air Defense) on 31 January 1984

328th Fighter Wing

- Constituted as the 328th Fighter Wing (Air Defense) on 28 December 1960

Organized on 1 February 1961
Discontinued, and inactivated on 18 July 1968

- Consolidated with the 328th Fighter Group on 31 January 1984
- Redesignated 328th Tactical Fighter Wing on 31 July 1985 (remained inactive)
- Consolidated with the Air to Air Missile Systems Wing as the Air to Air Missile Systems Wing on 3 May 2006

Air to Air Missile Systems Wing

- Constituted as the Air to Air Missile Systems Wing on 23 November 2004

Activated on 27 January 2005

- Consolidated with the 328th Fighter Wing on 3 May 2006

Redesignated 328th Armament Systems Wing on 15 May 2006
Inactivated on 7 September 2007

=== Assignments ===
328th Fighter Group

- IV Fighter Command, 10 July 1942 (attached to San Francisco Air Defense Wing, c. 28 October 1942 – 11 April 1943)
- San Francisco Air Defense Wing (later, San Francisco Fighter) 12 April 1943
- IV Fighter Command, 1 March 1944 – 31 March 1944
- 33d Air Division, 18 August 1955
- 20th Air Division, 1 March 1956 – 1 February 1961

328th Fighter Wing

- Kansas City Air Defense Sector, 1 February 1961
- Sioux City Air Defense Sector, 1 July 1961
- 30th Air Division, 1 April 1966 – 18 July 1968

328th Armament Systems Wing

- Air Armament Center, 27 January 2005 – 7 September 2007

=== Components ===
Operational Squadrons

- 65th Fighter-Interceptor Squadron: 1 November 1957 – 8 January 1958 (non-operational)
- 71st Fighter-Interceptor Squadron: 16 January 1967 – 18 July 1968
- 326th Fighter Squadron (later Fighter-Interceptor Squadron): 10 July 1942 – 31 March 1944; 18 August 1955 – 2 January 1967
- 327th Fighter Squadron: 10 July 1942 – 31 March 1944
- 329th Fighter Squadron: 10 July 1942 – 31 March 1944
- 444th Fighter Squadron 1 March 1943 – 31 March 1944
- Detachment 1, 328th Fighter Wing (Air Defense) NAS Key West, Florida
- Detachment 2, 328th Fighter Wing (Air Defense) NAS New Orleans, Louisiana
- Detachment 1, 328th Fighter Wing (Air Defense) Grand Island Airport, Nebraska

Support Units

- 328th Air Base Group (later 328th Combat Support Group), 1 February 1961 – 18 July 1968
- 328th USAF Infirmary (later 328th USAF Dispensary, 328th USAF Hospital), 18 August 1955 – 18 July 1968
- 328th Air Base Squadron, 18 August 1955 – 1 February 1961

Maintenance Units

- 328th Armament & Electronics Maintenance Squadron, 1 February 1961 – 18 July 1968
- 328th Consolidated Aircraft Maintenance Squadron, 8 July 1957 – 1 February 1961
- 328th Field Maintenance Squadron, 1 February 1961 – 18 July 1968
- 328th Materiel Squadron, 18 August 1958 – 1 February 1961
- 328th Munitions Maintenance Squadron, 15 September 1966 – 18 July 1968
- 328th Organizational Maintenance Squadron, 1 February 1961 – 18 July 1968

Systems Organizations

- Medium Range Missile Systems Group (later 328th Armament Systems Group), 27 January 2005 – 7 September 2007
- Special Application Systems Group (later 728th Armament Systems Group), 27 January 2005 – 7 September 2007
- Special Projects Squadron (later 690th Armament Systems Squadron), 27 January 2005 – 7 September 2007
- Air to Air International Support Squadron (later 694th Armament Systems Squadron), 27 January 2005 – 7 September 2007
- Short Range Missile Systems Flight, 27 January 2005 – 15 May 2006 (replaced by Detachment 1)

Naval Air Station Patuxent River

- Detachment 1

Naval Air Station Patuxent River

=== Stations ===
- Hamilton Field, California 10 July 1942 – 31 March 1944
- Grandview Air Force Base (later Richards-Gebaur Air Force Base), Missouri, 18 August 1955 – 18 July 1968
- Eglin Air Force Base, Florida, 27 January 2005 – 7 September 2007

=== Aircraft ===
- Bell P-39 Airacobra (1942–1944)
- North American F-86D Sabre (1955–1957)
- Convair F-102A Delta Dagger (1957–1966)
- Convair F-106 Delta Dart (1966–1968)

=== Campaigns ===
| Campaign Streamer | Campaign | Dates | Notes |
|---|---|---|---|
| | American Theater without inscription | 10 July 1942 – 31 March 1944 | 328th Fighter Group |

== See also ==
- List of inactive AFCON wings of the United States Air Force
- List of F-86 Sabre units
- List of F-106 Delta Dart units of the United States Air Force
