= 4676th Air Defense Group =

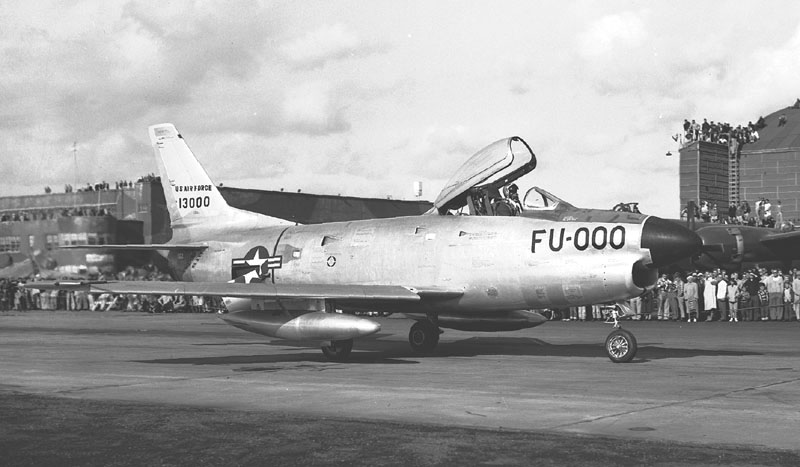
- F-86D Sabre as flown by the group
- Active: 1953–1955
- Country: United States
- Branch: United States Air Force
- Type: Fighter interceptor
- Role: Air defense

The 4676th Air Defense Group is a discontinued United States Air Force (USAF) organization. Its last assignment was with the 33d Air Division of Air Defense Command (ADC) at Grandview Air Force Base, Missouri, where it was discontinued in 1955. The group was activated at Fairfax Field in 1953 as USAF host for both Fairfax and Grandview. It moved to Grandview when that base was completed and added an operational air defense mission in 1954. It was discontinued in 1955 when ADC replaced air defense groups commanding fighter squadrons with fighter groups that had distinguished records in the two World Wars.

== History ==
The group was organized by Air Defense Command (ADC) in October 1953 when it replaced the 4610th Air Base Squadron, which had been organized on 23 February 1951, as the USAF host organization at Fairfax Field, Kansas. the 4676th was also the USAF host unit for Grandview Air Force Base, Missouri. The 4676th was assigned two squadrons and a medical unit to carry out its host responsibilities. The group was assigned the 326th Fighter-Interceptor Squadron, which was activated at Fairfax Field in December, flying radar equipped and Mighty Mouse rocket armed North American F-86D Sabre fighter aircraft as its operational component. The 326th's operational mission was air defense of the Kansas City Metropolitan Area and the central Midwest.

The group moved to Grandview Air Force Base on 16 February 1954. At this time military use of Fairfax Field ended. The group was discontinued and replaced by the 328th Fighter Group (Air Defense), which assumed its mission, personnel and equipment at Grandview (later Richards-Gebaur Air Force Base) as part of ADC's Project Arrow, which was designed to bring back on the active list the fighter units which had compiled memorable records in the two world wars.

== Lineage ==
- Organized as 4676th Air Defense Group on 8 October 1953

Discontinued on 18 August 1955

=== Assignments ===
- Central Air Defense Force, 8 October 1953 – 1 March 1954
- 33d Air Division, 1 March 1954 – 18 August 1955

=== Components ===
- 326th Fighter-Interceptor Squadron, 18 December 1953 – 18 August 1955
- 4676th Air Base Squadron, 8 October 1953 – 18 August 1955
- 4676th Materiel Squadron, 8 October 1953 – 18 August 1955
- 4676th USAF Infirmary, 8 October 1953 – 19 April 1954
- 613th USAF Infirmary, 19 April 1954 – 18 August 1955

=== Stations ===
- Fairfax Field, Kansas, 8 October 1953 – 16 February 1954
- Grandview Air Force Base, Missouri, 16 February 1954 – 18 August 1955

=== Aircraft ===
- North American F-86D Sabre, 1953–1955

== See also ==
- List of F-86 Sabre units
- List of United States Air Force Aerospace Defense Command Interceptor Squadrons
