= 326th Fighter-Interceptor Squadron =

Former US Air Force unit

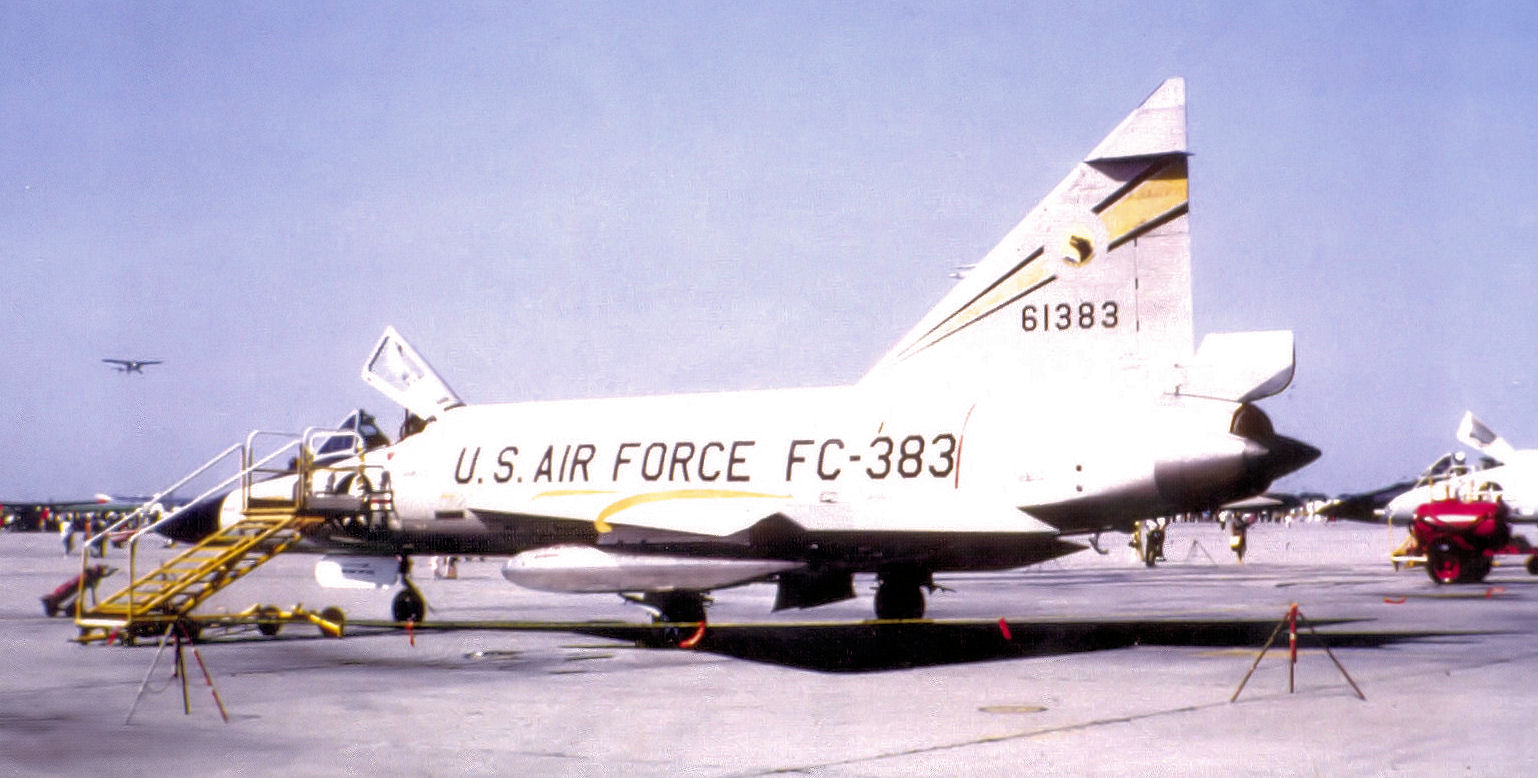
- Squadron F-102 Delta Dagger at Richards-Gebaur AFB in May 1964 (Note: Aircraft is Convair F-102A-75-CO Delta Dagger, serial 56-1383. This aircraft was lost on 22 December 1966 in a midair collision with F102A, serial 56-1375 over the Gulf of Mexico. Dirkx, Marco (8 July 2024). "1956 USAF Serial Numbers". Joe Baugher’s Serial Number List.)
- Active: 1942–1944; 1953–1967
- Country: United States
- Branch: United States Air Force
- Role: Fighter interceptor
- Nickname: Skywolves

Insignia
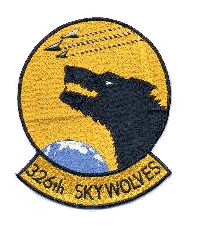
- Patch with the 326th Fighter-Interceptor Squadron emblem (Note: Approved 5 September 1961. Description: On an Air force golden yellow disc edged black, the silhouetted head of a snarling wolf issuing from sinister base, black, the wolf's eye white, below three stylized interceptor aircraft flying fesswise in chief, Air Force blue and white, leaving white trails to sinister; issuing from dexter base the top of a globe Air Force blue, land areas white.)

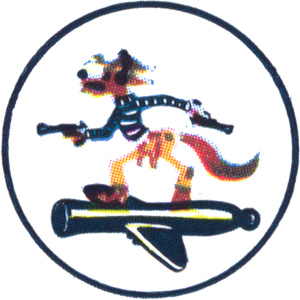
- 326th Fighter Squadron emblem (World War II)

The 326th Fighter-Interceptor Squadron is an inactive United States Air Force unit. Its last assignment was with the 328th Fighter Wing at Richards-Gebaur Air Force Base, Missouri, where it was inactivated on 2 January 1967.

== History ==
=== World War II ===
It was first activated as the 326th Fighter Squadron and served as an air defense and operational training unit until 1 March 1944, and then a replacement training unit until 31 March 1944.

=== Air Defense Command ===
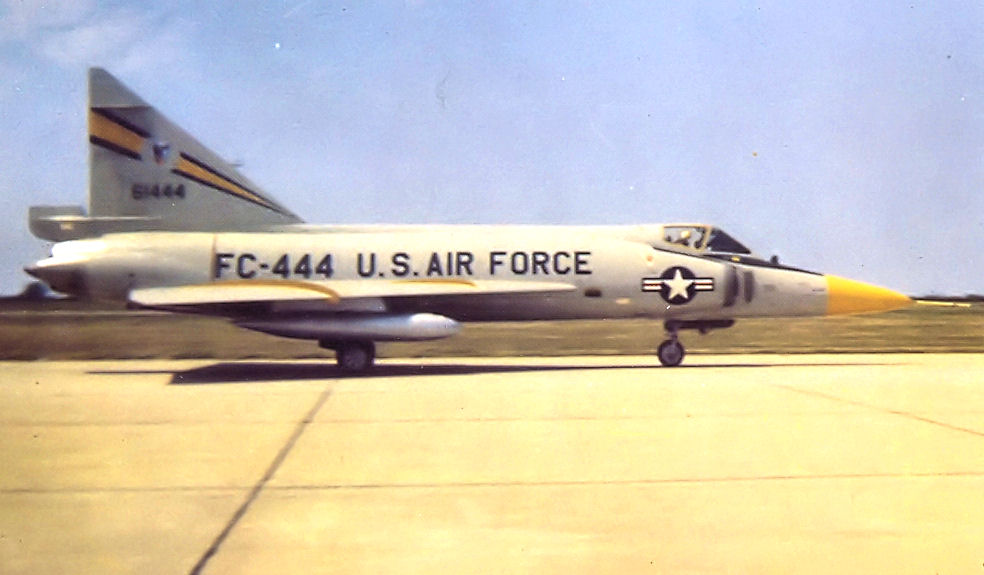
326th FIS F-102 56-1444 about 1960

The squadron was redesignated the 326th Fighter-Interceptor Squadron and activated in 1953 to provide air defense of the midwest United States from 1953 to 1967. The 326th flew radar equipped and Mighty Mouse rocket armed North American F-86D Sabre aircraft. The 326th Squadron upgraded to Convair F-102 Delta Dagger aircraft, armed with AIM-4 Falcon Air-to-air missiles by June 1957.

From 18 December 1953 – 1 March 1954, the 326th Fighter-Interceptor Squadron was assigned to Fairfax Field, Kansas, and an F-84 crashed near the city's business district killing the pilot and three residents.

On 22 October 1962, before President John F. Kennedy told Americans that missiles were in place in Cuba, the squadron dispersed one third of its force, equipped with nuclear tipped missiles to Central Nebraska Regional Airport at the start of the Cuban Missile Crisis. These planes returned to Richards-Gebaur after the crisis.

However, Starting on 19 December 1962, the squadron established a detachment of fighters at Homestead Air Force Base, Florida. This operation ended on 15 February 1963. For one year, a similar detachment was established at Naval Air Station Key West, Florida, from 1 August 1965 until 1 July 1966. From 1966 until inactivation, the 326th maintained a detachment at Grand Island Municipal Airport, Nebraska.

=== Lineage ===
- Constituted as the 326th Fighter Squadron on 24 June 1942

Activated on 10 July 1942

- Disbanded on 31 March 1944
- Reconstituted, and redesignated 326th Fighter-Interceptor Squadron on 23 March 1953

Activated on 18 December 1953
Inactivated on 2 January 1967

=== Assignments ===
- 328th Fighter Group, 10 July 1942 – 31 March 1944
- 4676th Air Defense Group, 18 December 1953
- 328th Fighter Group, 18 August 1955
- 328th Fighter Wing, 1 February 1961 – 2 January 1967

=== Stations ===
- Hamilton Field, California, 10 July 1942
- Santa Rosa Army Air Field, California, 13 December 1943 – 31 March 1944
- Fairfax Field, Kansas, 18 December 1953
- Grandview Air Force Base (later Richards-Gebaur Air Force Base), Missouri, 1 March 1954 – 2 January 1967

=== Aircraft ===
- Bell P-39 Airacobra, 1942–1944
- North American F-86D Sabre, 1953–1957
- Convair F-102 Delta Dagger, 1957–1967
