= Fairfax Field =

Former Air Force base in Kansas

- Part of 1951-4: Air Defense Command; 1944-tbd: AAF Technical Services Command tbd: Air Transport Command; 1935-1942: US Navy
- Located on Goose Island, Kansas, at the state line on the Missouri River west of North Kansas City, Missouri
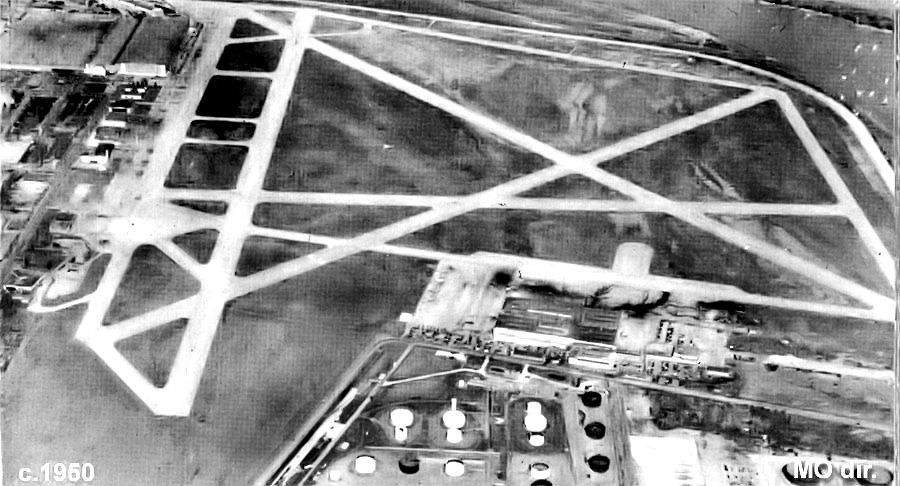
- Northward view of the air base in World War II after the modification center was built along the south taxiway.

Site information
- Code: FUDS - WRD (WWII weather station)

Location
- Coordinates: 39°09′10″N 094°36′43″W (1941-89 B-25/GM plant)

Fairfax Field was a wartime (WWII) facility of the United States Army Air Forces and later, the United States Air Force. The installation was north of Kansas City, Kansas. Used as a pre-war Naval Air Station, the United States Army Air Forces leased the municipal airfield and built an Air Force plant and modification center for North American B-25 Mitchell medium bomber production. Military use of the site continued as late as 1957 by the Strategic Air Command's 3903rd Radar Bomb Scoring Group for bombing practice.

Kansas City military sites in Missouri

Kansas City, Missouri, had military activities beginning as early as 1919 when the city was part of a recruiting campaign in which "seventeen flying fields, one repair depot, and five balloon stations" took part. In 1923 the Air Service's southern division of the Model Airway used an airfield in the city for an Army air route to Kelly Field, Texas; and by the end of 1925, the "403th [sic] Pursuit Squadron" was assigned to a Kansas City facility (the Air Service leased the land for the airdrome in Kansas City, Missouri, with steel hangars for $1/year.) In 1940, the USGS mapped the "State Boundary" as a straight north-south line demarcating a small eastern portion of "Fairfax Airport" as being in Missouri. By the end of 1942, Kansas City, Missouri, had a modification center--in addition to the Fairfax plant and modification center in Kansas. On 2 March 1945, Military Air Transport moved an air freight terminal to Fairfax from Kansas City, Missouri.

The USAF Central Air Defense Force (CADF) was activated with headquarters at Kansas City, Missouri, on 1 March 1951; on 24 April the Central Army Antiaircraft Command was "established with HQ at Kansas City" (organized 1 May 1951); and on 1 July the USAF 35th Air Division was activated at Kansas City (moved to Dobbins Air Force Base in September). The 4602d Air Intelligence Service Squadron--after being assigned to Peterson Field on 1 March 1952--had its Flight B assigned with "Defense Force Headquarters [at] Kansas City, Missouri". While Grandview Air Force Base was being completed, on 1 October 1952 Kansas City, Missouri, had CADF's Technical and Ground Training Division, and the NSA's Special Study Group met on 1 August 1953 at "Headquarters, Central Air Defense Force, Kansas City, Missouri".

Grandview Air Force Base
On 24 February 1954, HQ CADF moved to Grandview Air Force Base outside the city limits, but the land was owned by the Kansas City, Missouri government (from whom the USAF leased the airport on 1 January 1952--the "USAF accepted responsibility for [the base's] land and buildings" in January 1953.

== Background ==
The airfield was first used in 1921 for an air meet and became the 1925 Sweeney Airport and the 1928 Fairfax Airport. A naval reserve air base was established at Fairfax Field in 1935; a Navy squadron and a Marine squadron were established on 12 July. In 1937 Fairfax acted as an "army reserve base" with Douglas O-46 observation planes, and by 1938 the airport had four runways, including one 2,700 ft (820 m) long. Fairfax's "U.S. Naval Reserve aviation base", had a 30-day pre-flight training course in 1940.

== Navy Elimination Air Base ==
The "Marine Air Flight Program" established by 1 September 1940 at Fairfax's "Navy Elimination Air Base" (E-base) used "a physical and mental examination…ten hours of dual instruction…check rides and a fifteen-minute solo flight" for screening candidates to become Naval Aviation Cadets. A Fairfax "naval flying cadet… crashed into the Missouri River two miles northwest of the Fairfax air base" [sic] on 16 June 1942, Fairfax's naval aviation training moved in July to the new United States Naval Aviation Reserve Base at Olathe about 20 miles away. Fairfax still had "Barracks U.S. Navy" in 1946.

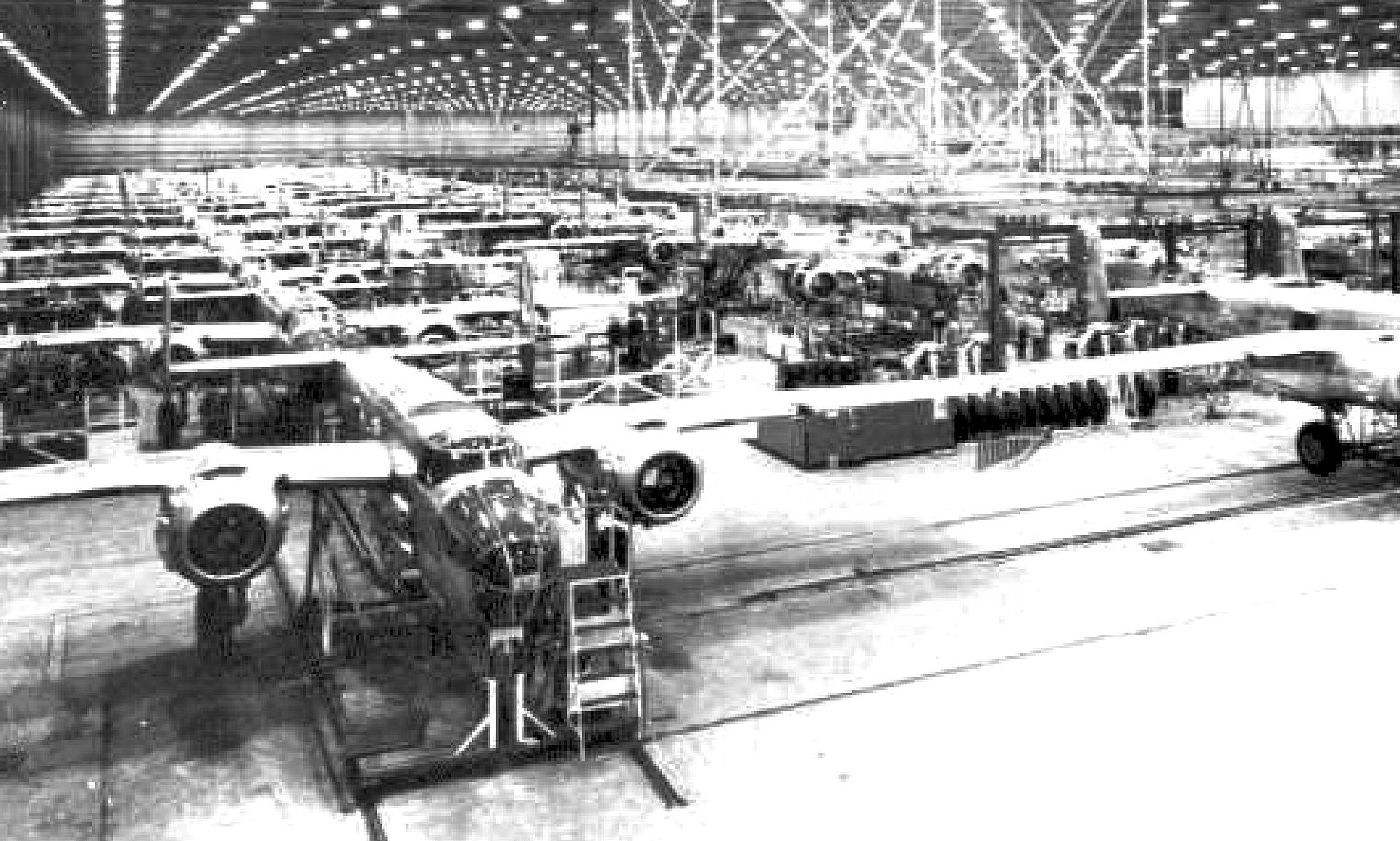
1944 B-25 Mitchell assembly line in Air Force Plant NC: In 1953, the facility was the Buick-Oldsmobile-Pontiac Assembly Plant adjacent to Fairfax Field and unveiled the assembly line for F-84F Thunderflash fighters (General Motors produced 599 F-84Fs at Fairfax.)

== WWII B-25 production, training, and modifications ==
Survey work for Air Force Plant NC had begun in December 1940, and the city of Kansas City, Kansas, purchased the airport in February 1941. The USAAF leased the Fairfax Airport from the city and the Works Projects Administration sponsored expansion of the four civilian runways. The government purchased a 75 acres (30 ha) alfalfa field for the plant and for right-of-way to the airfield. B-25 production began in December 1941, and Fairfax's first B-25D was accepted in February 1942. The Fairfax Modification Center was a dual hangar built May–October 1942 along the south taxiway for altering the new B-25s (a west extension and several outbuildings were added.) The 76th AAF Technical Training Detachment activated on 4 February 1943 (designated 5 October) and administered a 6 week hydraulics course for AAF mechanics under the direction of the Aircraft Accessories Corporation. About 300 students were admitted before the school was closed in October as a duplicate of a Chanute Field course. The 81st AAF Technical Training Detachment activated 22 February 1943 and designated, effective 30 August, to supervise apprentice crew chiefs at the Modification Center. January AAF policy was for each mechanic selected as a crew chief to be assigned an aircraft as it left the factory, review its modifications at the center, and deploy with it to the field unit. B-25 modifications only took a week until the B-25G gunship modifications for Pacific War anti-shipping missions, which took 2–3 months. Peak enrollment was 296 mechanics on 27 June, and the apprenticeship program was abandoned (the detachment inactivated on 31 October 1943.)

== WWII ferrying ==
Air Transport Command moved the 2d Ferrying Squadron of the 5th Ferrying Group from Dallas Love Field to Fairfax on 15 April 1943, and the squadron ferried out 157 B-25s during May Of 1,881 deliveries in 1943 by the Ground Ferrying Squadron all but 129 were B-25s, but at the end of that year Fairfax pilots began ferrying Martin B-26 Marauders from the Omaha modification center and Consolidated B-24 Liberators from a St. Paul facility. From May-Sep 1944 a detachment of Women Airforce Service Pilots was at Fairfax. The 33d Ferrying Group was designated on 1 April 1944 from the 2d Ferrying Squadron, which had been separated from the 5th Group on 1 January 1944 (393 officers and 578 enlisted men at the end of 1944). Women's Air Service Pilots were organized at Fairfax on 1 May 1944, and from Fairfax the 33d delivered 6,202 aircraft to CONUS bases and 251 abroad. On 22 September 1944 the 33d Ferrying Group began daily scheduled Military Air Transport (MAT) flights with military cargo/passengers to Minneapolis and Omaha (2 more daily flights were later added.) In October 1944, the modification center became an adjunct to the final assembly line. On 9 November 1944 the 33d Group furnished plane and crew to fly Senator Harry S. Truman from Fairfax to Washington for ceremonies following his election as Vice-President, and in early 1945 the 33d controlled ten operating locations.. During the Fairfax transition to P-80 production, the 33d Ferrying Group was discontinued.

== WWII air freight ==
On 2 March 1945, Military Air Transport moved an air freight terminal to Fairfax from Kansas City, Missouri, and had 362 personnel in June, the largest operating location in the division. For ferrying, Fairfax became an operating location of Rosecrans Army Airfield on 15 April 1945 with its pilots traveling to Fairfax for sorties. In 1945, 1,044 military transports used the field in July (e.g., President Truman for visits to Independence, Missouri). Plans for B-29 and F-80 aircraft production at Fairfax were never implemented, and B-25J production was terminated on 15 August 1945, after a total of 2,290 B-25Ds (152 Navy PBJ-1D variants) and 4,318 B-25Js had been built by the plant. The federal Reconstruction Finance Corporation set up a depot in the Fairfax district to liquidate war surplus not sent to depots or elsewhere for government use (reusable materials like aluminum and steel were reclaimed.) Seventy-two incomplete but flyable B-25Js were sold to the public. A USAAF C-47 crashed on 15 September 1945 on take off into the north bank of the Missouri River's curve, killing all 24 aboard. The Air Transport Command operating location at Fairfax was discontinued by 6 December 1945 (9 C-47s and 80 pilots/co-pilots transferred west to Topeka Army Airfield which had been chosen for a central MAT flight facility by November 1945.) The 4101st Army Air Force Base Unit (Reserve Training) was activated at Fairfax on 12 July 1946 (redesignated 2472d AF Reserve Training Center on 28 August 1948) and at the beginning of USAF planning, Fairfax activated the Reserve's 564th Bombardment Squadron on 6 January 1947 which sent 127 pilots to 1948 summer camp.

Kansas City Bomb Plot

Fairfax in 1945 had an early 2AF Radar Bomb Scoring (RBS) site which used an SCR-584 radar for evaluating bomber training The Kansas City RBS unit became a detachment of Colorado Springs's 206 AAFBU in July 1945, and in 1954 was Det 5 of the 10th RBSS. The detachment scored Convair B-36 Peacemaker runs during 1953, the 1955 SAC Bombing and Navigation Competition, and the 1957 "Operation Longshot". The Kansas City aiming point for the 1957 operation was "the base of the northeast corner of the Columbian Steel Tank Company" at the corner of 12th/Liberty streets. in the West Bottoms. In 1959, SAC's simulated bomb runs on Kansas City were scored using a longer range radar at Missouri's Joplin Radar Bomb Scoring Site (10RBSS Det 2) to the south which had moved from Oklahoma's Hollis Radar Bomb Scoring Site in July.

In October 1948, 37 Air Force Reserve planes at Fairfax flew 1,844 hours and in 1949, the 564th was replaced by the 442d Troop Carrier Wing (activated 27 June). Despite a 1948 plan for Fairfax to "be withdrawn from surplus", in "October 1949 the U.S. Air Force terminated its lease on Fairfax Airport, and the city of Kansas City, Kansas, regained control of the facility". On 22 May 1950, Fairfax's 2472d AF Reserve Training Center and 442d Troop Carrier Wing moved to Naval Air Technical Training Center Olathe.

== Fairfax Municipal Airport ==
Fairfax's 4610th Air Base Squadron temporarily evacuated Fairfax Municipal Airport due to a fire during the Great Flood of 1951 and on 1 October 1952, the squadron "opened" the nearby Grandview Air Force Base in Missouri (Grandview's beneficial occupancy began 2 years later.) In 1952 the squadron was renamed the 4676th Air Defense Group which began flying F-86 Sabres from Fairfax at the end of 1953.

In 1953, an F-94 crashed on attempting a return, killing the pilot and radar operator. From 18 December 1953 – 1 March 1954, the 326th Fighter-Interceptor Squadron was assigned to Fairfax, and an F-84 crashed near the city's business district killing the pilot and three residents.

On 1 September 1954, Air Defense Command (ADC) was placed under Continental Air Defense Command and all Fairfax ADC units moved nearby to the new Grandview Air Force Base near Kansas City, Missouri.
