= Richards-Gebaur Memorial Airport =

Former airport in Missouri, USA

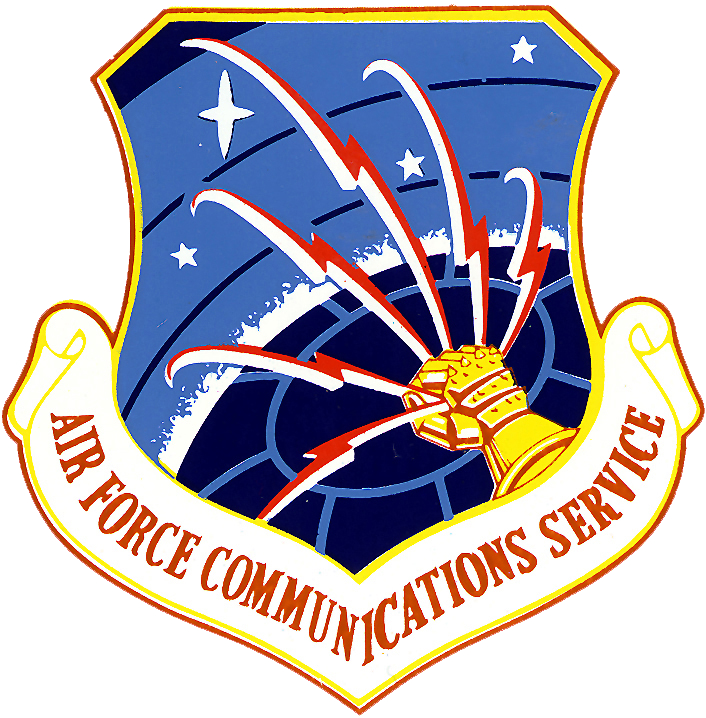
Richards-Gebaur Air Reserve Station
- Part of Air Defense Command; Air Force Communications Service; Air Force Reserve
- Located near Kansas City, Missouri
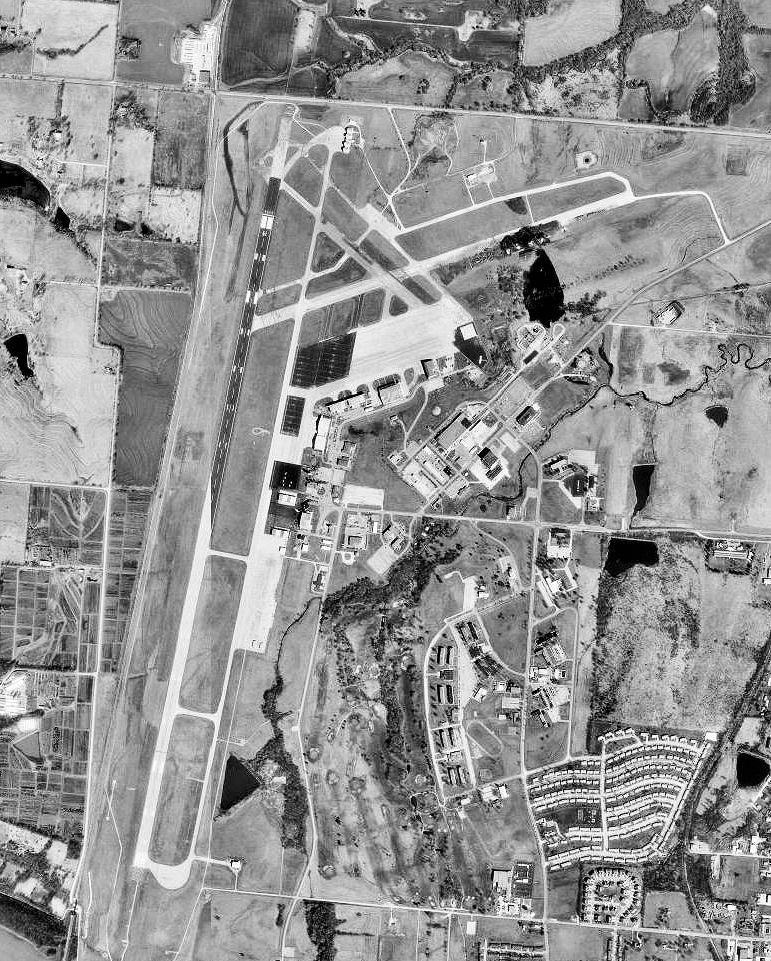
- Richards-Gebaur Air Force Station just after its closure, 23 March 1997, showing the Richards-Gebaur Memorial Airport shortly before its closure in 1999

Site information
- Controlled by: United States Air Force

Location
- Coordinates: 38°50′39″N 094°33′19″W

Site history
- Built: 1941
- In use: 1941-1994

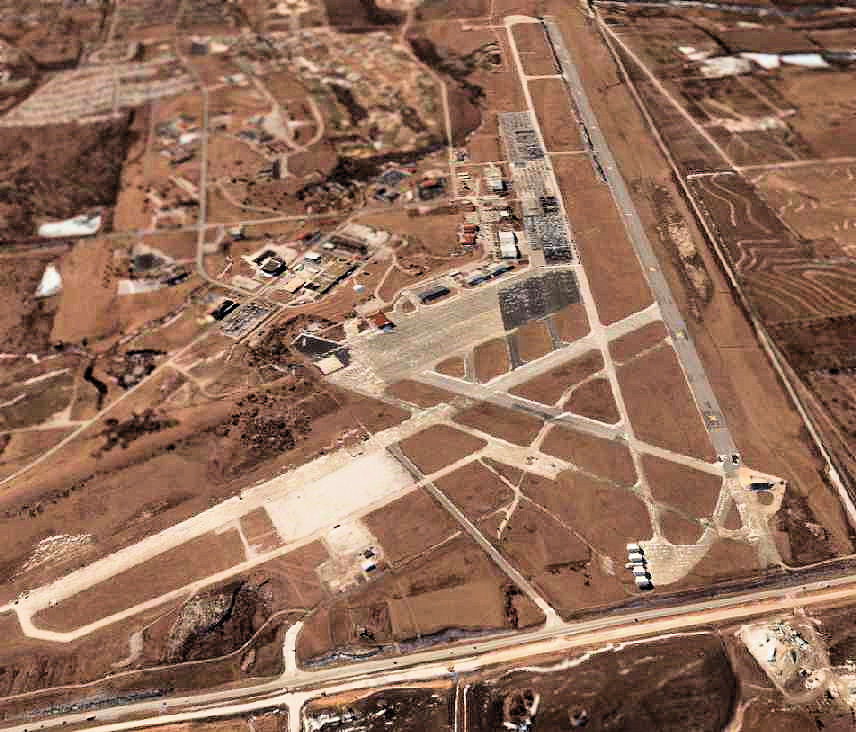
The former Richards-Gebaur AFB about 2003

Richards-Gebaur Memorial Airport is a former airport located about 20 miles south of Kansas City, Missouri, that operated alongside Richards-Gebaur Air Reserve Station (also Richards-Gebaur Air Force Station) until the base was scheduled for closure in 1994 until and was actually closed in 1999. Formerly, it was operated as Grandview Airport from 1941 until it was leased by the United States Army in 1944. In April 1957, the base was renamed in honor of Kansas City, Missouri-born aviators John Francisco Richards II and Arthur William Gebaur Jr.

== History ==
=== World War II ===
The City of Kansas City built Grandview Airport (IATA code GVW) in 1941. During World War II, the United States Army Air Forces I Troop Carrier Command built a facility on part of the airfield in 1944 which was used as a sub-base for Sedalia AAF (later Whiteman Air Force Base) for overflow traffic and training uses. The United States Navy also used the airport as an Outlying Landing Field (OLF) to Naval Air Station Olathe, Kansas where aviators were trained for carrier operations. The airport remained the property of Kansas City, Missouri.

=== During the 1950s ===
As a result of the Cold War military buildup, Grandview Airport was leased by the United States Air Force on 1 January 1952 and title was transferred to the Federal Government in November 1952. After some construction and upgrading of facilities, Grandview Air Force Base was opened on 1 October 1952, with the 4610th Air Base Squadron being the base operating unit (operating from Fairfax Field in Kansas City, Kansas). No military personnel were assigned prior to 1954 while major construction took place on runways, taxiways, aprons and support facilities.

Beneficial occupancy of Grandview AFB began on 16 February 1954 when the 4676th Air Defense Group (ADG) was moved by Air Defense Command to the new base from Fairfax Field. The 4676th ADG's mission included the management of the station facilities, commanding the Air Base squadron, Material and Supply squadrons, Infirmary and other support units. Shortly afterwards, in March 1954 the first operational flying unit, the 326th Fighter-Interceptor Squadron (FIS), was activated and assigned to the group. The squadron was equipped with F-86D Sabre interceptors. The 326th FIS upgraded to the F-102 Delta Dagger in 1957, and inactivated on 2 January 1967. Also in March 1954, the ADC Central Air Defense Force (CADF), a command and control organization established its headquarters at Grandview AFB, and the 20th Air Division activated its headquarters on 8 October.

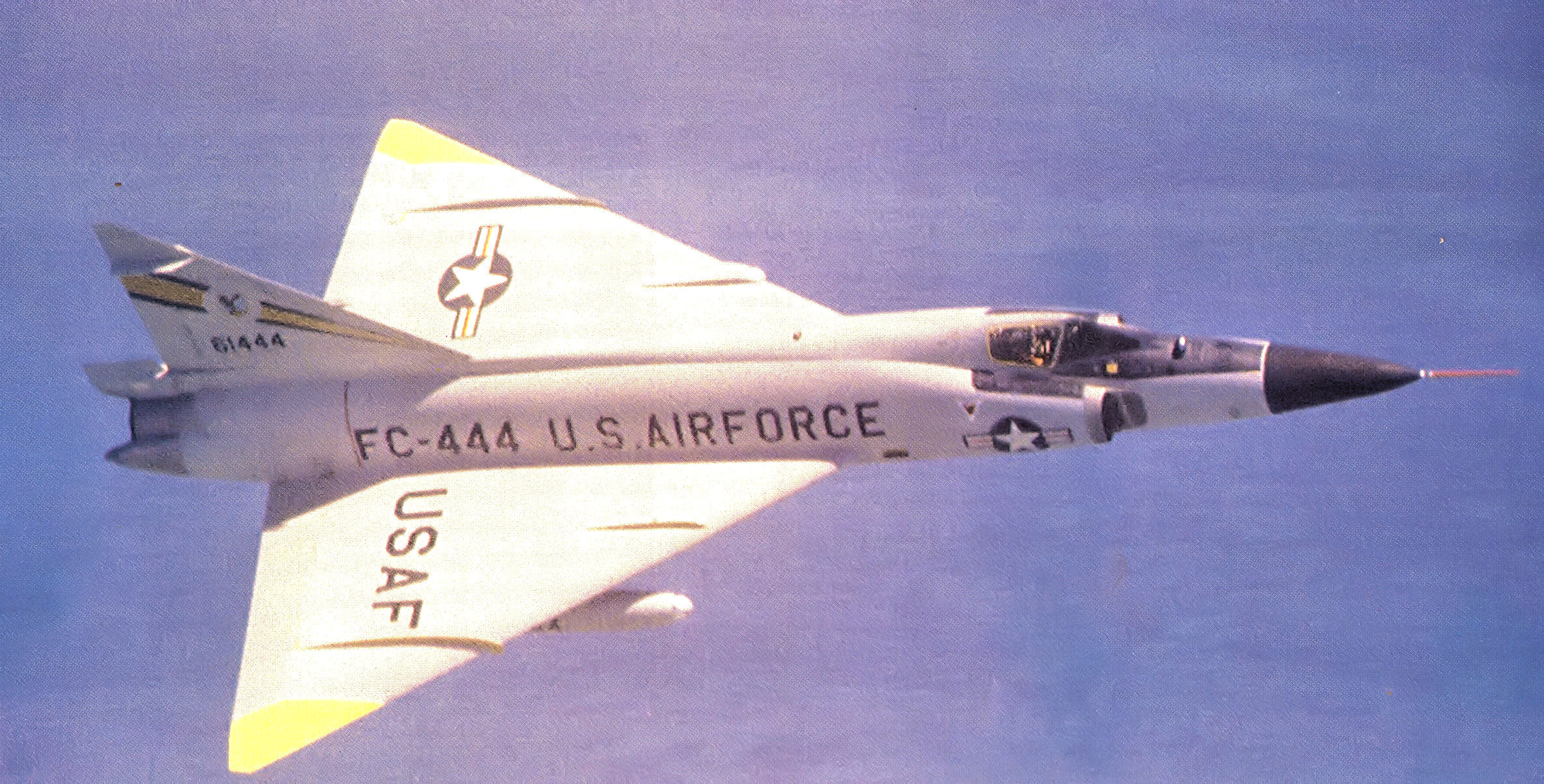
326th Fighter-Interceptor Squadron Convair F-102A-80-CO Delta Dagger 56-1444 about 1960

Early in 1955, additional units were stationed at Grandview. The 326th FIS came under the command of the 328th Fighter Group, (later the 328th Fighter Wing) which replaced the 4676th as host organization and controlled the interceptor squadrons at the base until inactivating in July 1968. The 71st Fighter-Interceptor Squadron arrived January 1967 from Selfridge AFB, Michigan with the F-106 Delta Dart, also inactivating in July 1968.

After a Federal Aviation Agency (FAA) memo in the early 1950s declared that the city's Kansas City Downtown Airport was the most unsafe major airport in the country, the city government built terminals and runways. north of the city at the new Mid-Continent Airport, which opened in 1956 and was later renamed Kansas City International Airport (retaining its original aviation code MCI). The airfield and other facilities at Richards-Gebaur were returned to the City of Kansas City, Missouri, in 1985.

Between 1983 and 1997 the city of Kansas City lost $18 million operating Richards-Gebaur Memorial Airport and in 1998, the Federal Aviation Administration approved a plan to close the airport. In 2001 the 8th U.S. Circuit Court of Appeals upheld the decision to close the airport in a suit brought by Friends of Richards-Gebaur Airport of Grandview, Missouri.

== Post-airport history ==
=== Civil ===
The former airport is now used as the International Freight Gateway (IFG) for CPKC Rail to ship cargo to and from Mexico. Several businesses, in major agreement with the City of Kansas City and the State of Missouri, are removing the old runway and facilities and building a large truck-to-rail freight center, with above-ground and underground storage. The CenterPoint-Kansas City Southern Intermodal Center will cover 1,340 acres (5.4 km^{2}) of rail and industrial space.

Phase I of the project will include 4,500,000 square feet (420,000 m^{2}) of covered industrial warehouses and distribution centers. Developer CenterPoint Properties of Chicago bought the property from the Port Authority of Kansas City, which still owns 100 acres (0.40 km^{2}) and with Hunt Midwest Enterprises, Inc., will mine limestone and create underground storage spaces.

Major transportation companies include Kansas City Southern railway and Schneider National, Inc., a truck line. Kansas City Southern's main line runs from the intermodal center at Richards-Gebaur all the way to a deep-sea Pacific port at Lázaro Cárdenas, Mexico.

The first phase is expected to cost $250M and when complete will be able to handle up to 250,000 shipping containers per year.

=== Military ===
The former military buildings and flightline facilities at Richards-Gebaur are now essentially abandoned, left in a deteriorating state. Most of the former buildings, including the Officers' and NCOs' Clubs, the base hospital, theater, and commissary, the Wing Headquarters buildings, and some of the base housing have been demolished. Around 2010, the former alert hangars and pads were demolished, along with the east–west runway, to provide space for roadworks providing access to the intermodal facility and the new National Nuclear Security Administration facility that was under construction to the north of the former base. The site also housed the USMC Mobilization Command (MOBCOM) until June 2011. The base also provided housing for the Marines that worked at the Defense Finance Accounting Service Kansas City (DFAS-KC) until its closure.

Many of the previous Air Defense Command structures remain intact, including the SAGE block-house, the control tower, and some hangars. Some buildings that had been used by the 442nd Civil Engineering Squadron buildings were reconstructed for civilian use, while others, including the base gymnasium, library, bowling alley, personnel office and law enforcement buildings, and some other offices and dorms that were acquired for use by the Calvary Bible College. The base's original swimming pool has been filled in and is now an open field.
