= Arthur William Gebaur Jr. =

American Distinguished Service Cross recipient

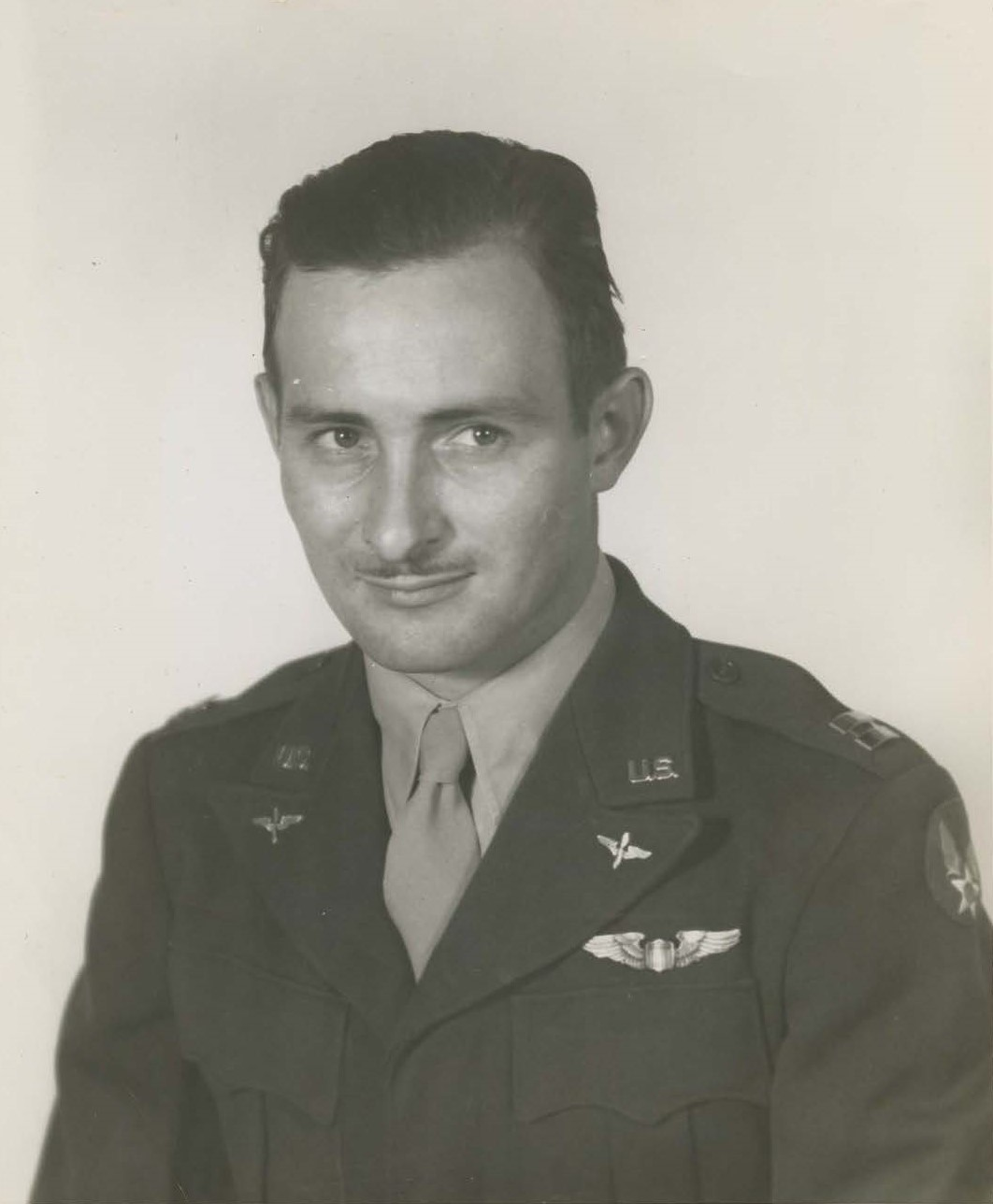
Gebaur as a captain circa 1947

Arthur William Gebaur Jr. (February 22, 1919–Missing in Action and presumed dead in Korean War on August 29, 1952) was posthumously awarded the Distinguished Service Cross for action in the war. The Air Force renamed Grandview Air Force Base Richards-Gebaur Air Force Base partly in his honor.

== Biography ==
Gebaur was born in Kansas City, Missouri. He graduated from Northeast High School in 1936. He was an active member of the ROTC reaching the rank of Cadet 2nd Lieutenant. He was called Arthur by his teachers, but Jr. by his friends.

Upon graduation from high school, Gebaur was offered enlistment in the Army Reserve as a sergeant. Instead, he obtained a job as a clerk with the Mutual Life Insurance Company of New York at their Kansas City office.

Five days after the Japanese attack on Pearl Harbor, Gebaur enlisted in the Army at Fort Leavenworth, Kansas. He was designated an aviation cadet and sent for flight training in California and Arizona. In June 1942, Gebaur completed his training and was commissioned as a second lieutenant in the Army Air Forces. He spent the remainder of the war as a flight instructor training B-25 bomber pilots. Gebaur was promoted to first lieutenant in February 1943 and captain in May 1944. He was also awarded the Air Medal for his service.

In early 1946, Gebaur was sent to the Far East to help train Chinese pilots. In June 1947, he returned to the United States after seventeen months overseas. In August 1947, Gebaur was promoted to major. In October 1947, he became an officer in the newly formed United States Air Force. In May 1949, Gebaur became a student at the Air Tactical School at Tyndall Air Force Base, Florida. He graduated in August 1949.

In October 1951, Gebaur was sent to Korea as an F-84 jet fighter pilot in the 7th Fighter-Bomber Squadron, 49th Fighter-Bomber Wing, Fifth Air Force. While there, he earned the Distinguished Flying Cross and four additional Air Medals. In July 1952, Gebaur was promoted to lieutenant colonel. On August 29, 1952, he served as group leader on three missions in one day. Gebaur became missing in action during the third mission, a raid on the North Korean capital Pyongyang. He was posthumously awarded the Distinguished Service Cross for the second mission of that day and the Purple Heart after his status was changed to presumed killed in action.
