= Naval Air Station Olathe =

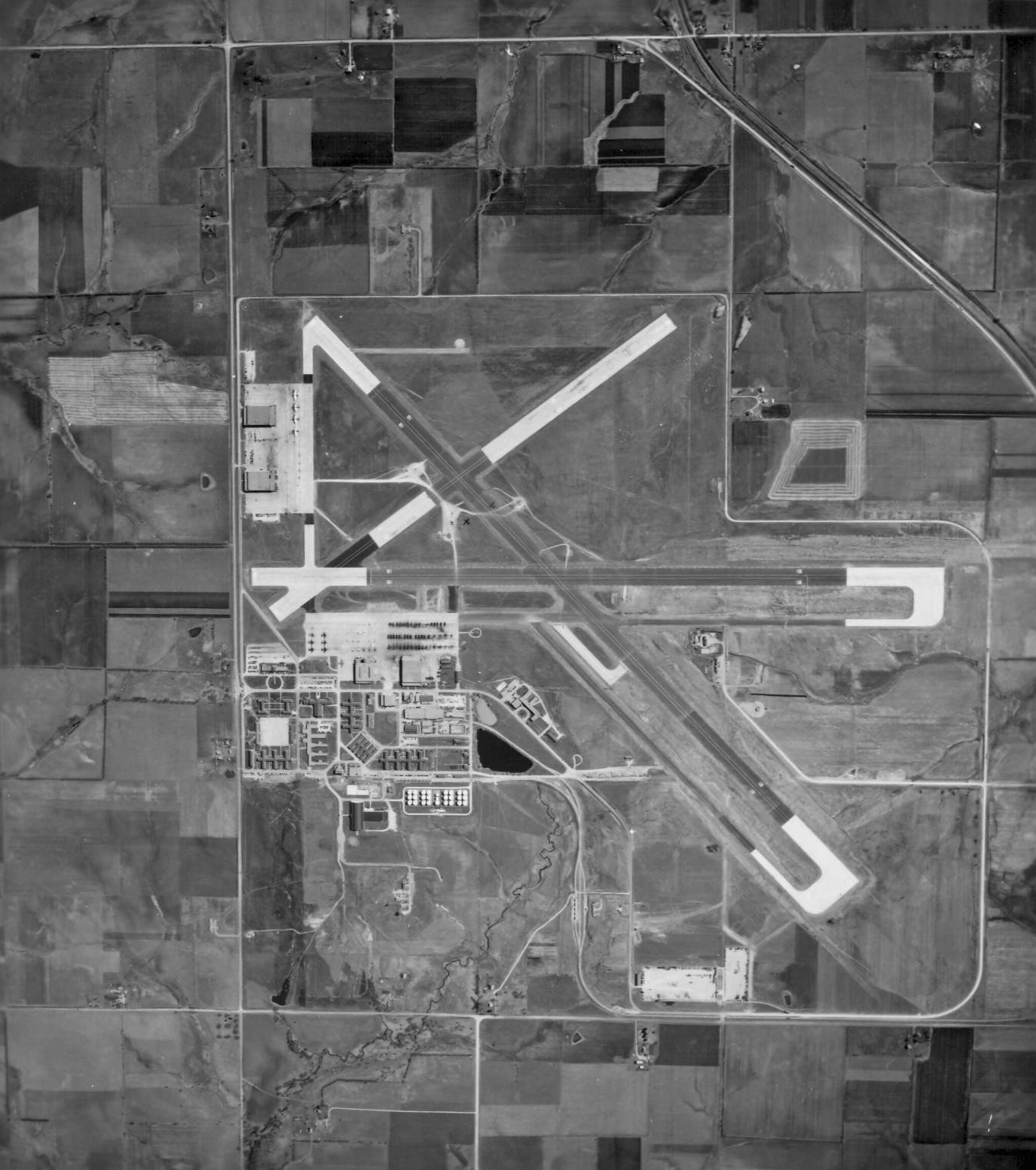
- Aerial view of NAS Olathe in 1944
- IATA: NUU; ICAO: KNUU

Summary
- Airport type: Military
- Operator: United States Navy
- Location: Gardner, Kansas
- Elevation AMSL: 1,087 ft (331 m)
- Coordinates: 38°49′51″N 094°53′25″W
- Interactive map of Naval Air Station Olathe

Naval Air Station Olathe is a former United States Navy base located in Gardner, Kansas. On its grounds at one point was Olathe Air Force Station. After it was closed, it was redeveloped into New Century AirCenter.

== History ==
=== Navy use ===
The base opened as Naval Air Station Olathe on 1 October 1942 and was referred locally as the Gardner, Kansas, Navy Base because it was to be used for the Naval Air Transport Service (NATS) and Naval Air Primary Training Command (NAPTC) which had been operating out of Fairfax Airport.

Future astronaut John Glenn was in the first class to be trained at the base and he was to make his first solo flight in a military plane from the base.

Glenn described the airport in its early days:

It was a sea of mud and we made our way from building to building on wooden 'duck boards'.

After World War II, NAS Olathe was used for flight operations by units of the Naval Air Reserve and Marine Air Reserve, as well as a Naval Air Technical Training Center Olathe (NATTC Olathe), a training center for active duty USN and USMC enlisted personnel. During the Korean War, NAS Olathe-based Naval Reserve Fighter Squadron 774 (VF 774) was recalled to active duty for two years, including six months of action aboard the aircraft carrier USS Boxer.

NAS Olathe's runways were lengthened in 1951 to accept the first tactical jets, North American FJ-1 Furys, to be based at NAS Olathe. By 1954, a Jet Transition Training Unit (JTTU) was established at NAS Olathe for propeller pilots transitioning to jet aircraft. F4D Skyray fighters were later operated at NAS Olathe by Naval Air Reserve and Marine Air Reserve squadrons until 1966. Marine Reserve Training and Naval Reserve Training continued from 1966 until at least 1971.

World War II hero, then-Captain, later Vice Admiral, James H. Flatley, Jr., commanded NAS Olathe for about a year. The base was renamed NAS Olathe (Flatley Field) for him in 1962.

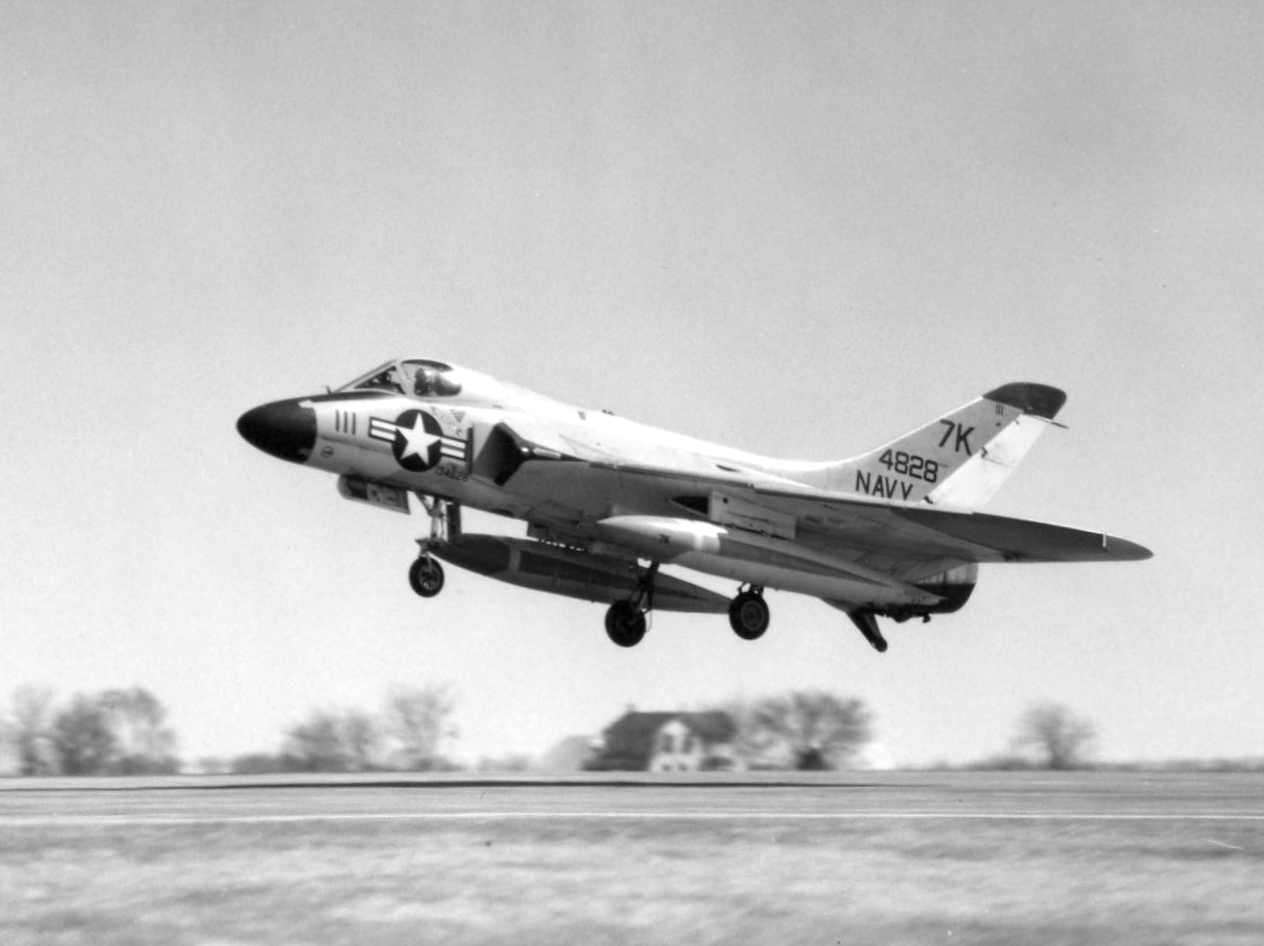
A US Navy Reserve F-6A Skyray taking off from Olathe, 1963.

For over 20 years, Naval Air Reservists and Marine Air Reservists from across the Midwest honed their skills and maintained their readiness with squadrons and support units at NAS Olathe. However, budgetary pressures of the Vietnam War forced NAS Olathe to close. The base was decommissioned on 29 October 1969 and the air station was officially closed in July 1970 with the understanding that the Navy could retain thirteen buildings for non-flying Naval Reserve aviation programs as Naval Air Reserve Center Olathe.

The airport was acquired by Johnson County in 1973 and renamed Johnson County Industrial Airport to reflect a new mission of being an industrial park (including the Fred Allenbrand Criminal Justice Complex for Johnson County). On 28 September 1994 the name was changed to New Century AirCenter so as not to minimize its aviation component.

In 1995, the Base Realignment and Closure Commission (BRAC) voted to close NAVAIRESCEN Olathe and consolidate its units and functions at other Naval Air Reserve activities, with all Navy activities ceasing in 1996.

The base was featured in a segment on the A&E Network entitled "Haunted America" in which it is claimed the base is the site of paranormal activity after a pilot crashed into an aircraft hangar next to the airport control tower in the 1950s.

=== Air Force use ===
From 1950 to 1955, the Air Force Reserve's 442d Troop Carrier Wing was temporarily based at NAS Olathe prior to its relocation to Grandview Airport, Missouri, later renamed Richards-Gebaur AFB.

In 1951, the United States Air Force's Air Defense Command selected NAS Olathe as a site for one of twenty-eight radar stations built as part of the second segment of the permanent ADC general radar surveillance network for the United States. Prompted by the start of the Korean War, on 11 July 1950, the Secretary of the Air Force asked the Secretary of Defense for approval to expedite construction of the second segment of the permanent network. The NAS Olathe site was to provide air defense radar coverage of the Kansas City area. The site was to become Olathe Air Force Station, a tenant command aboard NAS Olathe.

Receiving the Defense Secretary's approval on 21 July, the Air Force directed the Army Corps of Engineers to proceed with construction of a radar station on the western part of the ground station, about a mile from the runway and ramp/hangars being used by the Navy. Additional housing units were also constructed at NAS Olathe to accommodate the Air Force personnel.

== See also ==
- Category:Olathe Naval Air Station Clippers football
- Naval Air Station Hutchinson
