= Sweeney School =

- U.S. National Register of Historic Places
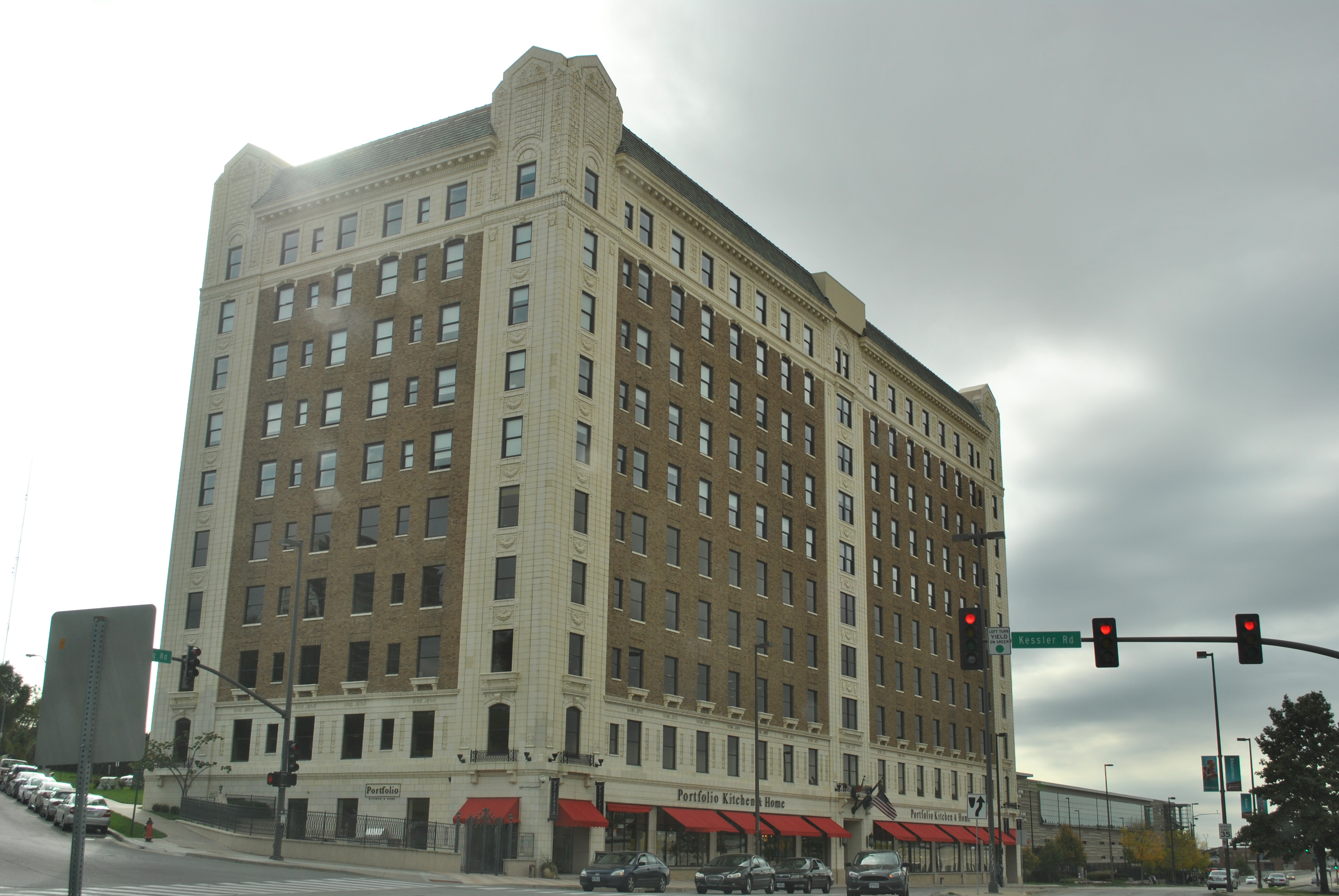
- Sweeney School in 2016

- Location within Missouri Location within the United States
- Location: 215 W. Pershing Rd., Kansas City, Missouri
- Coordinates: 39.083222°N 94.586942°W
- NRHP reference No.: 14000142
- Added to NRHP: April 11, 2014

The Sweeney School was a trade school in Kansas City, Missouri, founded by Emory J. Sweeney in 1908 to use the "Sweeney System" (hands on training) and eventually taught more than a dozen trades, e.g., "Autos, Tractors, and Aviation": Sweeney Automobile School and Sweeney School of Aviation c. 1921. It was added to the National Register of Historic Places in 2014.

== History ==
Enrollment at the Sweeney School grew significantly to train automobile mechanics and radio technicians during World War I. As enrollment increased, the Sweeney School moved south from its 15th Street location to construct a building that would become a Kansas City landmark. Sweeney built the new high-rise school building for his classes directly across from Union Station on Pershing Road in Kansas City, Missouri. The new ten-story building was completed on October 1, 1917. The new building included 12 acres of floor space and had rooms for 800 students to live on site. The building even had a swimming pool in the basement and a motion picture theatre. The new Sweeney School building claimed to contain the largest cafeteria and dining room in the world as well as the largest electric sign in the world on its roof. The electric sign on the roof towered 80 feet above the top of the building and contained five thousand electrical lamps. In 1917, enrollment at the school was 3,674, and by 1919 enrollment had grown to 7,917.

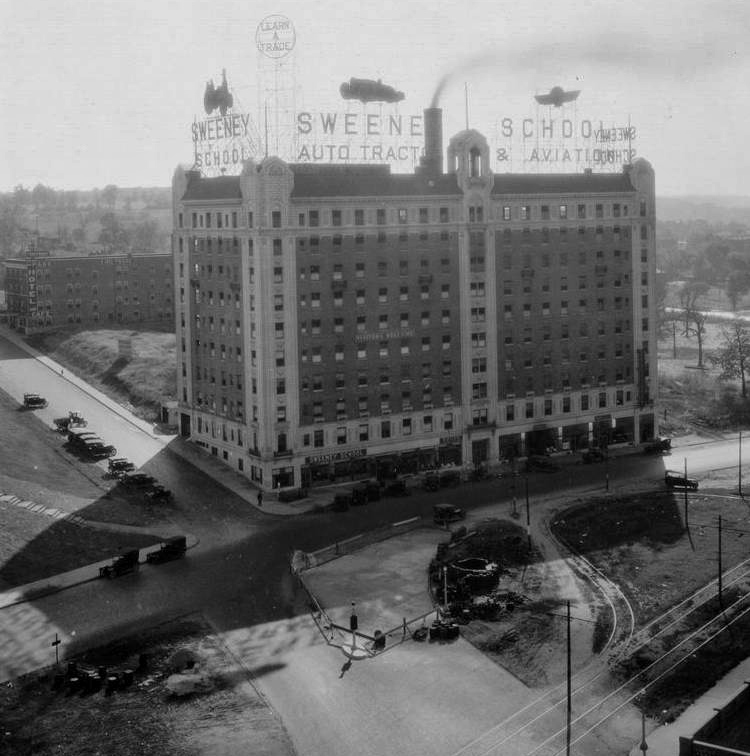
Sweeney School building in 1922

During the 1918 flu pandemic, 2,300 of the 3,000 students enrolled at the school contracted the disease. Fifteen mechanics died between September 29 and October 4. A quarantine was ordered, which proved successful in combating the disease. According to the Missouri Historical Review, "Army officials described the quarantine as a reverse quarantine, because it was designed to protect the Army men from civilians, instead of the opposite."

Financial reverses caused the closing of the school, in these quarters, and on November 8, 1929, the building was acquired by the Businessmen's Assurance company, which renovated and remodeled the structure and used it until the BMA Tower opened in 1963.

The Sweeney building on Pershing Road was purchased in 1999 by developer Dan Clothier. The University of Missouri Kansas City-Institute for Human Development is located on the 4th and 6th floors of the building. Portfolio Kitchen and Home opened a 7,000 square foot showroom in the building in July 2011. The Associated Press has offices on the 2nd floor of the building.

== WHB Radio ==
Radio station WHB was established at the Sweeney Automobile School by Sam Adair and John T. Schilling. The station debuted in April 1922, and it formally gained its license on May 10. WHB may have originally used WOQ's transmitter. The twin towers of WHB on Pershing Road became a well-known Kansas City landmark, along with Sweeney's gaudy "LEARN A TRADE" sign atop his building. With Sweeney liquidating his assets following the 1929 financial crisis, the Cook Paint and Varnish Company acquired WHB from Sweeney on April 4, 1930. The sale was approved by the Federal Radio Commission on April 12, 1930.

== Sweeney School of Aviation ==
In the early 1920s, the Sweeney School added aviation to its training programs. The new Sweeney School of Aviation offered opportunities for students to learn to fly and to learn to repair aircraft. The Sweeney School of Aviation leased a relatively undeveloped airfield in Kansas City, Kansas along the banks of the Missouri River. The airport, known as the Sweeney Airport, opened in 1925 after Sweeney constructed a single hangar-workshop holding approximately 6 planes. When financial troubles later set in for the Sweeney school, the airport was taken over by the Wood Brothers Corporation, renamed the Fairfax Airport. The new airport began operations in April 1929, and it was officially dedicated on August 3 and 4, 1929.
