= Air Force Plant NC =

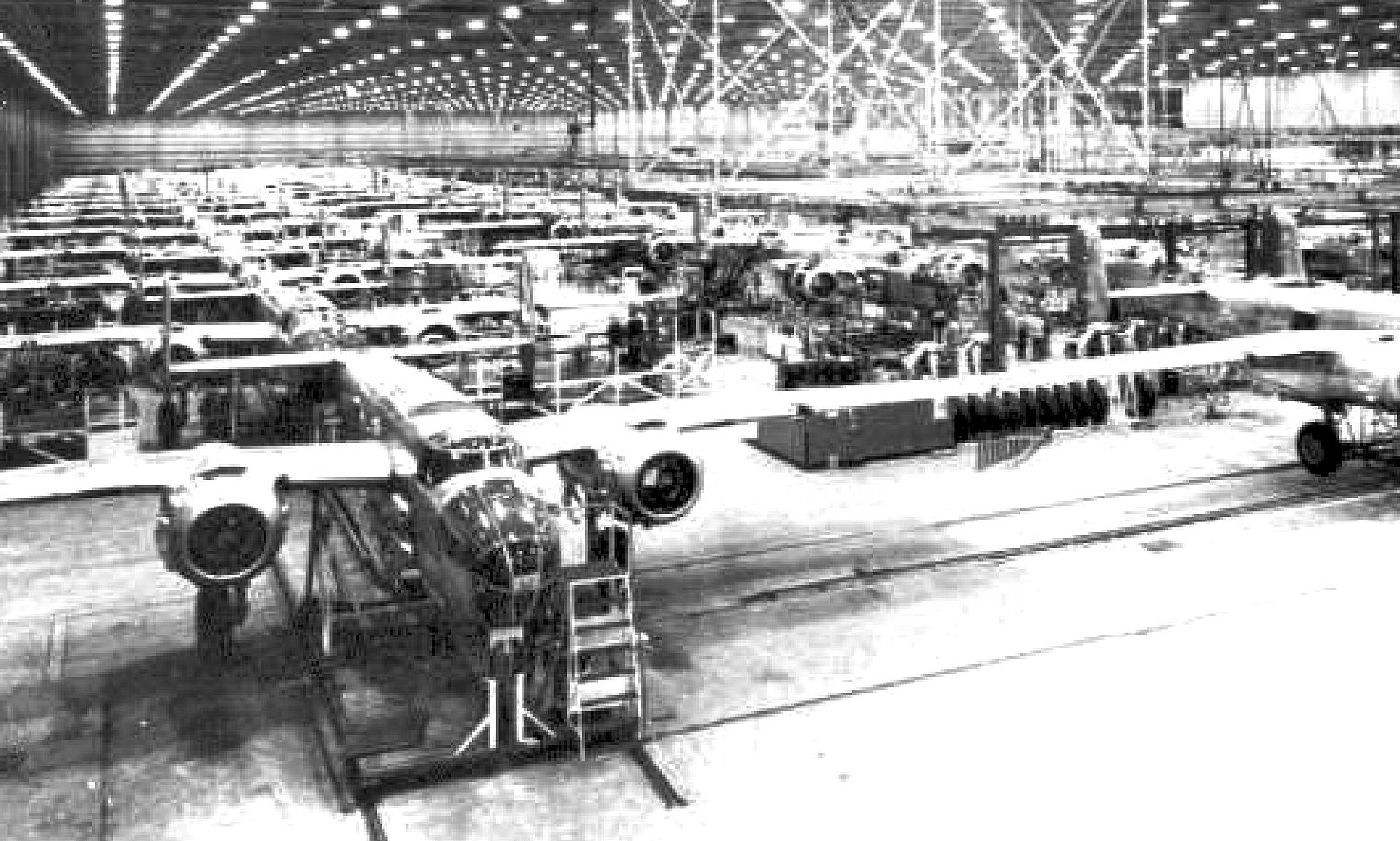
The plant's B-25 Mitchell assembly line in 1944

Air Force Plants NC (NAA-K company ID, Government Assembly Plant No. 2, facility ID #2503) was an aircraft production facility established during World War II adjacent to Fairfax Field near Kansas City. Although operated by North American Aviation, the plant was built and owned by the United States government.

== Background ==
North American Aviation's president had inspected the field by December 1940 when the US government approved construction of a Kansas City production plant to produce B-25 Mitchell bombers for the USAAF and PBJ-1D bombers for the US Navy. Survey work began in December, the city of Kansas City, Kansas, purchased the airport in February, and the plant's groundbreaking was on 8 March 1941. Contract W535 AC 19341 for the initial production of 1,200 B-25D (NA-87) bombers was approved on June 28, 1941; production began in December 1941.

== B-25 production ==
Fairfax's first B-25D was accepted by the USAAF in February 1942 (the first production block was B-25D-1). North American provided parts for the first 100 Fairfax B-25Ds from AFP #09 in Inglewood, California, and the company had a test flight office at Fairfax.

A USAAF Modification Center was built at Fairfax Field from May–October 1942 for altering the plant's B-25s. The plant's "high bay" expansion was completed for a 1942 North American contract (never implemented) to build 200 Boeing B-29 Superfortress bombers at Fairfax alongside B-25 Mitchell. The expansion began in July 1942 on the east side of the bomber plant and added 350 ft × 1,060 ft (110 m × 320 m) of floor space with twice the height of the existing final assembly bay (completed in March 1943). After several outbuildings were added to the modification center, in October 1944 it became an adjunct to the final assembly line.

Employment peaked at 24,329 in October 1943, and the first Fairfax B-25J was accepted in December 1943 (555 B-25Js were in the first production block: B-25J-1-NC.) D model production ended in March 1944 with block 35 (B-25D-35-NA) and after North American's California plant ended B-25 production on July 7, 1944; Fairfax was the sole source for B-25 Mitchells and set a January 1945 record with AAF acceptance of 315 Fairfax aircraft.

Planning for Lockheed P-80 Shooting Star jet fighter production included a visit in February 1945 by two Lockheed representatives, and in April Lockheed shipped a P-80 to the bomber plant for study. Work began on building jigs for P-80 production, space was cleared for P-80 production in the high bay, and the B-25 assembly line was shortened.

B-25J production - which was scheduled to continue through December 1945 - was terminated on August 15, the day after V-J Day. Fairfax had built 2,290 B-25Ds (152 Navy PBJ-1D variants) and 4,318 B-25Js of the ~11,000 produced. The federal Reconstruction Finance Corporation set up a depot in the Fairfax district to liquidate war surplus not sent to depots or elsewhere for government use (reusable materials like aluminum and steel were reclaimed.) Seventy-two incomplete but flyable B-25Js were sold to the public.

== Buick-Oldsmobile-Pontiac Assembly Plant ==
The Buick-Oldsmobile-Pontiac Assembly Plant adjacent to Fairfax Field, was initiated with the "November 7, 1945 [announcement] that General Motors had signed a five-year lease for the former bomber plant" which had several interior railroad spurs from the north. "The reconverted factory finished its first automobile in June 1946", and in 1953 when the Republic F-84F Thunderstreak fighter was unveiled, its assembly line was in the same 53 acres (21 ha) building as the automotive production line.

General Motors produced 599 F-84Fs at the Fairfax plant; the aircraft and vehicle production lines running parallel simultaneously. GM purchased the plant in 1960. In 1985 production started in the new General Motors Fairfax Assembly Plant built on runways of the closed municipal airport. Production at the former Air Force Plant ceased in May 1987 and the structure was razed in 1989.

External images
- 1st B-25 completed at Fairfax
