= Emory J. Sweeney =

Emory John Sweeney
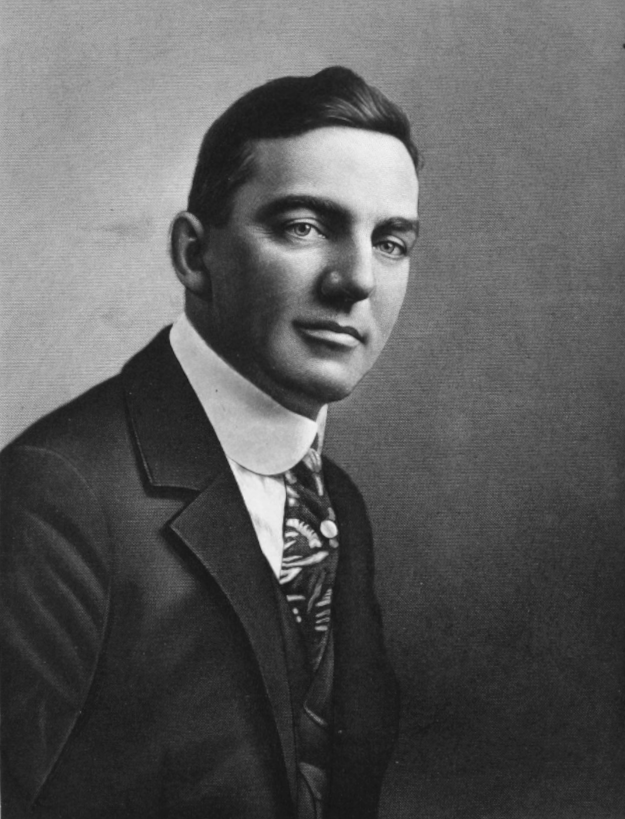
- Born: December 23, 1883; Chicago, Illinois
- Died: October 17, 1953 (aged 69); Kansas City, Missouri
- Occupations: Businessman, developer
- Spouses: Mary C. Smith (m. 1905, died) Virginia R. Kossuth (m. 1918)
- Children: 9

Signature
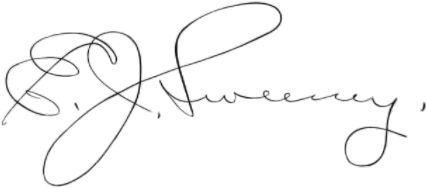

Emory J. Sweeney (December 23, 1883 - October 17, 1953), better known as E. J. Sweeney, was the founder and president of the Sweeney Automobile School in Kansas City, Missouri. E. J. Sweeney also developed the Santa Fe Hills neighborhood in South Kansas City.

== Early life ==
Sweeney was born in Chicago, Illinois, on December 23, 1883, to John M. Sweeney and Mary (Connell) Sweeney. John Sweeney was a native of Canada, and he was a successful cattle dealer. His business in cattle brought the Sweeney family to Kansas City, Missouri. After high school. E. J. Sweeney worked with his father in the cattle industry for a few years until he became a mechanic in an automobile repair shop where his wage was 25 dollars per week. While working as a mechanic, he developed the idea of founding a school to teach men to operate and repair automobiles.

== Real estate development ==
In the 1920s, Sweeney purchased a tract of land known as Indian Village in the southern portion of Kansas City from William Rockhill Nelson. The land was located between Wornall Road and Holmes south of 85th Street. Sweeney's vision was to "make it easy for the home-loving man to own his own place in Indian Village that he never again can truthfully say that he has not had the opportunity to start on the way toward owning his own home." Sweeney changed the name of the neighborhood to Santa Fe Hills. Amenities in Santa Fe Hills included "rock roads, sidewalks, water, electric lights, telephone service, and a community interest in the Club House, a Town Hall, an open air theater, ten thousand dollar chimes, a baseball diamond, football field, tennis courts, swimming pool, and well equipped playgrounds." The Santa Fe Hills neighborhood still includes a road named for E. J. Sweeney: Sweeney Boulevard.

== Personal life ==
In 1905, Sweeney married Mary C. Smith, and the couple had nine children. Following the death of his first wife, Sweeney married Virginia R. Kossuth in 1918. In 1919, Sweeney constructed a large home for his family at 59th Street Terrace and Ward Parkway. With nine children living at home, the house at 5921 Ward Parkway was designed with a focus on use by children. The oversize lot contained a large playground, and the third floor included a series of comparatively small bedrooms for the children. Amid financial troubles, Sweeney sold the mansion to lumberman Harry Dierks in 1929.

He died at his home in Kansas City on October 17, 1953.
