= Fairfax Assembly & Stamping =

Automobile assembly plant in the US

Coordinates: 39°08′50″N 94°36′12″W

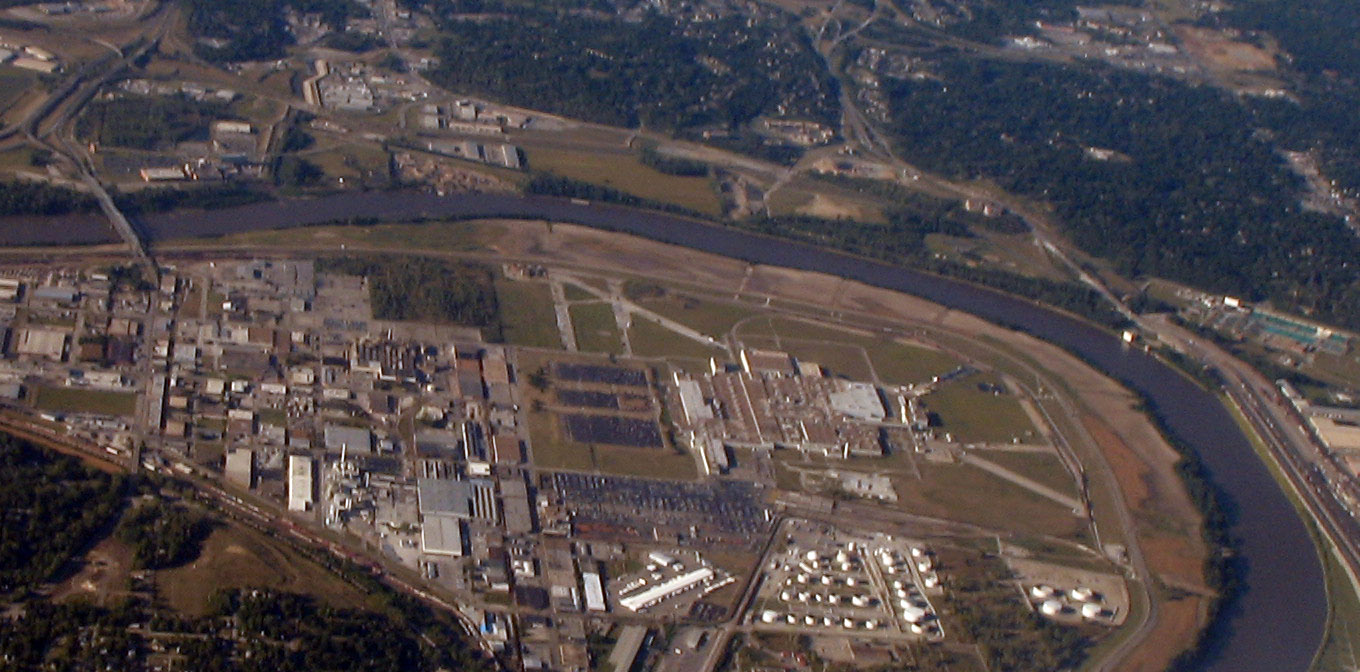
- The south side of the plant is surrounded by the old airport runway.
- Operated: 1987–present
- Location: 3201 Fairfax Trafficway; Kansas City, Kansas
- Industry: Automotive
- Products: Automobiles
- Employees: ~2,234
- Area: 572 acres (2.31 km^{2})
- Volume: 4,900,000 sq ft (460,000 m^{2})
- Owner: General Motors
- Website: www.gm.com/our-company/manufacturing/fairfax-assembly

Fairfax Assembly & Stamping is a General Motors (GM) automobile manufacturing facility in Kansas City, Kansas. The site was originally a World War II bomber plant, and has a comprehensive history of producing vehicles for numerous GM brands. It exclusively assembled the critically-acclaimed Saturn Aura, the 2007 Motor Trend Car of the Year.

The 4,900,000 sq ft (460,000 m^{2}) plant employs over 2,200 hourly and salaried employees, who are represented by United Auto Workers Local 31.

For many years, the plant was a key producer of GM's mid-size sedans, including the long-running Chevrolet Malibu. Following an industry-wide shift away from sedans, the plant became central to GM's evolving manufacturing strategy, undergoing retooling to produce the popular Chevrolet Equinox SUV.

== History ==
=== Fairfax I (1945–1987) ===
The original Fairfax assembly plant was located next to Fairfax Airport, the former location of the North American Bomber Production Plant where the B-25 Mitchell was manufactured during World War II. After the war, GM purchased the building and converted it to an automobile assembly plant under the management of GM's newly created Buick-Oldsmobile-Pontiac Assembly Division. In 1952, alongside car production, the plant produced F-84F jet-powered fighters.

=== Fairfax II (1987–present) ===
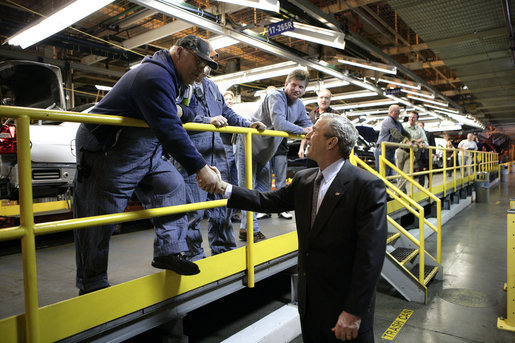
President George W. Bush shook hands with Fairfax assembly line workers on March 20, 2007.

The original Fairfax plant ceased production in May 1987, and production was moved to the newly constructed Fairfax II. The new plant was developed on the grounds of the former Fairfax Airport in a project reported to cost $1 billion. The new plant began production with the 1988 model year Pontiac Grand Prix. On August 23, 2005, the Fairfax facility built its 10 millionth car.

The plan to build the next-generation Chevrolet Bolt EV and add production of the gasoline-powered Chevrolet Equinox was confirmed as part of the 2023 UAW-GM national labor agreement, placing Fairfax at the forefront of the company's dual-track strategy for EVs and traditional vehicles.

The UAW's 2023 "Stand Up Strike" did not initially target the plant, but Fairfax was idled on September 20, 2023, due to a parts shortage from the striking Wentzville Assembly plant, resulting in the temporary layoff of about 2,000 workers. The 46-day national strike concluded with a historic contract that included a 25% general wage increase over its 4.5-year life, the reinstatement of cost-of-living adjustments (COLA), and the elimination of the tiered wage system. The agreement secured the plant's future by allocating production of the next-generation Bolt EV and Equinox to Fairfax. The workforce is represented by UAW Local 31.

The Aura was a cornerstone of GM's effort to revitalize Saturn by shedding its image of building small, practical cars and competing directly with popular mid-size sedans like the Honda Accord and Toyota Camry. The Aura was built on the global GM Epsilon platform, which it shared with the Chevrolet Malibu, and it was praised by critics for its European-inspired design and driving dynamics. Its critical acclaim peaked when it was named the 2007 Motor Trend Car of the Year, a major achievement that brought significant positive attention to both the brand and the quality of production at the Fairfax facility. The Aura's production ceased not due to its own merits, but as a result of GM's decision to discontinue the entire Saturn brand during its 2009 bankruptcy and restructuring.

The end of Chevrolet Malibu production in November 2024 represented a shift in GM's manufacturing strategy within a larger industry trend of phasing out traditional sedans in favor of SUVs and EVs. GM confirmed the move was necessary to retool the Fairfax facility for the next-generation Bolt EV and the upcoming Equinox, swapping a legacy sedan for new electric technology and a high-demand compact SUV.

== Products ==
=== Upcoming ===
- Chevrolet Equinox (2027–)
- Buick Envision (2028–)

=== Current ===
- Chevrolet Bolt (2026–present)

=== Past ===
- 1988–2003 Pontiac Grand Prix
- 1996–1997 Oldsmobile Cutlass Supreme
- 1998–2002 Oldsmobile Intrigue
- 2007–2010 Saturn Aura: It was built exclusively at Fairfax, with total U.S. sales of 19,746 (2006), 59,964 (2007), 59,380 (2008), and 21,395 (2009).
- 2010–2016 Buick LaCrosse
- 2004–2024 Chevrolet Malibu: A high-volume product for the plant, with U.S. sales in its final full year of production at 130,341 (2023).
- 2019–2025 Cadillac XT4
