= List of United States Army Air Force modification centers =

United States Army Air Forces Modification Centers were World War II facilities at which military aircraft underwent post-production changes in order to modify or install equipment needed for specific roles or theaters of operation. The majority of newly produced combat aircraft were channeled to the modification centers immediately after leaving the production facility, and before departing to the active theaters of war. The use of modification centers avoided disruption to the production lines to incorporate continuous improvements or other changes to the aircraft design. They were the only "set of field installations" constructed for Material Command. Modification Centers were for:

"the tailoring job of the AAF which fills the gap between the time we decide on an alteration of a plan and the time the factory can incorporate the change into production. To modification centers, operated by contract by commercial airline companies and manufacturers, go most of our airplanes before shipment overseas. Here they are modernized with the newest equipment available. Planes also are dressed up or stripped down according to the military requirements and weather conditions of the theater for which they are destined. Modification is continued on operational aircraft by service personnel in the theaters, where many modification ideas originate."

== Sites ==
During 1942, 21 modification centers were activated, "eight being operated by commercial airlines and the remainder by aircraft manufacturers. Nineteen of the centers remained in operation at the end of the year after two other centers had been closed out":

- Atlanta, Georgia (Eastern Airlines)
- Atlanta, Georgia (Delta Air Lines)
- Birmingham, Alabama (Betchel, McCone, and Parsons)
- Brownsville, Texas, Texas (Pan American)
- Buffalo, New York (Curtiss Aircraft)
- Cheyenne, Wyoming (United Air Lines)
- Dallas Love Field in Dallas, Texas (Lockheed Aircraft)
- Daggett, California (Douglas Aircraft)
- Denver, Colorado (Continental Airlines)
- Evansville, Indiana (Republic Aviation)
- Fairfax Field in Kansas City, Kansas (North American Aviation Kansas) (Note: Built from May–October 1942 for altering new B-25 Mitchells from the nearby Air Force Plant NC, Fairfax's center was a dual hangar of timber frame on the south edge of the airfield near the Missouri River (some alterations were performed on the airport apron). A west extension and several outbuildings were added to the modification center and in October 1944, it became an adjunct to the final assembly line. Post-war, "Transcontinental and Western Air leased the modification center" for servicing airliners.)
- Kansas City, Missouri (Transcontinental and Western Airlines) (Note: Across the river from the Fairfax B-25 modification center.)
- Long Beach, California (Douglas Aircraft) (Note: Long Beach, CA, Douglas is listed in Appex. 3, AAF Study 62. The site modified 1,395 aircraft in 1944, including 66 B-17; 34 A-26 and C-47 for the AAF (1,238), and China (12).)
- Louisville, Kentucky (Convair)
- Louisville, Kentucky (Curtiss Aircraft)
- Memphis, Tennessee (Southern Airlines)
- Niagara Falls, New York (Bell Aircraft, Buffalo)
- Oklahoma City, Oklahoma (Douglas Aircraft)
- Omaha, Nebraska (Martin Aircraft)
- St. Paul, Minnesota (Northwest Airlines)
- Tucson, Arizona (Convair Aircraft)
- Tulsa, Oklahoma (Douglas Aircraft)
- Vandalia, Ohio (Northwest Air Lines) (Note: The Northwest Airlines facility at Vandalia. OH is listed in Appendix 3, 1944 Modification Summary to AAF Study 62. The site modified four AT-6 aircraft.)

Depots, e.g., Fairfield, Ohio (FAD), did modifications but were not modification centers.

The commercial modification centers were distinct from the USAAF Air Service Command domestic depot system, which also performed modification as an addition mission function. There were four major depots in the system which expanded to about a dozen during the war. The depots had sub-depots and auxiliary locations. There were also major overseas depot and sub-depot systems which predated addition modifications to combat aircraft.

== See also ==
- List of United States Air Force plants
