= Bérénice Chouteau =

American pioneer

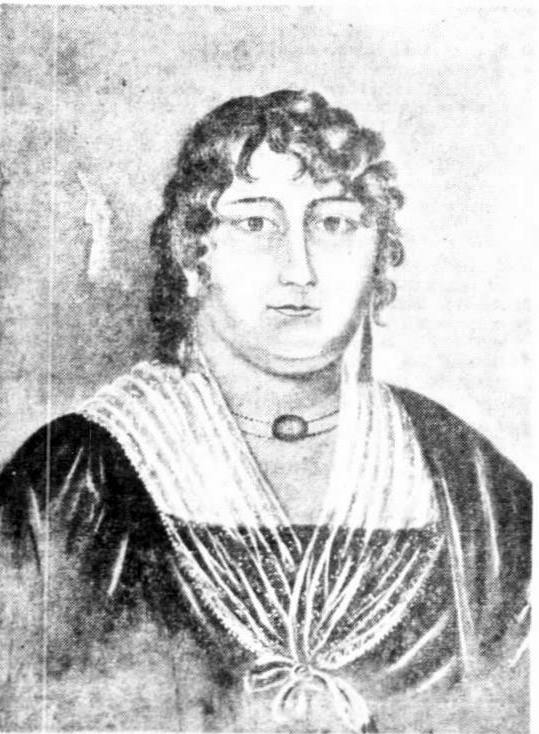
- Berenice Thérèse Menard Chouteau
- Born: Berenice Thérèse Menard c. 1801; Kaskaskia, Illinois, U.S.
- Died: November 20, 1888 (aged 87); Kansas City, Missouri, U.S.
- Resting place: Calvary Cemetery, St. Louis, Missouri, U.S.
- Known for: Co-founder of Kansas City, Missouri
- Spouse: François Chouteau
- Children: 9
- Parents: Pierre Menard; Marie Therese Michelle Godin

Berenice Thérèse Menard Chouteau (c. 1801 – November 20, 1888) was a French-American pioneer who is widely regarded as a co-founder of what became Kansas City, Missouri. In 1821, she and her husband, François Chouteau, established the first permanent European-American settlement in that remote area of Wild West frontier at the confluence of great rivers. She was the daughter of Illinois's first lieutenant governor, Pierre Menard, and she had married into the powerful Chouteau family dynasty that dominated the North American fur trade.

François managed the commercial aspects of Chouteau's Post, and Berenice transformed the area into a livable community called Chouteau's Town. She recruited Father Bernard Donnelly and other French-speaking families to the area, establishing the French Bottoms as a distinct cultural and social hub on the frontier. As a devout Catholic, she was the primary "liberal benefactress" for the settlement's first church, a log chapel that was the direct predecessor of the modern Cathedral of the Immaculate Conception.

After her husband's death in 1838, Chouteau chose to remain the frontier community's matriarch for the next fifty years. She further demonstrated what was regarded as profound resilience after the Great Flood of 1844 destroyed her riverfront home, relocating to the blufftop portion of Chouteau's Town that was slowly assimilated into the village called Kansas, which was incorporated in 1850 as the Town of Kansas and eventually Kansas City. She was a significant landowner and central figure among the elite of Kansas, and engaged in a long and ultimately unsuccessful legal battle to defend her family's large and pioneering land claims. The city's status as violent Civil War battleground prompted her voluntary exile. She returned to Kansas City and remained a prominent citizen and patron of the Catholic Church, also outliving all of her children.

François and Bérénice Chouteau became the first permanent pioneers of the wild frontier that became the nucleus of Kansas City, Missouri: East Bottoms, West Bottoms, River Market, and Quality Hill. The Martin City Telegraph summarized, "This early commerce on the western side of Missouri was launched when a newly-married couple took a risk by settling on the edge of the frontier." The New York Times called her "perhaps the most noted historic character of Western Missouri—the link connecting the past with the present". Her life connected the region's early French Creole fur-trading era to the rise of Kansas City. Contemporary leaders called her the "Mother of Kansas City", the "Grande Dame of Kansas City", and "the soul of the colony".

== Early life and family ==
Berenice Thérèse Menard was born c. 1801 in Kaskaskia, Illinois, a center of French Creole culture, which retained its French language, customs, and Catholic faith under U.S. governance. Older biographical sources state her birth year as 1801, which is consistent with her being 18 at her 1819 marriage, and some modern institutions state 1808. She was a daughter of Pierre Menard, a wealthy fur trader and the first Lieutenant Governor of Illinois, and of his first wife, Marie Therese Michelle Godin, who died when Chouteau was four.

Her upbringing afforded practical skills beyond those of many women of her time. In addition to literacy in French, she learned to manage a large frontier household, ride horses, and handle a small boat on the Kaskaskia River. She grew up playing with Native American children, giving her a cross-cultural familiarity that was rare for a white woman of her era.

== Founding of Kansas City ==
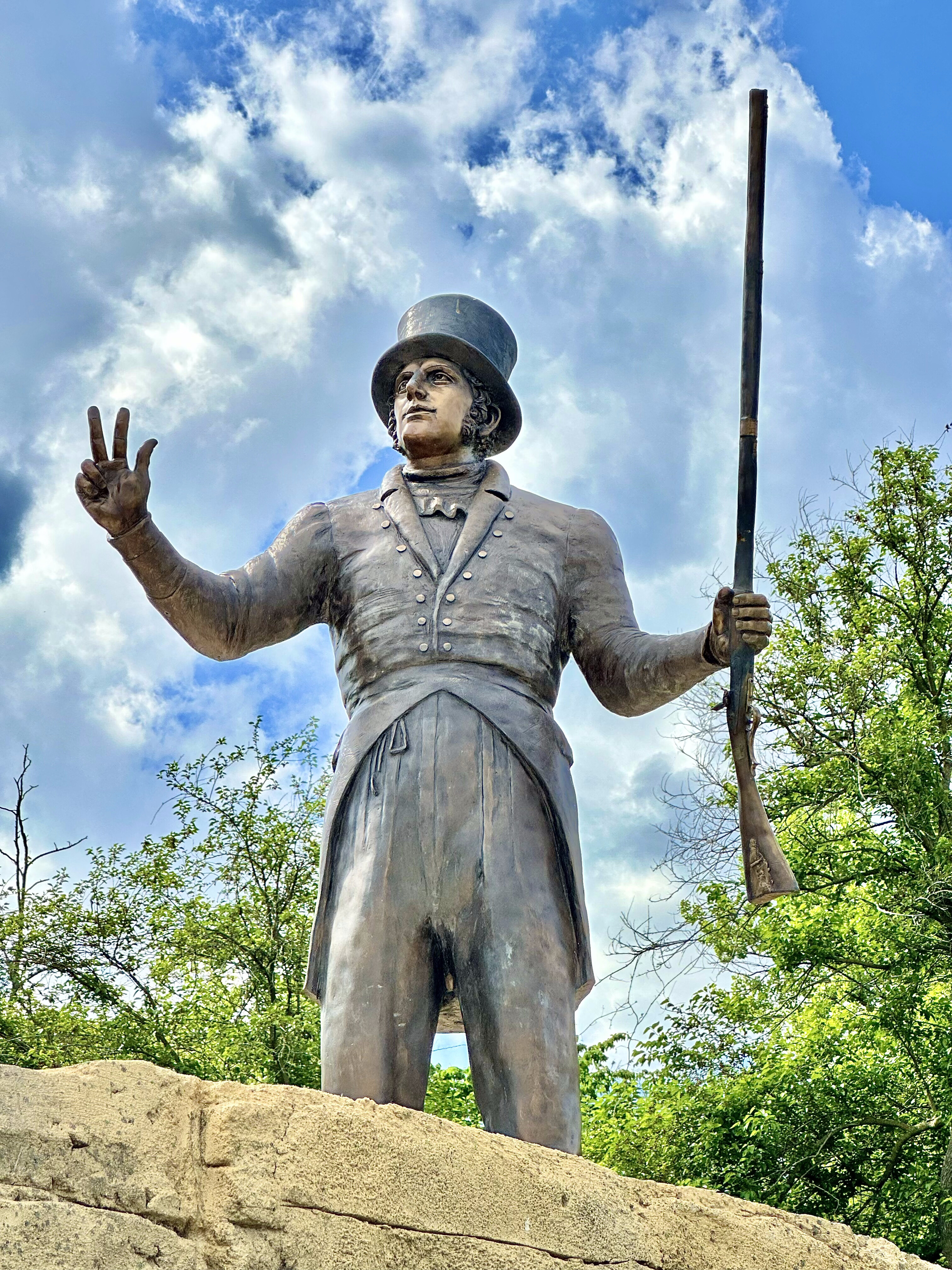
A sculpture of her husband François Chouteau is at the Chouteau Heritage Fountain.

In a strategic union of two powerful frontier families, at 18 years old, she married the 22-year-old fur trader François Chouteau on July 12, 1819. He was a son of Jean Pierre Chouteau and a key member of the Chouteau fur-trading dynasty, which partnered with John Jacob Astor's American Fur Company. Their honeymoon was a 60-day business expedition by keelboat up the Missouri River to scout a location for a new trading post.

In 1821, they returned to a site near the confluence of the Kansas and Missouri rivers to establish a permanent post. Their home was described as a spacious, double-pen log structure with two wings. The arrival of this woman and her children signaled the settlement's permanence. As the first known white woman to settle this immediate area, Chouteau was instrumental in recruiting other French-speaking families. Visitors noted the settlement's "joyful 'Frenchness'", with a cultural atmosphere of camaraderie, music, and dancing that the Chouteaus cultivated. Their home was the region's social and political hub, where she hosted government agents, explorers, and new settlers.

As devout Roman Catholics, the Chouteaus were the primary benefactors for the settlement's first church. In 1835, a log chapel named St. Francis Regis, and popularly nicknamed Chouteau's Church, was built on a blufftop site. Its direct successor in the same location is the gold-domed Cathedral of the Immaculate Conception, and its original cemetery was exhumed to St. Mary's cemetery located across the city.

== Widowhood and later life ==
In 1838, François Chouteau was trampled to death by horses during a trading expedition. Widowed with several children, his wife chose to remain on the rugged frontier rather than retreat to the comfort of St. Louis society. This solidified her role as the community's consummate matriarch. In her later years, she became known as the "Grande Dame of Kansas City" and the "Mother of Kansas City". She endured significant hardship, outliving all nine of her children.

She continued to operate the family's trading interests and later ran a retail store. After six years as a widow, the Great Flood of 1844 destroyed her riverfront farm and warehouse, along with the entire French Bottoms settlement, which was reportedly completely reforested by 1855. The flood forced an immediate relocation. Most original settlers moved away, and Chouteau joined the fledgling settlement taking shape on the blufftop. This community was informally called Kansas since an 1838 land purchase. She established a new residence on Pearl Street, a short lane along the bluff's crest that offered superb vistas and immediately became the first elite residential area. Her neighbors included founders John Calvin McCoy, William M. Chick, and John Campbell, reestablishing her place at the center of the new town's leadership. Chick noted of her home: "Here was another place where hospitality was dealt with a lavish hand. Inherent French politeness and wealth characterized the entertainment. The house was always full of gaiety and good cheer." This exclusive enclave was noted for its large mansions and a pro-Southern social circle where the area's first Confederate flag stood.

A defining feature of Chouteau's long widowhood was a legal battle to defend her family's land claims from squatters. The "long and expensive litigation" ultimately failed just two weeks before her death, when the courts ruled against her based on statutes of limitation. She nonetheless remained a significant landowner for decades. In 1855, she sold a 110-acre (45 ha) tract of her property to developer Kersey Coates. He platted the upland portion of this land into what became the separate Quality Hill neighborhood. The remainder of the tract, located in the West Bottoms, was reserved for industrial use.

The brutal guerrilla warfare along the Kansas-Missouri border during the American Civil War, culminating in the Battle of Westport, forced her into a voluntary exile for her safety in 1864. She resided in the French Creole community of Ste. Genevieve, Missouri and her native Kaskaskia, Illinois, returning to Kansas City in 1867.

She continued to be a significant financial patron of the Catholic Church, described as a "liberal benefactress" who "distributed her large fortune in promoting the interests of the... church".

A family legend told by her granddaughter after her death, holds that she destroyed the only portrait ever made of her, as she could not stand for an image of herself to exist when there was none of her late husband.

== Children ==
François and Bérénice Chouteau (m. 1819) had nine children:

- Edmond François Chouteau, b. 1821 in St. Louis–d. 1853 in Jackson County, Missouri
- Pierre Menard Chouteau, b. 1822 in St. Louis–d. 1885 in Jackson County, Missouri
- Louis Amédée Chouteau, b. 1825 in St. Louis–d. 1827 in St. Louis
- Louis Sylvestre Chouteau, b. 1827 in St. Louis–d. 1829 in St. Louis
- Benjamin Chouteau, b. 1828 in St. Louis–d. 1871 in St. Louis
- Frederick D. Chouteau, b. 1831 in Independence, Missouri–d. after 1870
- Benedict Pharamond Chouteau, b. 1833 in Jackson County, Missouri–d. 1834 in St. Louis
- Mary Brigite Chouteau, b. 1835 in Jackson County, Missouri–d. 1864 in St. Louis
- Thérèse Odile Chouteau, b. 1837 in Jackson County, Missouri–d. 1837 in Jackson County

== Death ==
She died in Kansas City on November 20, 1888. Her Pearl Street home stood vacant long after her death. Squatters moved in and began to disassemble it, and finally a wrecker purchased what remained for $25 (equivalent to $800 in 2025) and hauled it away for scrap. The tiny Pearl Street neighborhood was eventually obliterated to improve commercial access to the riverfront and became part of the modern River Market neighborhood.

== Legacy ==
The New York Times eulogized her as "perhaps the most noted historic character of Western Missouri—the link connecting the past with the present". Her resilience and her work in establishing a cultural and social foundation for the community secured her legacy as the "Mother of Kansas City".

François and Bérénice Chouteau became the first permanent American pioneers of the wild frontier that became Kansas City, Missouri. The Martin City Telegraph summarized their impact: "This early commerce on the western side of Missouri was launched when a newly-married couple took a risk by settling on the edge of the frontier. The future of fur trading in western Missouri would be directly connected to them, and Kansas City likely wouldn't have developed without the Chouteau’s enterprising spirit."

To commemorate the foundational trading relationship between the Chouteau family and the regional tribes, the Osage Nation partnered with Kansas City to create the Chouteau Heritage Fountain, dedicated in 2021. It is located in the River North neighborhood, near the site of their original post and modern namesakes, the Chouteau Bridge and Chouteau Trafficway.
