= Chouteau =

French-American family

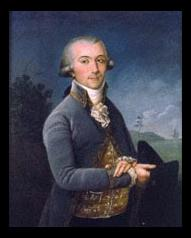
Pierre Laclede, ca. 1810

Chouteau is a highly-successful French Creole furtrading family based in St. Louis, Missouri.

Their ancestors Chouteau and Laclède initially settled in New Orleans. They then moved up the Mississippi River and established posts in the Midwest and Western United States, particularly along the Missouri River and in the Southwest. They co-founded St. Louis and Kansas City, Missouri. Many locations were named after the family.

== People ==
- Marie-Therese Bourgeois Chouteau (1733–1814), matriarch of the family

children of Marie-Therèse Bourgeois Chouteau and René Augustin Chouteau Sr.

- René Auguste Chouteau (1750–1829), founder of St. Louis, Missouri

- Auguste Aristide Chouteau (1792–1833), fur trader
- Henri Chouteau I (1805–1855), railroad executive, killed in Gasconade Bridge train disaster

- Henri Chouteau II (1830–1854), married Julia Deaver

- Azby Auguste Chouteau Sr. (1853–?), lawyer and one of the founders of Minnesela, South Dakota, husband of Cora Baker (great-great-granddaughter of Isaac Shelby)

- Azby Chouteau Jr. (1884–?)
- Henri Arminstead Chouteau III (1889–1952), realtor

- Edward Chouteau (1807–1846), trader
- Gabriel Chouteau (1794–1887), served in War of 1812
- Eulalie Chouteau (1799–1835), married René Paul (1783–1851), first surveyor of St. Louis

- Gabriel René Paul (1813–1886), Union Army general in the American Civil War

- Louise Chouteau, married Gabriel Paul
- Emilie Chouteau, married Thomas Floyd, US officer in the Black Hawk War

Children of Marie-Therèse Bourgeois Chouteau and Pierre Laclède (also founder of St. Louis, Missouri):

- Victoire Chouteau, (1760–1825), wife of Charles Gratiot Sr., financier of the Illinois campaign during the American Revolutionary War

- Charles Gratiot, (1786–1855), builder of Fort Meigs and Fort Monroe and participant in Battle of Mackinac Island
- Henry Gratiot (1789–1856), soldier in the Black Hawk War

- Adèle Gratiot (1826–1887), wife of Elihu B. Washburne (1816–1887), U.S. Secretary of State and U.S. Ambassador to France

- Jean Pierre Chouteau (1758–1849)

- Auguste Pierre Chouteau (1786–1838), founder of posts in Oklahoma and Chouteau, Oklahoma

- Emilie Sophie Chouteau (1813–1874), wife of Nicolas DeMenil and owner of Chatillon-DeMenil House

- Pierre Chouteau Jr., nicknamed Cadet, (1789–1865), founder of posts on Upper Missouri River, including Fort Pierre and Chouteau County, Montana, and partner to Bernard A. Pratte in the Pratte & Chouteau Trading Company.
- François Chouteau and Bérénice Chouteau, first European-American pioneers of Kansas City, Missouri

- Yvonne Chouteau (1929–2016), 20th-century Shawnee classical ballerina, one of the "Five Moons" of Oklahoma; 5th-generation descendant of Jean Pierre Chouteau

- Marie Pelagie Chouteau (1760–1812), grandmother of Emilie Pratt, wife of Ramsay Crooks (1780-1859), General Manager and President of the American Fur Company and business partner of Jean Pierre Chouteau

== Places ==
- Choteau, Montana
- Chouteau County, Montana
- Chouteau, Oklahoma
- Chouteau Creek, Mayes County, Oklahoma
- Pierre, South Dakota (named for Pierre Chouteau Jr.)
- Chouteau Bridge and Chouteau Trafficway across the Missouri River in Kansas City, Missouri
- Chouteau's Town surrounded Chouteau's Landing, as some of the first names of what became Kansas City, Missouri
- Chouteau's Landing in St. Louis
- Chouteau Avenue in St. Louis

The family sold the Chouteau posts along the upper Missouri River in 1865 after the American Civil War to Americans James B. Hubbell, Alpheus F. Hawley, James A. Smith, C. Francis Bates. Hubbell, based in Minnesota, already had some licenses from the federal government to trade with Native Americans in the West. He and his colleague Hawley formed a partnership with these men to set up a business. They formed the Northwestern Fur Company and operated it through posts along the upper Missouri River until 1870. They closed the business due to losses of equipment and furs during the Sioux uprising and warfare during the 1860s, which resulted in a volatile environment that made it too difficult to operate.
