= French Bottoms =

European-American-tribal settlement

- Area
  - Coordinates: 39°06′45″N 94°36′01″W
- Historical era: American frontier
  - Founded by François and Bérénice Chouteau: 1821; 205 years ago
  - Great Flood of 1844: July 17, 1844; 182 years ago
Preceded by	Succeeded by
Osage Nation	Kansas, Missouri
- Today part of: Kansas City, Missouri

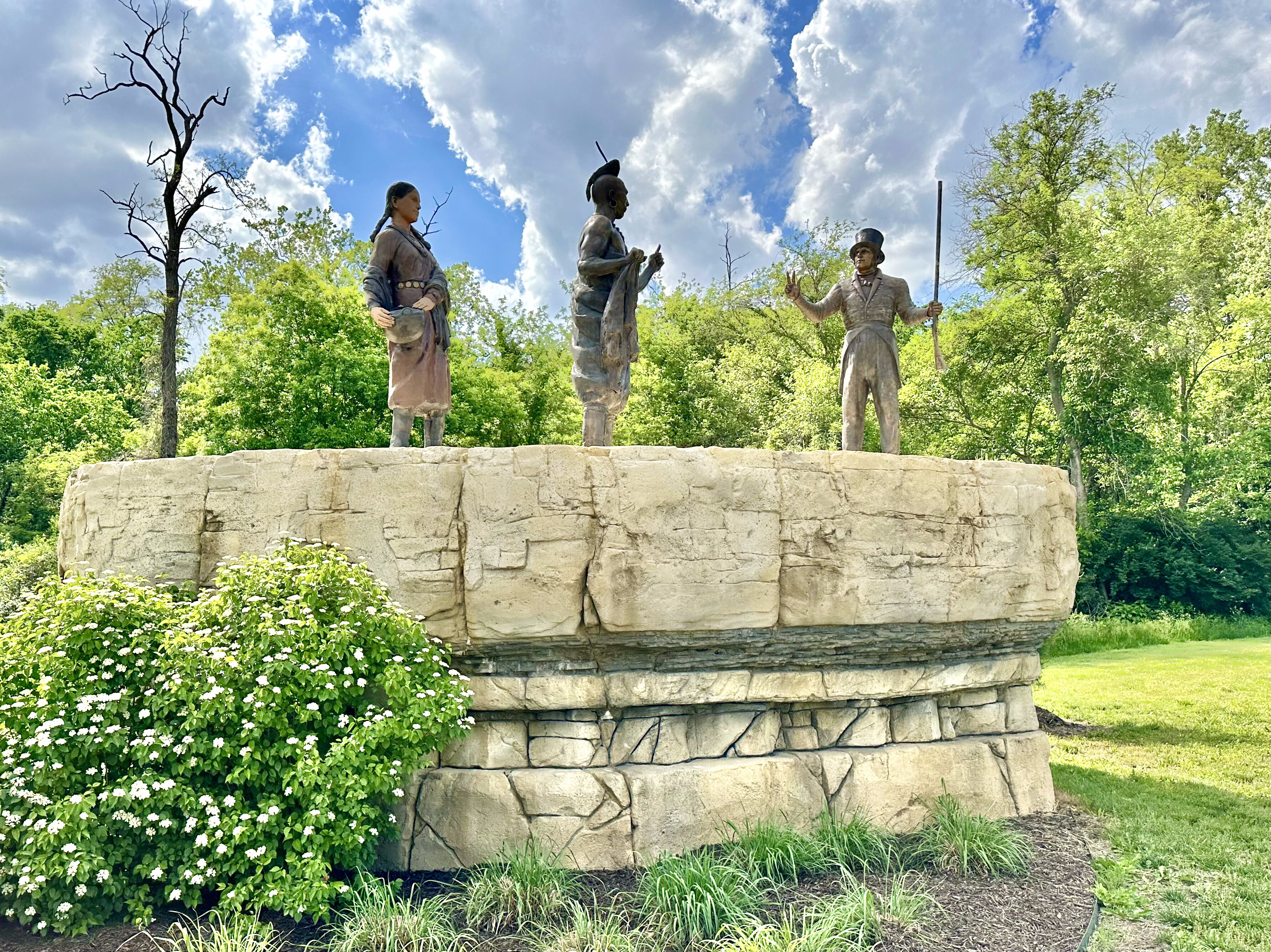
The Osage Nation trades with François Chouteau at the Chouteau Heritage Fountain.

French Bottoms, originally with the French name Chez les Cansès (lit. "at the place of the Kansa"), and the lowland part of Chouteau's Town, was the first permanent European-American settlement in the area that became Kansas City, Missouri. It was founded by the French Creole trader François Chouteau and his wife Bérénice Chouteau as a fur trading post for the American Fur Company. The enterprise began in 1821 as the newlyweds' honeymoon was spent scouting the Missouri River for land to build their first trading post, eventually establishing the main settlement in the alluvial floodplain, or bottoms, near the confluence of the Missouri and Kansas Rivers.

This French-speaking enclave was populated by families of French and mixed French-Native American heritage, extending the French Creole culture of the Mississippi River Valley to the frontier. The community's culture was distinct from that of the later American settlers, featuring unique architecture such as poteaux-en-terre homes and a land parcel design based on the French colonial long-lot system rather than the American square grid. Social life revolved around communal events, including weekly dances (bals) and traditional songs (chansons). A traveler from 1841 recalled how "the tasty pot de bouillon and friendly cup of wine went round and the chansons and fiddles and laughter rang out."

The Great Flood of 1844 completely obliterated the French Bottoms, washing away every home and farm, and permanently erasing the floodplain community. Led by widow Bérénice Chouteau, the survivors abandoned the bottoms and relocated permanently to the highland blufftop part of Chouteau's Town, centered around the church and the Chouteau warehouses. The former French Bottoms, Chouteau's Town, and the fledgling American settlement called Kansas all overlapped, and in 1850 were united as the newly incorporated Town of Kansas. This included renaming the former French Bottoms to West Bottoms and East Bottoms. Bérénice's new house on Pearl Street and major sale of land spanning the western bottoms and bluff to developer Kersey Coates enabled him to create the Quality Hill neighborhood, directly linking the old settlement's leadership to the foundation of the modern city.

The historical French Bottoms is considered the direct progenitor from which Kansas City grew. The former French Bottoms was eventually redeveloped into a major industrial and transportation hub including the Northeast Industrial District. The site of Chouteau's original 1821 north-bank trading post is commemorated by the François Chouteau & Native American Heritage Monument on Chouteau Trafficway near the Chouteau Bridge.

== History ==
=== Geology ===
The French Bottoms was situated on a landscape defined by its geology. The area's nearly flat-lying limestone and shale bedrock, deposited during the Pennsylvanian Period, was fundamentally reshaped during the Pleistocene epoch. A continental glacier fundamentally reshaped the region's river system. The advancing ice sheet shifted the path of a preglacial river, forcing the modern Missouri River into a new channel that turns abruptly from southbound to eastbound at its confluence with the Kansas River. Continental glaciers scoured the bedrock, carving deep troughs and altering drainage patterns. As the glaciers retreated, they deposited immense volumes of meltwater and sediment (sand, silt, and clay), which filled the valleys and created the vast, flat, and fertile alluvial floodplain of the Missouri and Kansas rivers. Particular bluffs (which became part of Chouteau's Town and then the Kansas townsite) were additionally topped by a massive cap of wind-blown glacial soil that raised those bluffs another 120 feet (37 m) over the rock ledge. The bluffs are safer than flat riverbottoms for permanent structures, though forcing a human challenge of navigating their sharp hills and ravines.

This geological process created the exceptionally rich soil that attracted settlers to the riverbottoms, but also an inherently dangerous instability. The river constantly shifted its channel back and forth across the valley, sometimes widening and then shrinking in the same place over time. The thick, unconsolidated sediment, saturated by a high water table, made the riverbanks soft, yielding, and prone to catastrophic flooding and erosion.

=== The great bend's early inhabitants ===
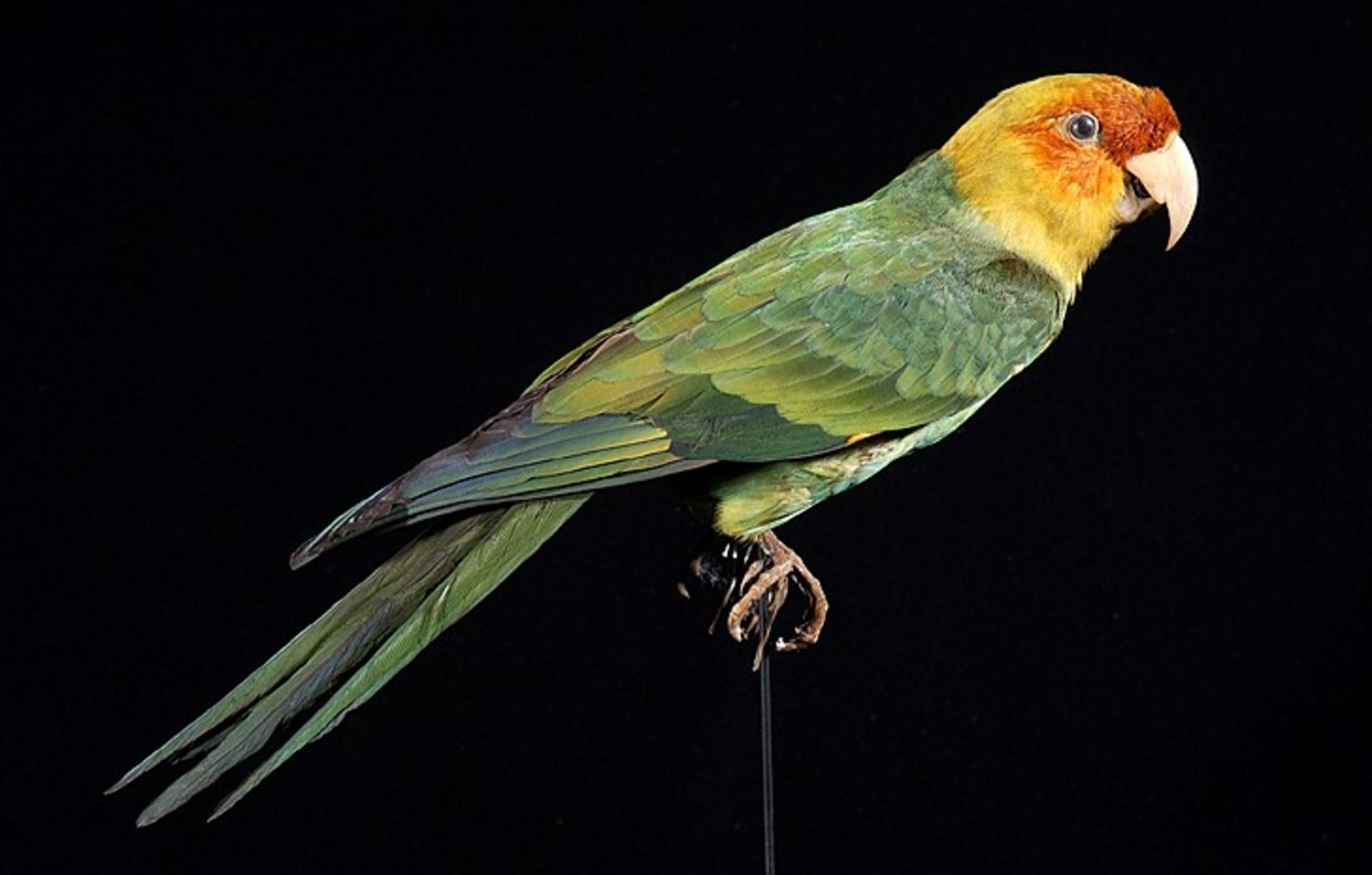
The Carolina parakeet flocked the area until hunted to extinction in the early 1900s.

The strategic location at the river confluence around Kaw Point was a center of a vast region of human activity long before Europeans arrived. From approximately 100 BCE to 700 CE, the area was the westernmost extent of the Hopewell tradition, a network of communities connected by extensive trade routes. Archaeology has identified several Kansas City Hopewell villages, such as the Trowbridge and Renner sites, which were typically located on river terraces overlooking the floodplains.

By the time of sustained European contact, the dominant regional power was the Osage Nation, who call themselves the Ni-u-kon-ska ("People of the Middle Waters"). Their ancestral lands had encompassed the area for centuries, and they controlled the riverways, becoming indispensable trade partners for French traders based in St. Louis.

Nineteenth-century traders and planners saw tremendous economic potential in this "great bend" as a natural emporium for territorial evolution of the United States. This western end of the Missouri River was the logical point to transfer supplies from eastern steamboats onto wagons destined for westward and southwestern overland expansion trails.

Long before American expansion, French Creole traders from St. Louis established extensive trade networks and alliances with the powerful regional tribes, particularly the Osage Nation. These relationships often included intermarriage, creating familial and economic bonds that were vital to the fur trade. As the United States federal government began forcibly relocating eastern tribes to lands west of Missouri, a new economic reality emerged. The removal treaties paid federal annuities to the tribes, creating a significant new market that attracted both established Creole traders and a new wave of American entrepreneurs to the area.

In 1744, decades before Chouteau or Fort Osage, the first European settlement was Fort de Cavagnial in an unknown location somewhere between what became Kansas City, Missouri, and what became Fort Leavenworth, Kansas. French fur traders established and ran that small depot until 1763, when France ceded the entire region to Spain.

By the early 19th century, the Osage territory extended from the Missouri River south to the Red River. A treaty in 1808 established a formal boundary of land cession, and the Osage relinquished claims east of a line drawn south from Fort Osage to the Arkansas River. The south bank of the Missouri River west of the fort remained legally forbidden to outside settlement. This prohibition forced traders like François Chouteau to establish their initial posts on the north side of the river. The land on the south bank was not opened for legal American settlement until the US government coerced the Osage to cede their claims to the land in the Osage Treaty of 1825, which directly enabled the formal establishment and expansion of the French settlement.

Nineteenth-century explorers saw tremendous economic potential in the river's unique geometry, specifically its "great bend" or "elbow" where the stream changes direction abruptly from a south-flowing to an east-flowing one. Traders and military planners saw this bend as a natural emporium, the logical point to transfer goods from steamboats to wagons for overland transport to western and southwestern destinations. Using steamboats to carry goods far upriver to the bend significantly shortened the difficult and time-consuming overland portion of the journey. As early as 1827, army officials grasped this implication when they established Fort Leavenworth as their principal supply station for western operations, and city builders soon wanted to do the same.

=== Chez les Cansès ===
==== Founding ====
The settlement's founding was a commercial and familial enterprise, driven by the powerful Chouteau fur-trading dynasty of St. Louis. In 1819, François Chouteau, a son of Jean Pierre Chouteau, married Bérénice Thérèse Ménard, daughter of Pierre Menard, the first lieutenant governor of Illinois. This union allied two of the region's most influential French Creole families. Their honeymoon was a keelboat expedition up the Missouri to scout a location for a new trading post on behalf of John Jacob Astor's American Fur Company.

In 1821, François, Bérénice, and their employees established their first permanent post in the North Bottoms of the Missouri River, at the Randolph Bluffs (in what became Clay County). This post was destroyed by a flood in 1826. Chouteau relocated to what he believed was higher ground on the south bank, establishing the residential and agricultural settlement known as the French Bottoms. For arriving steamboats, he built Chouteau's Landing at the river's edge at the foot of the bluff (near modern Gillis Street). To service this settlement, a warehouse was built upon the high bluff above, immediately to the south. From these locations, François managed the commercial aspects of the outpost, trading manufactured goods for pelts from the Kansa, Osage, and other regional tribes. Bérénice was instrumental in recruiting other French-speaking families, transforming the post into a viable community. She was later described by town founder John Calvin McCoy as “the soul of the colony”.

==== Culture ====
The French Bottoms was a wide area of river bottoms (all of which was renamed East and West Bottoms in 1850), which eventually contained about sixteen farms. By the early 1830s, it was a thriving Francophone community of at least one hundred people. It was a mix of families from established Creole centers like St. Louis and Kaskaskia, and French trappers of mixed heritage, often referred to as Métis. Several American squatters lived on land without legal title, alongside the established French families.

The settlement's architecture reflected its French colonial roots. Homes were likely built in the poteaux-en-terre ("posts-in-ground") style, with vertical logs set into the earth and the gaps filled with a mixture of mud and grass (bousillage). Land ownership was based on the French colonial long-lot system, where farms were laid out not in the square-mile grid of the American PLSS, but in long, narrow "arpent strips" that maximized river access for many landowners. This system inevitably conflicted with the American PLSS grid that was used to survey and sell land in the region. This created legal ambiguities and disputes, as Bérénice Chouteau discovered after François's death when she had to engage in legal actions to secure clear title to her family's lands under the American system.

Life in the settlement, known derisively by some in wealthier St. Louis as Nouveau Vide Poche ("New Empty Pocket"), was described as communal and vibrant. Social life revolved around weekly dances (bals) with fiddle music and traditional songs (chansons). Visitors recalled a palpable joie de vivre and some wrote of the joyful "Frenchness" of the village's camaraderie, music, and dancing. A visitor in the 1830s said, "Their laughter and gay songs, mixed with the bird song from the tall trees, made a cheerful sound that could be heard from the river, inviting all to come ashore and join in the merriment."

The community's religious life was centered on St. Francis Regis Church. As devout Roman Catholics, the Chouteaus were the primary patrons for the church, a log chapel built in 1835. It was constructed not in the bottoms, but on the high bluffs overlooking the settlement, near the modern corner of Eleventh Street and Pennsylvania Avenue. This location on what became Quality Hill established permanence on safe ground.

A map created in 1841 by the parish priest, Father Nicholas Point, identified the farm plots of 26 resident families, including the Prudhomme, Mercier, Edouard, Bowird, LaGautherie, Tremble, Philbert, Tugeon, and Etue families. A traveler from 1841 recalled: "These country French had week[ly] bals where the tasty pot de bouillon and friendly cup of wine went round and the chansons and fiddles and laughter rang out."

=== Great Flood of 1844 ===
The existence of French Bottoms was precarious. A major flood in 1826 destroyed the Chouteaus' first trading post, forcing a relocation, but this was only a prelude. In June 1844, after weeks of sustained, heavy rain, the Kansas and Missouri rivers crested in what is considered the largest flood in the region's recorded history.

The cataclysmic flood completely obliterated the French Bottoms. The powerful current did not just cover the settlement, but scoured the land, washing away every home, farm, and outbuilding. The destruction was absolute, permanently erasing the physical community. François Chouteau had already died in 1838, but his brother Frederick, who operated a nearby trading post, provided an eyewitness account. He recalled swimming his horses through the floodwaters to safety on high ground and, with other survivors, building a new log house in three days in the rain. Across the rivers and beyond Kaw Point, hundreds of Wyandot people recently forcibly removed to there, were killed by the flood.

Survivors from the French Bottoms portion of Chouteau's Town were led by the widowed matriarch Bérénice Chouteau, to abandon the untenable floodplain and relocate permanently to the elevated portion of Chouteau's Town upon the bluffs. Fellow pioneers wrote about her remarkable fortitude in choosing to remain there on the American frontier to manage the family's extensive business and land interests rather than return to St. Louis. She sold a 110-acre (45 ha) tract in 1855 to town cofounder Kersey Coates that became the Quality Hill neighborhood. The Chouteau business operations moved to a new warehouse on the bluffs, near what became Harrison Street. This fully consolidated townsite upon higher, more durable ground, set the physical and economic trajectory for Kansas City's origin story, leading directly to the legal incorporation of Kansas, Missouri, in 1850, which grew from fewer than 500 residents in 1855 to 4,418 by 1860. The bottoms were reportedly naturally reforested by 1855.

A historical marker in the former French Bottoms notes, "But the great flood of 1844 washed away all of their little homes and improvements, and a Catholic priest reported sadly that thereafter all one could hear wafting up from the little French clearings were the songs of the birds and the chattering of the squirrels."

== Legacy ==
Though it existed for only about two decades, historians regard French Bottoms as the "nucleus" from which Kansas City grew. In 1850, the founders of the new legally incorporated town of Kansas renamed the former French Bottoms as the West Bottoms and East Bottoms, which were remade decades later as an industrial and transportation hub. Kansas was renamed the City of Kansas and then Kansas City, and its 20th century government renamed the much larger East Bottoms to the Northeast Industrial District.

In 2021, the city's origins were commemorated by the François Chouteau & Native American Heritage Monument, located on Chouteau Trafficway, near the original trading post by the Chouteau Bridge. The monument features bronze sculptures by artist Kwan Wu depicting François Chouteau, an Osage family, and a Kansa hunter, honoring the foundational trading relationships between the French settlers and regional tribes.
