= Bernard Donnelly =

Irish Roman Catholic priest (1810–1880)

The Reverend Bernard Donnelly
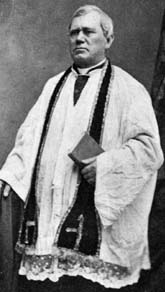
- Born: 29 June 1810; Kilnacreeva, County Cavan, Ireland
- Died: 15 December 1880 (aged 70), Kansas City, Missouri, United States
- Education: St. Mary's of the Barrens

Bernard Donnelly (29 June 1810 – 15 December 1880) was an Irish Catholic priest who ministered to the Catholic community in Kansas City, Missouri in the nineteenth century; he was also the founder of Kansas City's Irish community. The Irish immigrants he brought with him to Kansas City helped carve out many of the city's River Market and Downtown streets from the bluffs of the Missouri River. Fr. Donnelly's brickworks was responsible for the construction of several historic Downtown Kansas City Catholic churches including the Cathedral of the Immaculate Conception, and Old St. Patrick's.

== Biography ==
Bernard Donnelly was born in Kilnacreeva, County Cavan, Ireland in 1810. He was educated in Cavan and Dublin as an engineer and earned his first job helping to build the docks in Liverpool in the 1820s and 1830s. While in Liverpool, Donnelly met Fr. Theobald Matthew (1790-1856) a noted temperance reformer who mentored Donnelly as a public organizer and speaker.

Donnelly immigrated to the United States in the late 1830s, first settling in Philadelphia where he worked as a teacher. In 1840 Donnelly enrolled in St. Mary's of the Barrens Seminary with the intention of serving as a Roman Catholic priest for the Irish community in the United States. Fr. Donnelly was ordained a priest in 1845 by Peter Richard Kenrick, (1806–1896) Archbishop of St. Louis. He was assigned to St. Mary's Parish in Independence, Missouri where he earned the nickname "the Pioneer Priest". He also served as a priest to the French community living at the confluence of the Kansas and Missouri rivers established by François Chouteau (1797–1838) in 1821. Their parish, St. John Francis Regis, was founded as a log cabin church in 1835.

When the City of Kansas City, Missouri was incorporated in 1853 Fr. Donnelly was one of the early proponents of local development. He organized a group of 300 Irish immigrants, mostly from the counties of Connacht to come to Kansas City and begin the process of carving through the bluffs of the Missouri River that were a barrier between the town's original plot and the river landings in the West and East Bottoms. Among the early ecclesiastical buildings that Fr. Donnelly constructed was a new brick Church of the Immaculate Conception built on the site of the old Church of St. John Francis Regis. To serve these Irish immigrants Fr. Donnelly was given permission to establish a new parish in Kansas City called St. Patrick's in 1869 next to which Fr. Donnelly established a brickworks that became central to the construction of many of the original buildings of the new city. In 1872 due to structural problems the original St. Patrick's Church had to be demolished and a new church located at the intersection of 8th Street and Cherry Street was dedicated on Christmas Day 1875.

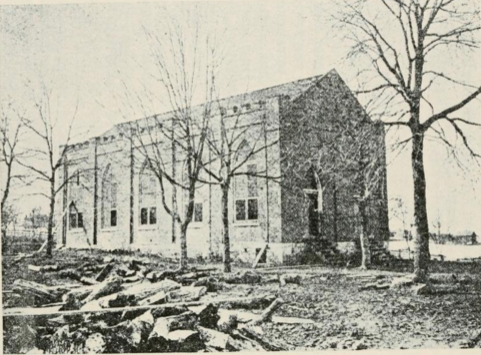
The Church of the Immaculate Conception, cathedral church of the Diocese of Kansas City after 1880. Built by Fr. Bernard Donnelly in 1856.

Fr. Donnelly died on 15 December 1880, in his parish rectory. He was buried in Mount St. Mary's Cemetery in Kansas City, Missouri.

== Legacy ==
Several of Fr. Donnelly's personal effects are displayed in the chapel at St. Teresa's Academy in Kansas City. Fr. Donnelly is also the namesake of the first modern division of the Ancient Order of Hibernians in the State of Kansas, which was founded in 2002.
