= Great Flood of 1993 =

1993 Midwestern United States flooding

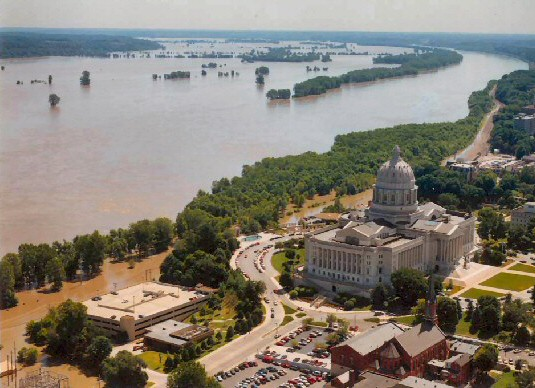
- Flood waters inundated parts of Jefferson City, Missouri, and limited access to the Missouri State Capitol during the Great Flood of 1993.

Meteorological history
- Duration: April – October 1993

Overall effects
- Fatalities: 38 – 50
- Damage: $12–16 billion
- Areas affected: Illinois, Iowa, Kansas, Minnesota, Missouri, Nebraska, North Dakota, South Dakota, and Wisconsin

The Great Flood of 1993 (or Great Mississippi and Missouri Rivers Flood of 1993) was a flood that occurred in the Midwestern United States, along the Mississippi and Missouri rivers and their tributaries, from April to October 1993.

The flood is among the most costly and devastating to ever occur in the United States, with 50 dead and US$12–16 billion in damages (equivalent to $24–32 billion in 2025). The hydrographic basin affected an area approximately totaling 320,000 square miles (830,000 km^{2}), of about 745 miles (1,199 km) in length and about 435 miles (700 km) in width. Within this zone, the flooded area totaled around 30,000 square miles (78,000 km^{2}) and was the worst such U.S. disaster since the Great Mississippi Flood of 1927, as measured by duration, area inundated, persons displaced, crop and property damage, and number of record river levels. In some categories, the 1993 flood even surpassed the 1927 flood, at the time the largest flood ever recorded on the Mississippi River.

== Causes and progression ==
A volcanic winter is thought to have started with the 1991 eruption of Mount Pinatubo. It has been suggested that excess cloud condensation nuclei from the eruption were responsible for the Great Flood of 1993 in the Midwestern United States.

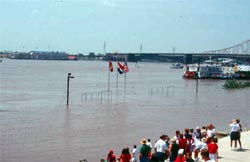
View of St. Louis riverfront during the Great Flood

Above-normal rainfall and below-normal temperatures beginning in the summer of 1992 resulted in above-normal soil moisture and reservoir levels in the Missouri and Upper Mississippi River basins. This weather pattern persisted throughout the following autumn. During the winter of 1992–93, the region experienced heavy snowfall. These conditions were followed by persistent spring weather patterns that produced storms over the same locations. Soils across much of the affected area were saturated by June 1, with additional rainfall all running off into streams and rivers, instead of soaking into the ground. These wet-weather conditions contrasted sharply with the droughts and heat waves experienced in the southeastern United States.

Storms, persistent and repetitive in nature during the late spring and summer, crowded the Upper Midwest with voluminous rainfall. Portions of east-central Iowa received as much as 48 inches (120 cm) of rain between April 1 and August 31, 1993, and many areas across the central-northern plains had precipitation 400–7502% above normal. In the St. Louis National Weather Service (NWS) forecast area encompassing eastern Missouri and southwest Illinois, 36 forecast points rose above flood stage, and 20 river-stage records were broken. The 1993 flood broke record river levels set during the 1973 Mississippi and the 1951 Missouri River floods.

Civil Air Patrol crews from 21 states served more than 5,000 meals to flood victims and volunteers, and their pilots logged more than 1,500 hours in the air inspecting utility lines and pipelines.

Over 1,000 flood warnings and statements, five times the normal, were issued to notify the public and need-to-know officials of river levels. In such places as St. Louis, river levels were nearly 20 feet (6.1 m) above flood stage, the highest ever recorded there in 228 years. The 52-foot (16 m)-high St. Louis Floodwall, built to handle the volume of the Great Flood of 1844, was able to keep the 1993 flood out with just over two feet (0.61 m) to spare. This floodwall was built in the 1960s, to great controversy, out of interlocking prefabricated concrete blocks.

Emergency officials estimated that nearly all of the 700 privately built agricultural levees were overtopped or destroyed along the Missouri River. Navigation on the Mississippi and Missouri River had been closed since early July, resulting in a loss of $2 million (1993) per day in commerce.

James Scott, a 23-year-old Illinois man, was convicted in 1994 for "intentionally causing a catastrophe" and sentenced to life imprisonment for his role in causing some of the flooding across the river from Quincy, Illinois. In an attempt to strand his wife on the other side of the river so he could continue partying, Scott allegedly removed several sandbags from a levee holding back the water. The breach flooded 14,000 acres (57 km^{2}) of farmland, destroyed buildings, and closed a bridge. His conviction was overturned in 1997, but reinstated in 1998. He maintains his innocence behind bars.

=== May ===
The Redwood River in Minnesota began experiencing severe flooding in May. On May 22, Sioux Falls, South Dakota, received 7.5 inches (190 mm) of rain in a three-hour period. From May through July, Sioux Falls, South Dakota received 22.55 inches (573 mm) of rain, the wettest three-month period in its history.

=== June ===
As noted above, rains in South Dakota contributed to flooding downstream. In June, flooding occurred along the Black River in Wisconsin, with flooding also starting to occur along the Mississippi, Missouri, and Kansas rivers. Starting as early as June 7, reports of levees being overtopped and levee breaks became common. These breaches acted to delay the flood crests, temporarily storing excess water in the adjacent lowlands, but the rain kept falling.

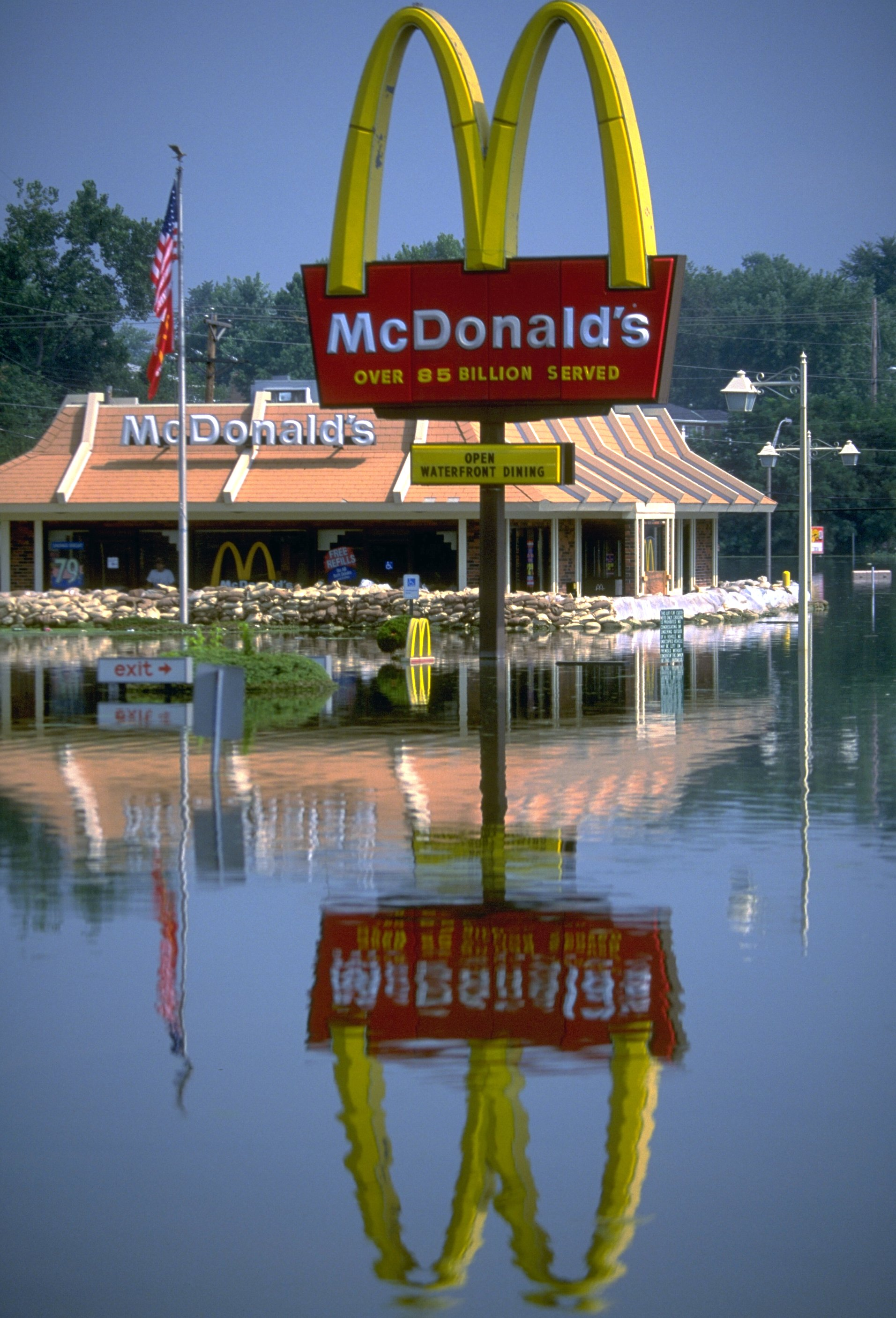
Mississippi River out of its banks in Festus, Missouri. The spot where this photo was taken is nearly 1.5 miles (2.4 km) west and 30 feet (9.1 m) above the river.

In the beginning of June, the Missouri and Mississippi rivers dropped below flood stage and were receding. During the second week of June, river levels rose to near flood stage before yet again beginning their slow recession. By the end of June, the Mississippi River was four feet (1.2 m) below flood stage at St. Louis, while many other river locations in the region were near flood stage. Precipitation for the month averaged from one inch (25 mm) above normal in Kansas City, to nearly four inches (100 mm) above normal in Springfield, Missouri.

=== July ===
July brought more heavy rain to the Missouri and upper Mississippi River basins in Missouri, Iowa, Kansas, Nebraska, North and South Dakota, Illinois, and Minnesota. Rainfall amounts of 5 to 7 inches (130 to 180 millimetres) in 24 hours were common. Precipitation for the month averaged from one inch (25 mm) above normal at St. Louis and Springfield, to between six and seven inches (150 and 180 mm) above normal at Columbia and Kansas City, Missouri.

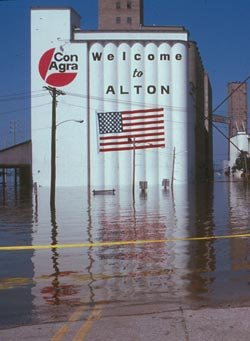
Water encroaching on the city of Alton, Illinois

In Iowa, the flood waters brought mass destruction. On July 9, four buildings on Iowa State University's campus flooded, resulting in over 1.4 million dollars in estimated damages and six weeks of construction to reopen. The college's indoor sports arena, Hilton Coliseum, was flooded with as much as fourteen feet of water. From July 11 until July 22, the Des Moines Water Works was flooded by the Raccoon River. This resulted in the plant being powered down, unable to provide running water for that period. On July 13, electricity returned to more than 35,000 residents. That same day President Bill Clinton toured Iowa's capitol and neighboring cities alongside Governor Terry Branstad. He later declared a state of disaster for Iowa, Minnesota, Wisconsin, Illinois and Missouri and asked Congress to approve 2.5 billion dollars in Federal disaster relief. During this time the Army National Guard and American Red Cross set up water stations, and the local Anheuser-Busch distributor contributed water in white six-packs with their logo on it. Once running water was restored, there was enough pressure for people to bathe and flush toilets, but the water was not certified potable until July 29. The final usage restrictions were lifted in August.

Major sandbagging activities took place along the higher Missouri River, the River des Peres in St. Louis, the Mississippi River south of St. Louis, and on many other tributaries across Missouri and Illinois. Some of these efforts were successful, while others were not. The copious rain during July sent record-setting crests down the Mississippi and Missouri Rivers, causing river gauges to malfunction along the way. The record crests met within days of each other at their confluence near St. Louis. Navigation on the Mississippi and Missouri River was closed in early July, resulting in a loss of $2 million (1993) per day in commerce.

Mississippi River levels stabilized for a few days at April 1973 record stages. When the crest from the Missouri River arrived, levels rose again. The Mississippi River broke through levees, drove people and their possessions to higher ground, and caused havoc through the floodplains.

The crests, now combined as one, moved downstream through St. Louis on the way to the Upper Mississippi's confluence with the Ohio River at Cairo, Illinois. Only minor flooding occurred below Cairo due to the Lower Mississippi's larger channel below that point, as well as drought conditions in the eastern U.S. If the Ohio River watershed had not been in drought while the Missouri and Upper Mississippi were in flood, the 1993 flood might have rivaled the 1927 flood in overall damage on the Lower Mississippi, beyond Cairo.

=== August ===
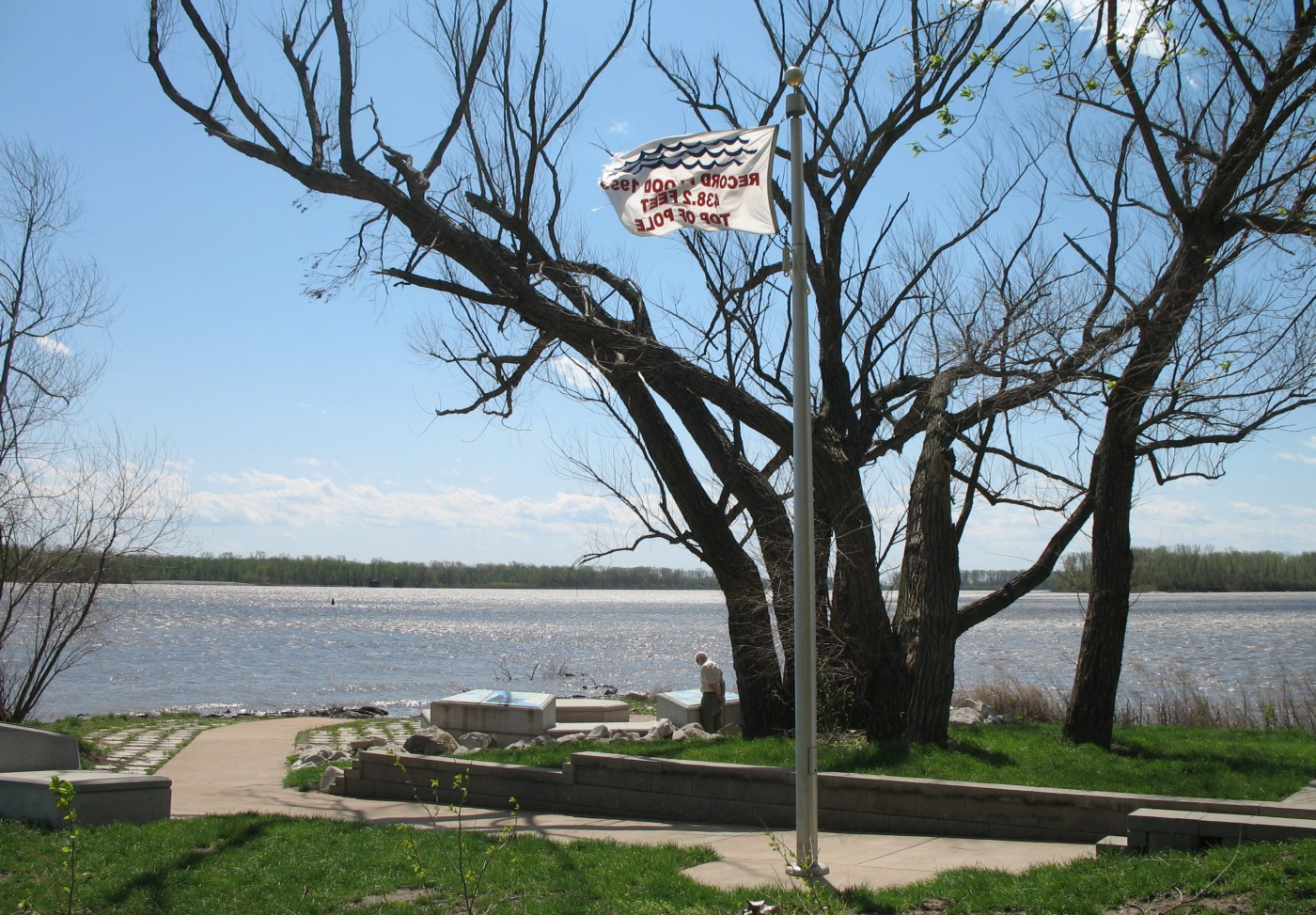
Monument to the 1993 flood at Jones-Confluence Point State Park at the confluence of the Missouri and Mississippi Rivers in St. Charles County, Missouri, 400 feet (120 m) above sea level. The water reached the top of the pole at 438.2 feet (133.6 m).

On August 1, levee breaks near Columbia, Illinois, flooded 47,000 acres (190 km^{2}) of land, inundating the Illinois towns of Valmeyer and Fults. The released water continued to flow parallel to the river, approaching the levees protecting historic Prairie du Rocher and Fort de Chartres. On August 3, officials decided to break through the stronger Mississippi River levee to allow the water back into the river. The plan worked and the historic areas were saved, although some residential areas were flooded in counties above Prairie du Rocher.

The Mississippi River at St. Louis crested at 49.6 feet (15.1 m) on August 1, nearly 20 feet (6.1 m) above flood stage. It had a peak flow rate of 1,080,000 ft^{3}/s (30,600 m^{3}/s). At this rate, a bowl the size of Busch Memorial Stadium in St. Louis would be filled to the brim in 70 seconds.

== Costs and damage ==
Some locations on the Mississippi River flooded for almost 200 days, while various regions by the Missouri neared 100 days of flooding. On the Mississippi, Grafton, Illinois, recorded flooding for 195 days; Clarksville, Missouri, for 187 days; Winfield, Missouri, for 183 days; Hannibal, Missouri, for 174 days; and Quincy, Illinois, for 152 days. The Missouri River was above flood stage for 62 days in Jefferson City, Missouri, 77 days at Hermann, Missouri, and for 94 days at St. Charles in the St. Louis metropolitan area. On October 7, 103 days after the flooding began, the Mississippi River at St. Louis finally dropped below flood stage. Approximately 100,000 homes were destroyed as a result of the flooding, 15,000,000 acres (23,000 sq mi; 61,000 km^{2}) of farmland inundated, and the whole towns of Valmeyer, Illinois, and Rhineland, Missouri, were relocated to higher ground.

Reports in 1994 set the deaths due to the flood at 38, though this had been revised to 50 deaths by 1996. The fiscal cost is estimated at $12–16 billion (equivalent to $24–32 billion in 2025). Even after the water was gone, large amounts of sand still covered the farmlands and homes.

== Comparison with other major floods in Kansas City ==
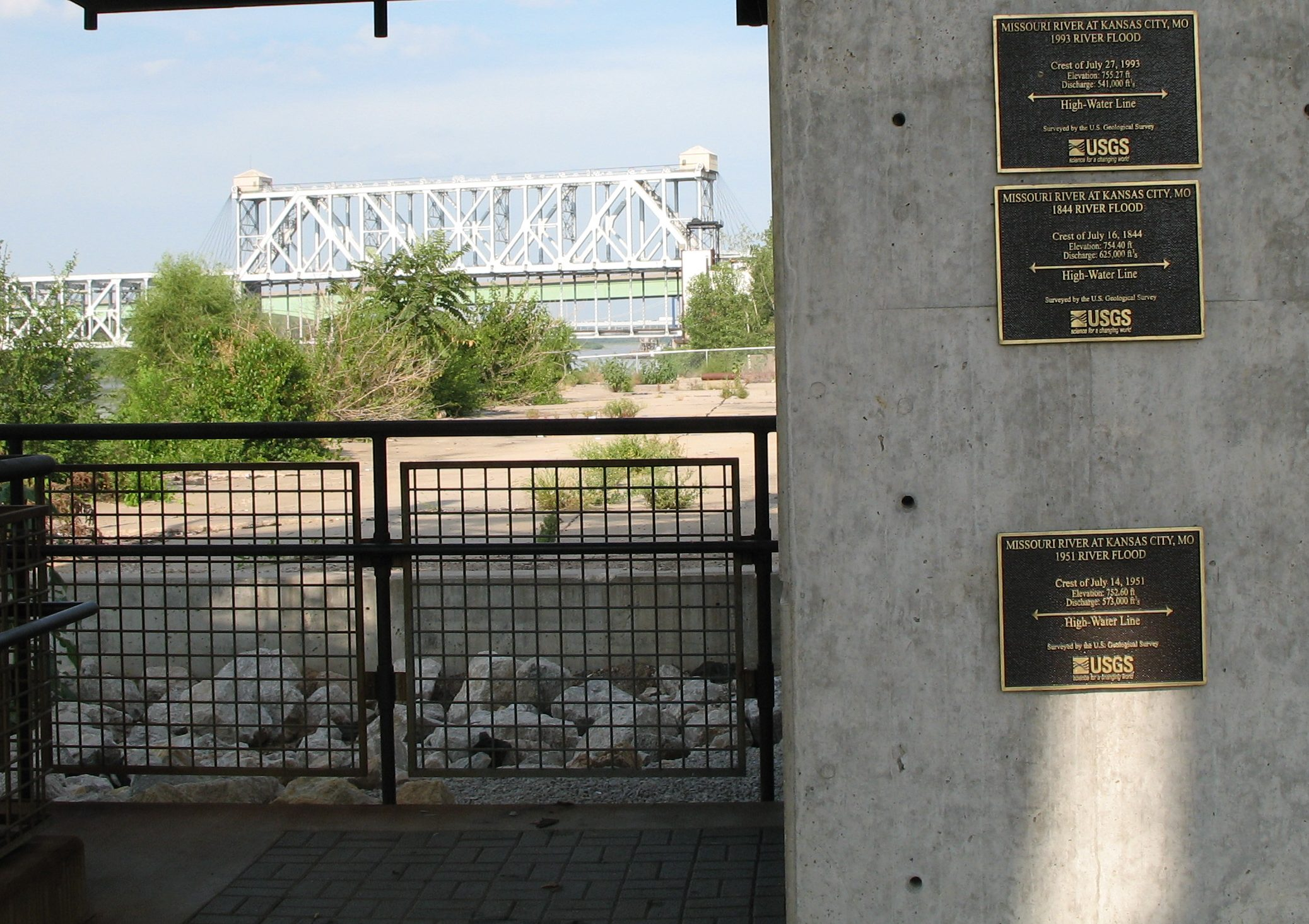
High water marks at Westport Landing on the Missouri River in Kansas City. The flood heights from top to bottom are 1993, 1844 and 1951. ASB Bridge in background

Over time, channeling and levee construction have altered how floods affect various areas along the Missouri River. For example, here is a comparison of flood data at – and associated impacts on – Kansas City for three big floods since the early 19th century.

- Great Flood of 1844 – This was the biggest flood of the three in terms of rate of discharge at Westport Landing in Kansas City. It is estimated that 625,000 cubic feet per second (17,700 m^{3}/s) was discharged in the flood. However, the crest on July 16, 1844, was almost 1 foot (0.30 m) lower than the 1993 flood. The entire French Bottoms settlement was destroyed, and hundreds of Wyandot people newly arrived in 1843 were killed.
- Great Flood of 1951 – The 1951 flood was the second biggest in terms of rate of discharge at 573,000 cubic feet per second (16,200 m^{3}/s). The crest on July 14, 1951, was almost two feet (0.61 m) lower than the 1844 flood and three feet (0.91 m) lower than 1993. However, the flood was the most devastating of all modern floods for Kansas City since its levee system was not built to withstand it. It destroyed the Kansas City Stockyards and caused Kansas City to build Kansas City International Airport away from the Missouri River bottoms to replace the heavily damaged Fairfax Airport in Kansas City, Kansas.
- Great Flood of 1993 – The 1993 flood was the highest of any of the three but had the lowest rate of discharge at 541,000 cubic feet per second (15,300 m^{3}/s). While the 1993 flood had devastating impacts elsewhere, Kansas City survived it relatively well because of levee improvements after the 1951 flood.
