= François Chouteau =

American pioneer (1797–1838)

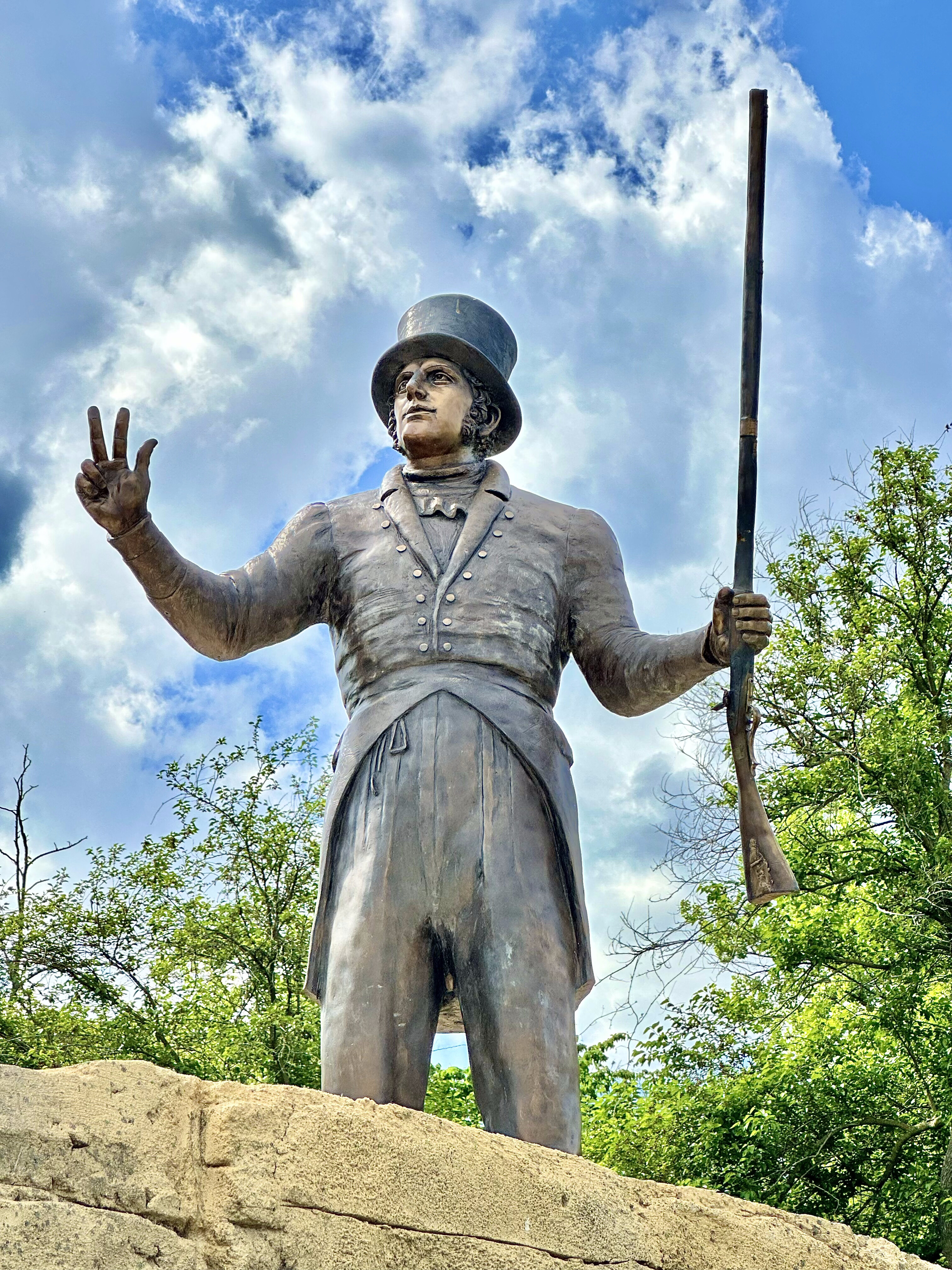
- Sculpture at the Chouteau Heritage Fountain
- Born: February 7, 1797; St. Louis, Missouri
- Died: April 18, 1838 (aged 41); Kansas City, Missouri
- Burial place: Calvary Cemetery, St. Louis, Missouri; 38.69460°N 90.25200°W
- Monuments: Chouteau Heritage Fountain
- Occupation: Entrepreneur
- Known for: Pioneering Kansas City, Missouri
- Spouse: Bérénice Thérèse Ménard
- Children: 10
- Parents: Jean Pierre Chouteau (father); Brigitte Saucier (mother)
- Relatives: Auguste Chouteau, uncle

François Gesseau Chouteau (February 7, 1797 – April 18, 1838) was a French-American pioneer fur trader and entrepreneur from the prominent Chouteau fur-trading family. He is widely regarded as the "Father of Kansas City".

Chouteau was born in St. Louis, which was co-founded within New Spain by his uncle Auguste Chouteau. He learned the family business from his father, Jean Pierre Chouteau, who presided over a vast trading empire. St. Louis was the center of American fur trade, sometimes called the "king of the fur trade". In 1819, he married Bérénice Thérèse Ménard, daughter of Pierre Menard, the first Lieutenant Governor of Illinois. For their honeymoon, they scouted up the Missouri River to find a site for their new trading post.

In 1821, as an agent for John Jacob Astor's American Fur Company, Chouteau established the first permanent European-American settlement in the area that became Kansas City. Chouteau's Landing became a vital center for trade with Native American tribes, including the Osage Nation, Kansa, Shawnee, and Kickapoo. The settlement was known as Chez les Cansès (French for "at the place of the Kansa"), as the nucleus around which Kansas City grew. Chouteau and his wife were instrumental in establishing the community's first church in a log cabin, which evolved into the Cathedral of the Immaculate Conception.

François Chouteau had ten children: a son, James, with an Osage woman, and nine children with Bérénice. He died in 1838 at age 41. Bérénice continued to manage the family's business interests and was a revered community matriarch known as the "Mother of Kansas City", "Grande Dame of Kansas City", and "the soul of the colony" until her death in 1888. The Chouteau Heritage Fountain is a modern monument commemorating their foundational role in the city's history.

== Early life ==
François Gesseau Chouteau was born on February 7, 1797, in St. Louis, which was then part of Spanish Upper Louisiana. The city had been co-founded 33 years earlier by his uncle, Auguste Chouteau. His parents were the prominent French-born fur trader Jean Pierre Chouteau and his second wife, Brigitte Saucier. François learned the fur business from his father and half-brother Auguste Pierre, as the trade was the foundation of St. Louis's early economy.

On July 12, 1819, the 22-year-old Chouteau married 18-year-old Bérénice Thérèse Ménard in St. Louis. She was born in Kaskaskia, Illinois, and later lived in Cahokia; her father, Pierre Menard, was a highly successful trader and the first Lieutenant Governor of Illinois. The marriage united two of the region's most powerful French Creole families. As a honeymoon, they traveled by keelboat up the Missouri River from St. Louis to the Blacksnake Hills area (near modern St. Joseph, Missouri), prospecting for a location to build their own trading post.

== Career ==
=== Fur trading ===
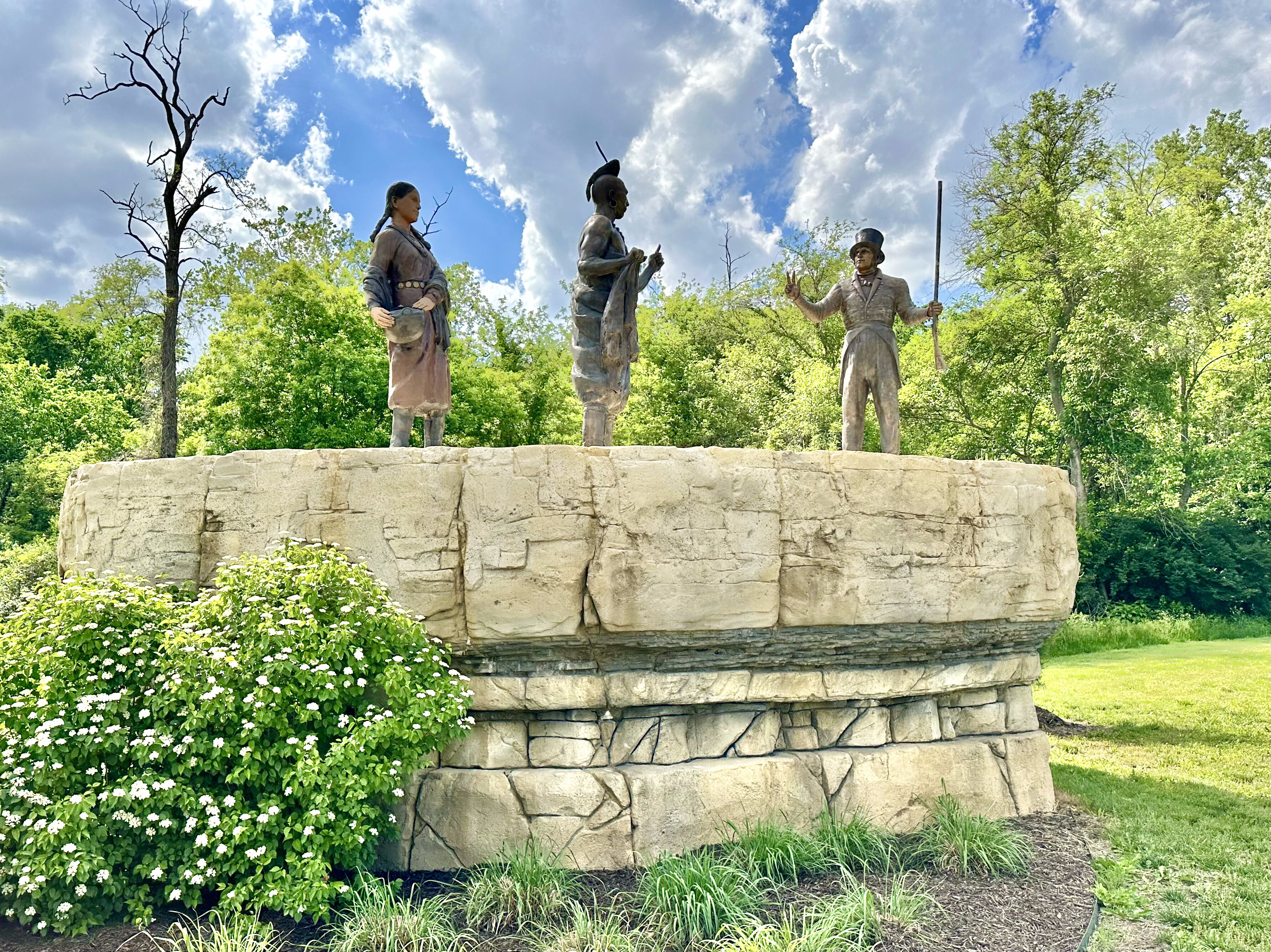
The Osage Nation trades with François Chouteau at the Chouteau Heritage Fountain.

In 1819, before his permanent settlement, Chouteau and his cousin Gabriel S. Sères established a temporary trading post for the American Fur Company on the Randolph Bluffs in Clay County. In 1821, Chouteau, his wife Bérénice, and his employees established a permanent post at a site on the Missouri River, a few miles east of the mouth of the Kansas River. This warehouse and trading post, known as Chouteau's Landing, was located in a wide expanse of river bottoms opposite Kaw Point, an area that became known as the French Bottoms. It was the first permanent European-American settlement in what would become Kansas City.

Chouteau's brother Cyprien later joined the enterprise. In 1825, they partnered with Gabriel Prud'homme, and the group expanded the family's trading operations along western routes. After a major flood in 1826, Chouteau relocated the post to higher ground near the riverfront at what became Troost Avenue. He traded manufactured goods for animal pelts with the Shawnee, Kickapoo, Kansa, and Osage tribes, supplying the American Fur Company with furs for markets in the Eastern United States and Europe.

In 1835, with the support of the Chouteaus, a log church dedicated to St. Francis Regis was built high on the bluff. Its first priest was Father Bénédict Roux, recruited from St. Louis. So many of Chouteau's family and employees were congregants that it was popularly known as Chouteau's Church. Bérénice was its primary benefactor. The Cathedral of the Immaculate Conception was later constructed on the same site.

The riverbottom settlement that grew around the post was called Chez les Cansès ("at the place of the Kansa"), and sometimes Chouteau's Town. The French Bottoms, a wide area of river bottoms, eventually contained about sixteen farms. This settlement of French-American, American, and tribes, was noted for its vibrant culture. Visitors wrote of the joyful "Frenchness" of the village's camaraderie, music, and dancing. A visitor in the 1830s said, "Their laughter and gay songs, mixed with the bird song from the tall trees, made a cheerful symphony for any of their countrymen who happened to pass that way." A traveler from 1841 recalled: "These country French had week bals where the tasty pot de bouillon and friendly cup of wine went round and the chansons and fiddles and laughter rang out." This community was devastated by the Great Flood of 1844, which destroyed most of the buildings and farms. The historical marker notes, "But the great flood of 1844 washed away all of their little homes and improvements, and a Catholic priest reported sadly that thereafter all one could hear wafting up from the little French clearings were the songs of the birds and the chattering of the squirrels."

=== Competition and growth ===
By the 1830s, the town of Independence, Missouri, about 10 miles (16 km) to the east, had become the primary outfitting point for the Santa Fe Trail, and later the Oregon Trail and California Trail, drawing trade away from the river-centric posts. To compete, surveyor and entrepreneur John Calvin McCoy founded the town of Westport 4 miles (6.4 km) inland from Chouteau's settlement. In 1834, McCoy established a steamboat landing on a stable rock ledge at the river, which he called Westport Landing. This landing, incorporated in 1850 as the town of Kansas, Missouri, provided a more direct connection for the growing overland trails. Chouteau and McCoy became cooperative neighbors, working together to develop the area and attract commerce away from Independence.

== Death ==
François Chouteau died on April 18, 1838, at the age of 41. The cause is variously reported as either a heart attack or from being trampled by a horse. His funeral was held at the Old Cathedral in St. Louis on April 25, 1838. He is buried in Calvary Cemetery in St. Louis. His grave is marked by a large obelisk, which also marks the graves of his mother, Brigitte, and three of his children who died in infancy. He is regarded as the "Father of Kansas City", though Kansas, Missouri was not formally incorporated until 1850, twelve years after his death.

== Family ==
=== Bérénice Chouteau ===
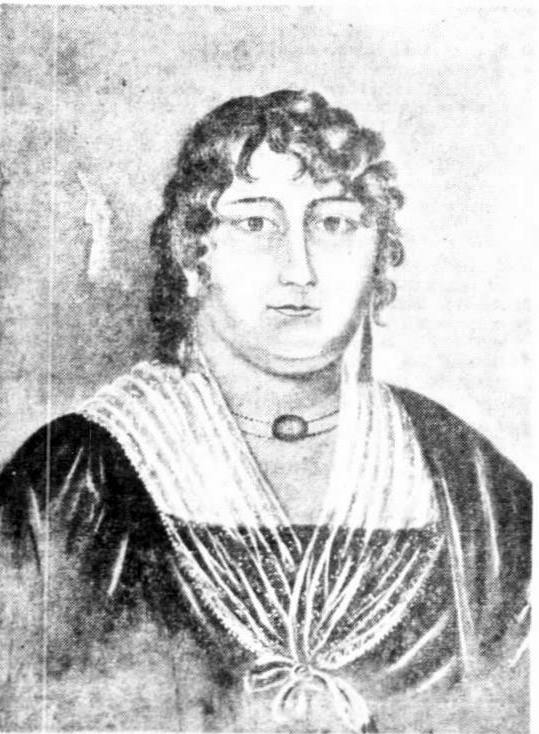
Bérénice Chouteau

After François's death, Bérénice Chouteau continued to operate the family's trading interests and later ran a retail store. She was a central figure in the community and local Catholic church. John Calvin McCoy, founder of Westport and co-founder of Kansas, described her as "the soul of the colony". In her later years, she became known as the "Grande Dame of Kansas City" and the "Mother of Kansas City". A family legend holds that Bérénice destroyed the only portrait ever made of her, as she could not stand for an image of herself to exist when there was none of her late husband.

During the American Civil War, local violence culminating in the Battle of Westport prompted her to move for safety, first to Ste. Genevieve, Missouri, and later to Kaskaskia, Illinois. She returned to Kansas City in 1867. Bérénice outlived all nine of her children and died on November 20, 1888, at the age of 87. The New York Times eulogized her as "perhaps the most noted historic character of Western Missouri—the link connecting the past with the present".

=== Children ===
François Chouteau had ten known children. His first son was born to an Osage woman, and he had nine children with Bérénice Thérèse Ménard.

With a member of the Osage Nation:

- James G. Chouteau (b. before 1825)

With Bérénice Thérèse Ménard (m. 1819):

- Edmond François Chouteau, b. 1821 in St. Louis–d. 1853 in Jackson County, Missouri
- Pierre Menard Chouteau, b. 1822 in St. Louis–d. 1885 in Jackson County, Missouri
- Louis Amédée Chouteau, b. 1825 in St. Louis–d. 1827 in St. Louis
- Louis Sylvestre Chouteau, b. 1827 in St. Louis–d. 1829 in St. Louis
- Benjamin Chouteau, b. 1828 in St. Louis–d. 1871 in St. Louis
- Frederick D. Chouteau, b. 1831 in Independence, Missouri–d. after 1870
- Benedict Pharamond Chouteau, b. 1833 in Jackson County, Missouri–d. 1834 in St. Louis
- Mary Brigite Chouteau, b. 1835 in Jackson County, Missouri–d. 1864 in St. Louis
- Thérèse Odile Chouteau, b. 1837 in Jackson County, Missouri–d. 1837 in Jackson County

== Legacy ==
François and Bérénice Chouteau were the first permanent pioneers of the wild frontier that became Kansas City, Missouri. The Martin City Telegraph summarized their impact: "This early commerce on the western side of Missouri was launched when a newly-married couple took a risk by settling on the edge of the frontier. The future of fur trading in western Missouri would be directly connected to them, and Kansas City likely wouldn't have developed without the Chouteau’s enterprising spirit."

Chouteau's legacy is commemorated in Kansas City through several place names, including Chouteau Bridge and Chouteau Trafficway. Chouteau Heritage Fountain is a park with a large monument featuring bronze sculptures by R.M. Lange, located on Chouteau Trafficway.

To commemorate the foundational trading relationship between the Chouteau family and the regional tribes, the Osage Nation partnered with Kansas City to create the Chouteau Heritage Fountain, dedicated in 2021. It is located in the River North neighborhood, near the site of Chouteau's original post and his modern namesakes, the Chouteau Bridge and Chouteau Trafficway.
