= Kilnacreeva =

Townland in County Cavan, Ireland

Kilnacreeva (Irish: Cill na Craoibhe, meaning 'church of the branching tree') is a townland in County Cavan, Ireland. It is an area of beautiful old Irish churches, ancient castles, traditional Irish pubs and extensive pasture fields interspersed with thick green bushes.

It includes the subtownland Rabbit Island.

== History ==
A number of forts were built in the area c. 1000 BC, to protect the inhabitants from roving bandits and wild animals. In the 16th and 17th centuries the land was owned by British landlords and Irish peasants were the sharecroppers who had to give most of their farming products to the landlords. As of the 21st century, the land in Kilnacreeva is owned and cultivated by farmers.
