= Chouteau Bridge =

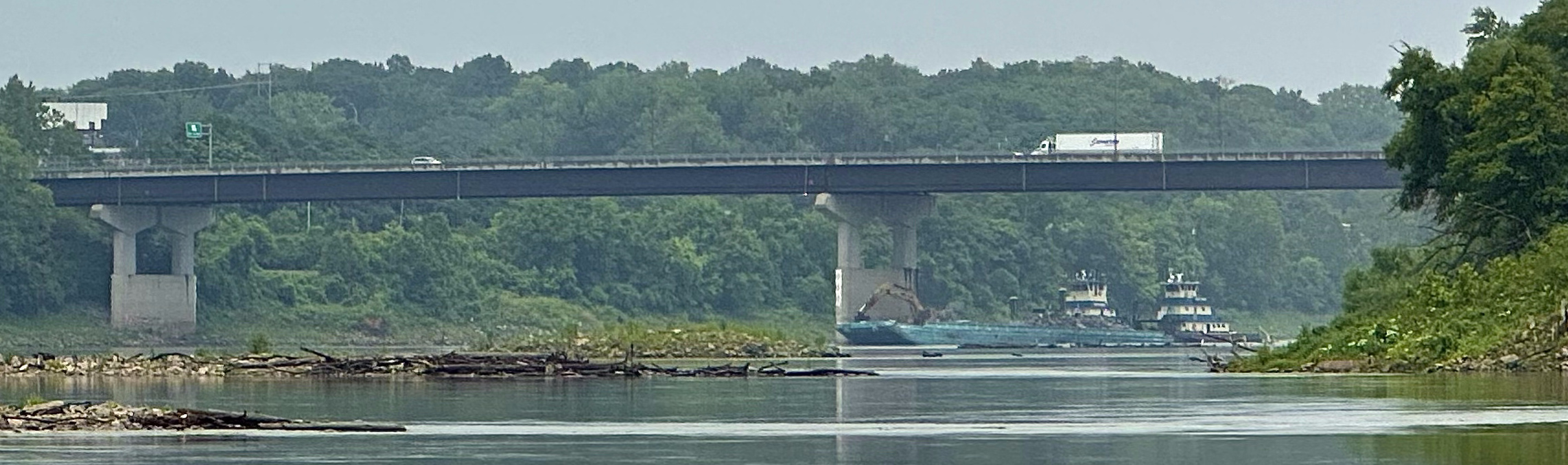
- A river barge passes beneath the second Chouteau Bridge, going westbound toward Riverfront Park in 2023.
- Coordinates: 39°08′44″N 94°32′02″W
- Carries: 4 lanes of Route 269 (Chouteau Trafficway)
- Crosses: Missouri River
- Locale: Kansas City, Missouri
- Official name: Chouteau Bridge
- Maintained by: MoDOT
- ID number: 12102

Characteristics
- Design: Girder

History
- Opened: 2002

The Chouteau Bridge is a four-lane girder bridge on Route 269 across the Missouri River between Jackson County, Missouri, and Clay County, Missouri.

The bridge is named for François Chouteau, who was a member of the Chouteau fur trapping family and is considered the first permanent settler in what became Kansas City. Two successive bridges have carried the name Chouteau Bridge.

== Original bridge ==
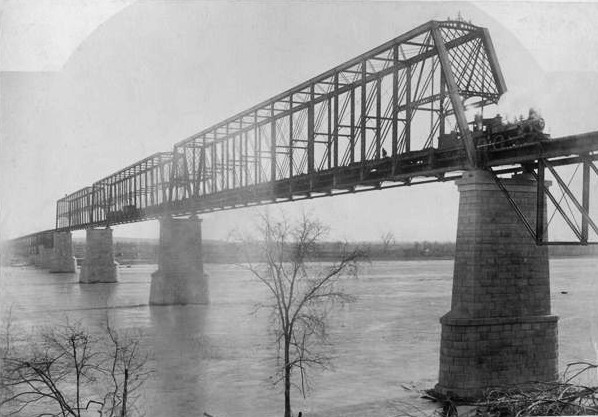
The original bridge in 1896

The first bridge was a three-span Whipple truss bridge, built in 1887, and was the second bridge over the Missouri River in the Kansas City, Missouri, area. It was originally a railroad bridge built and used by the Chicago, Milwaukee, St. Paul and Pacific Railroad, also known as the Milwaukee Road.

Upon the completion and opening of the Harry S. Truman Bridge downstream to the east, the Chouteau Bridge was converted to vehicular use in 1951. The bridge was very narrow, and in the latter years was often closed due to accidents, and due to low weight issues, when it was reduced to 3 tons, it was closed permanently, and removed by implosion in 2001. It was the oldest bridge on the river when it was demolished.

== Current bridge ==
In 2001, a new span was built a few yards upstream to the west of the old span. The north end of the bridge is near the entrance for the Harrah's Casino at the city of North Kansas City, Missouri.

== See also ==
- List of bridges documented by the Historic American Engineering Record in Missouri
- List of crossings of the Missouri River
