= Quality Hill, Kansas City =

Coordinates: 39.104913°N 94.592089°W

- Quality Hill
- U.S. National Register of Historic Places
- U.S. Historic district
- View down Pennsylvania Avenue from the 1910s
- Location: Kansas City, MO
- Architect: Louis S. Curtiss
- Architectural style: Queen Anne
- NRHP reference No.: 78001657
- Added to NRHP: July 7, 1978

Quality Hill is a historic neighborhood near downtown Kansas City, Missouri, USA, on a 200-foot-high bluff which overlooks the confluence of the Kansas and Missouri rivers in the West Bottoms below.

Located on the west side of downtown, it is bounded by Broadway to the east, I-35 to the west, 7th Street to the north, and 14th Street to the south. The Kansas border is half a mile away through the West Bottoms. Since 1978, Quality Hill has been listed as a historic district on the National Register of Historic Places. It includes residences, large businesses (including the headquarters of Kansas City Southern Industries and DST Systems and a large branch of the State Street Corporation), retail establishments, entertainment venues, two cathedrals, and private clubs.

== History ==
Situated within fourteen blocks of the Missouri River, Quality Hill is the oldest established residential area in the Kansas City metropolitan area to remain continuously inhabited.

=== French origins ===
The Chouteau Society, a society dedicated to highlighting Kansas City's French origins, erected a signpost at the northwest corner of 11th and Washington streets, in French and English, which states the corner was the site of an early-18th-century French missionary church, the oldest structure known to have been built by Europeans in the region. This would have been during the era of French fur trappers who traveled the region's rivers. The first recorded church on the site was built in 1822 at the behest of François Chouteau, who is credited as the founder and first Euro-American permanent settler of Kansas City.

Today, the Cathedral of the Immaculate Conception, seat of the Roman Catholic Diocese of Kansas City-St. Joseph, is on the site of Chouteau's church. Known for its gold-covered dome, the cathedral is the oldest standing building on Quality Hill. Two blocks down Washington Street is Grace and Holy Trinity Cathedral, which was built beginning in the 1860s, and serves as the seat of the Episcopal Diocese of West Missouri. Several buildings on Quality Hill date to before the Civil War.

=== Lewis and Clark Expedition ===
On September 15, 1806, the Lewis and Clark Expedition stopped on what is now known as Quality Hill, on its return from the Pacific Ocean. Meriwether Lewis noted in his journal that the site offered a "commanding situation for a fort." Today, the site is commemorated by a large bronze sculpture including a figure of the enslaved man York, the only monument in Missouri to include a slave. Informational signposts and a lookout point are at the north end of Case Park, located at 8th Street and Jefferson Street. The sculpture was made by Eugene Daub.

=== Quality Hill's heyday ===
Between its formal inception as a neighborhood by Kersey Coates in 1857 and a short time after the end of World War I, Quality Hill was the most fashionable and expensive neighborhood in Kansas City. Many of the city's leaders of power and industry lived high on Quality Hill's limestone bluffs in large houses overlooking the West Bottoms below, which contained the city's industrial heart, rail center, and famous stockyards. From Quality Hill they had ready access to their businesses and to the ports of commerce.

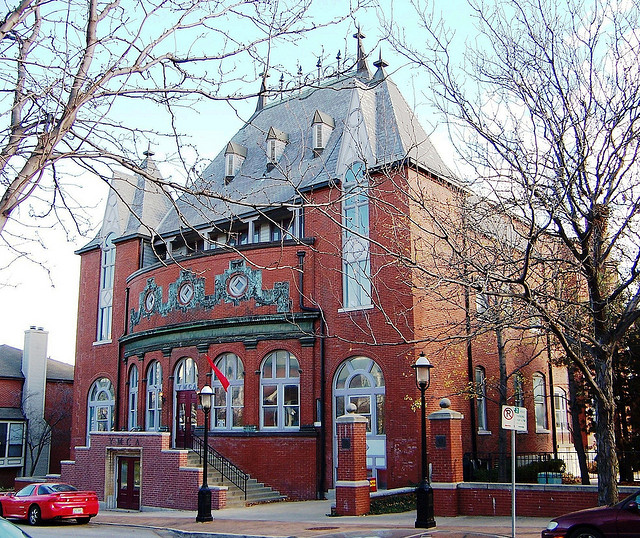
The Progress Club, a Jewish gentlemen's club, was founded in 1881 on Quality Hill, where it remained until 1928; today, the building houses the local YMCA

One figure who greatly influenced Quality Hill's rise was Tom Pendergast, a notorious political boss in the city. In the early 20th century, his brother, Jim Pendergast, a saloon owner in the West Bottoms, began a Democratic Party political machine which soon achieved nearly total power over politics in the region. His chief rival was Joe Shannon. Shannon's faction was nicknamed "the rabbits" because of their connection to the old ways of doing things in lowlands along the rivers (one of the early nicknames for Kansas City was "Rabbitville"), while the Pendergast faction was nicknamed "the goats" because of their desire to climb out of the Bottoms. Tom Pendergast succeeded his brother as boss of the machine.

In 1941, Pendergast arranged for President Franklin D. Roosevelt's Works Progress Administration to build a large park on Quality Hill overlooking the Kansas City Downtown Airport, which also was built during his reign. This park is known as Case Park today, occupying the entire edge of Quality Hill's bluffs. Tom Pendergast commissioned a statue of his brother Jim to be placed in the park, and it still stands. Until the completion of Kansas City International Airport in 1972, Case Park was a popular spot to watch planes take off from the Downtown Airport. One consideration in the decision to build the new airport was the difficulty planes encountered taking off from the Downtown airport, as they had to climb steeply to avoid the 200-foot bluffs and Quality Hill's buildings. The Kansas City Riverfront Bicycle Trail, a 20-mile bicycle route along the Missouri River around downtown Kansas City, also runs through the park and along the bluff.

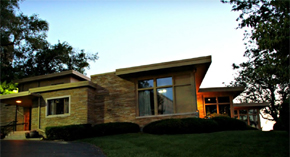
The River Club, founded in 1948 as an exclusive gentlemen's club on Quality Hill

In 1953, the American Hereford Association placed a fiberglass statue of a bull on a 90-foot pylon at its headquarters at 715 Kirk Drive, with President Dwight D. Eisenhower presiding. The bull was nicknamed "Bob" by locals, a name derived from the acronym created by the phrase "bull on building." It either was loved as an icon or reviled as kitsch detracting from the city's beauty. The statue's sculptor was Will Decker with Rochetti and Parzini of New York City, and it was manufactured at the Colonial Plastic Corporation of Newark, New Jersey.

=== Decline and redevelopment ===
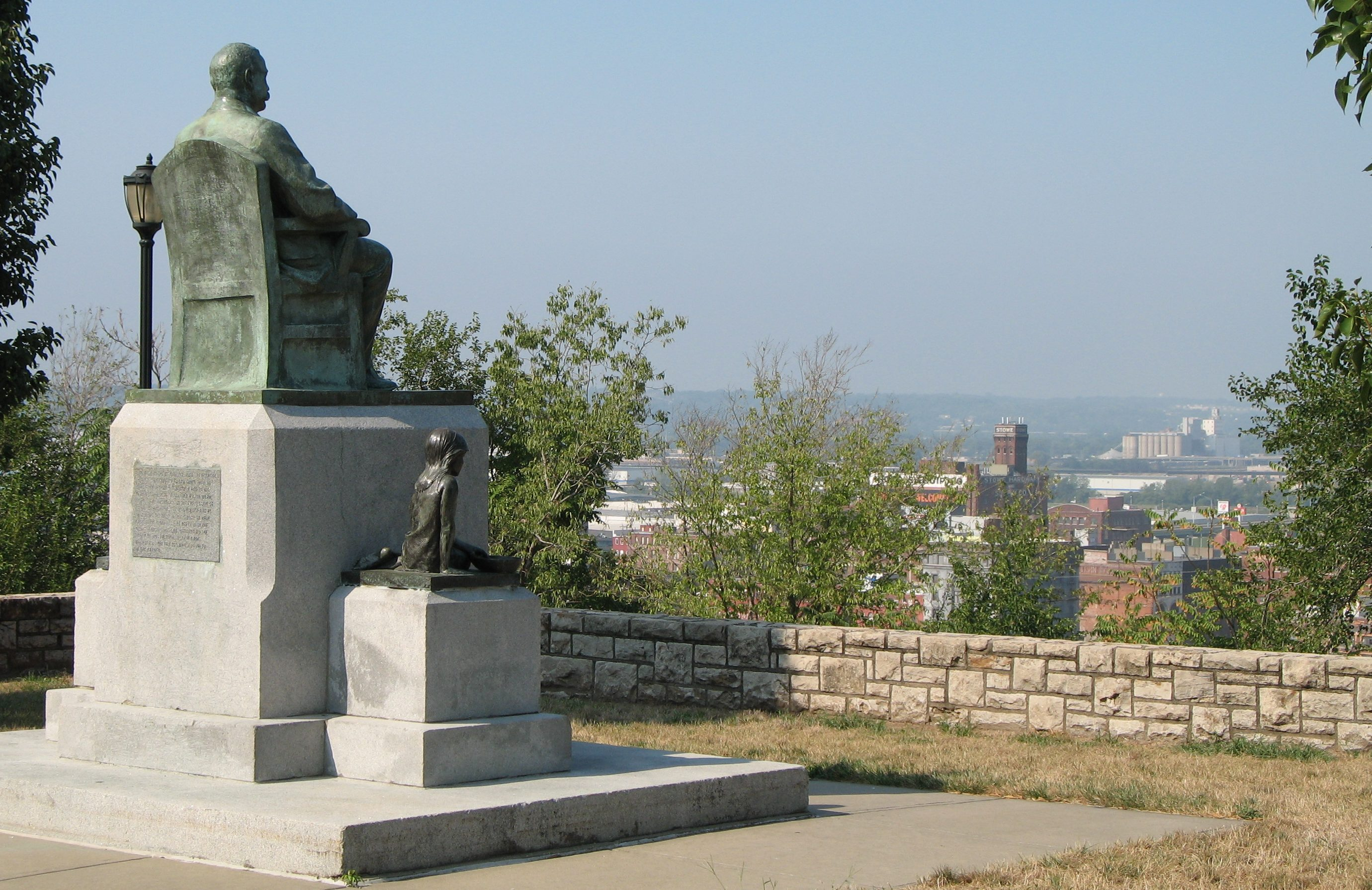
Statue of Jim Pendergast in Case Park overlooking the West Bottoms

Beginning in the 1960s, Downtown Kansas City's population began a steep decline. The city's center of population moved south to the suburbs. Elite who used to live on Quality Hill gradually moved to upscale areas farther south, such as the Country Club Plaza and Sunset Hill. As a result, houses were divided into multiple families, income levels of residents went down, and Quality Hill gradually fell into extreme disrepair.

In the early 1970s, Arnold Garfinkel, a real estate developer, began acquiring and assembling properties and by 1976, he controlled several large parcels. Garfinkle created a report promoting the investment possibilities on Quality Hill. He envisioned a combination of new development and historic renovation. Garfinkel did not implement his ambitious plan, but it served as a catalyst for other investors, who began renovations on several loft buildings. These new developments encouraged the Kansas City LCRA, in 1983, to revise the downtown central business district plan to include the revitalization of the Quality Hill area. That same year, LCRA selected McCormack Baron Salazar, a development company from St. Louis with strong historic preservation experience, to serve as master developer for the effort. The City, in partnership with the neighborhood and a consortium of the Hall Family Foundation, DST Systems, J.E. Dunn and others, acquired nearly all of Quality Hill from Garfinkle and others. McCormack Baron Salazar, as developer, built many new structures, both residential and commercial, and refurbished old ones.

In the 1990s, the architecture firm HNTB bought the American Hereford building for its world headquarters and removed the bull statue from the building. In 2002, HNTB and other firms arranged to have the bull moved across I-35 to Mulkey Square.

In 2004, Kansas City Southern Industries completed a multimillion-dollar new headquarters between the two cathedrals and designed after Quality Hill's distinctive architectural style. Around that time, State Street purchased Quality Hill property from DST Systems and opened a major branch. The Heart of America United Way (the Kansas City Metropolitan Area branch of the United Way) also maintains its headquarters in the heart of Quality Hill, in the former Virginia Hotel and in a 19th-century house along Pennsylvania street. Previously it was also located in a 19th-century house on the corner of Washington Street and 11th Street. In 2016, that location was converted into Quality Hill Academy, a local charter school for grades K-3.

== Today ==
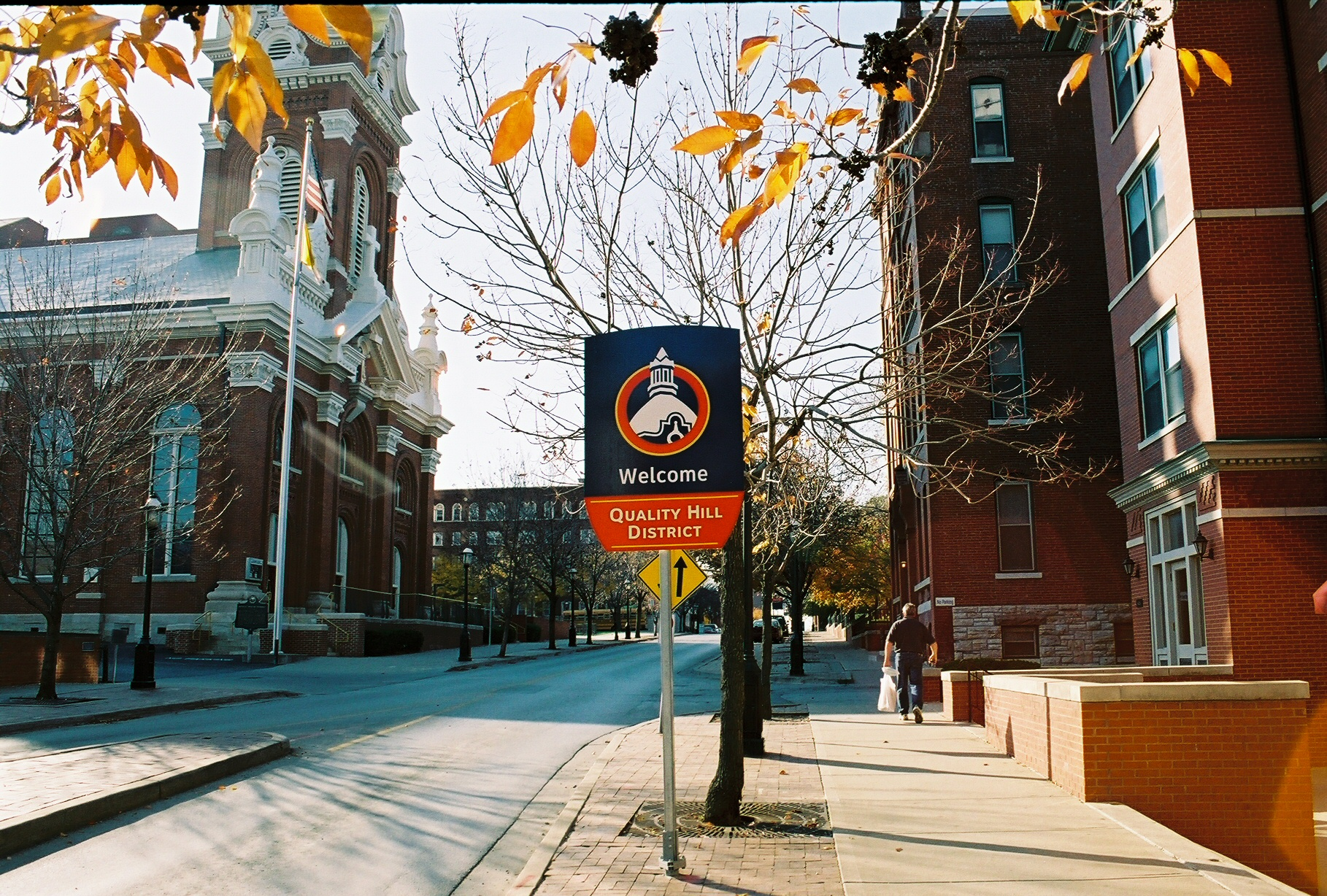
An entrance to Kansas City's Quality Hill neighborhood

Since the late 20th century, Quality Hill has regained its attraction as a highly upscale urban neighborhood. According to Tony Salazar, it is widely regarded as one of the best successes in urban renewal in the United States. Quality Hill's appeal to potential residents is based both in its historic beauty and its ready access to the cultural and business life of downtown Kansas City. Its architecture – both historic and new, reflects Kansas City's origins. It is mostly of a 19th-century French and Federal style, similar to St. Louis's historic Soulard neighborhood.

In February 2008, McCormack Baron Salazar, who owned and managed its large property as a development called New Quality Hill, sold 21 buildings (consisting of 382 residential units to C.R.E.S. Management LLC, a Kansas City-based development company. Its plans were for a major restoration of all the buildings and area landscape. Many other properties are privately owned, including residences and businesses. Quality Hill contains undeveloped land, most of which is owned by DST Systems and the Kauffman Foundation. This property includes several large, often-unused parking lots and many vacant house lots.

The Kauffman Foundation has continued refurbishing its remaining historic buildings for lease. Recently some residents voiced concerns that the New Quality Hill portion of the neighborhood is declining. McCormack Baron Salazar initially said it was working to address those concerns, but in November 2006 decided to sell the bulk of its property on Quality Hill.

As redevelopment of Downtown Kansas City burgeons, and with the population having swelled from 3,000 in 2002 to over 16,000 in 2006, Quality Hill's population continues to grow rapidly (and the cost of living there continues to increase).

The Quality Hill Playhouse features many Broadway and off-Broadway shows.

The River Club, one of two private city clubs on the Missouri side of Kansas City (along with the Kansas City Club in the nearby Library District), is on Quality Hill, on 8th Street between Jefferson Street and Pennsylvania Avenue, near the Lewis and Clark historic site.

== See also ==
- François Chouteau
- Downtown freeway loop (Kansas City)
- List of neighborhoods in Kansas City, Missouri
