= Kaw Point =

Land formation and national park

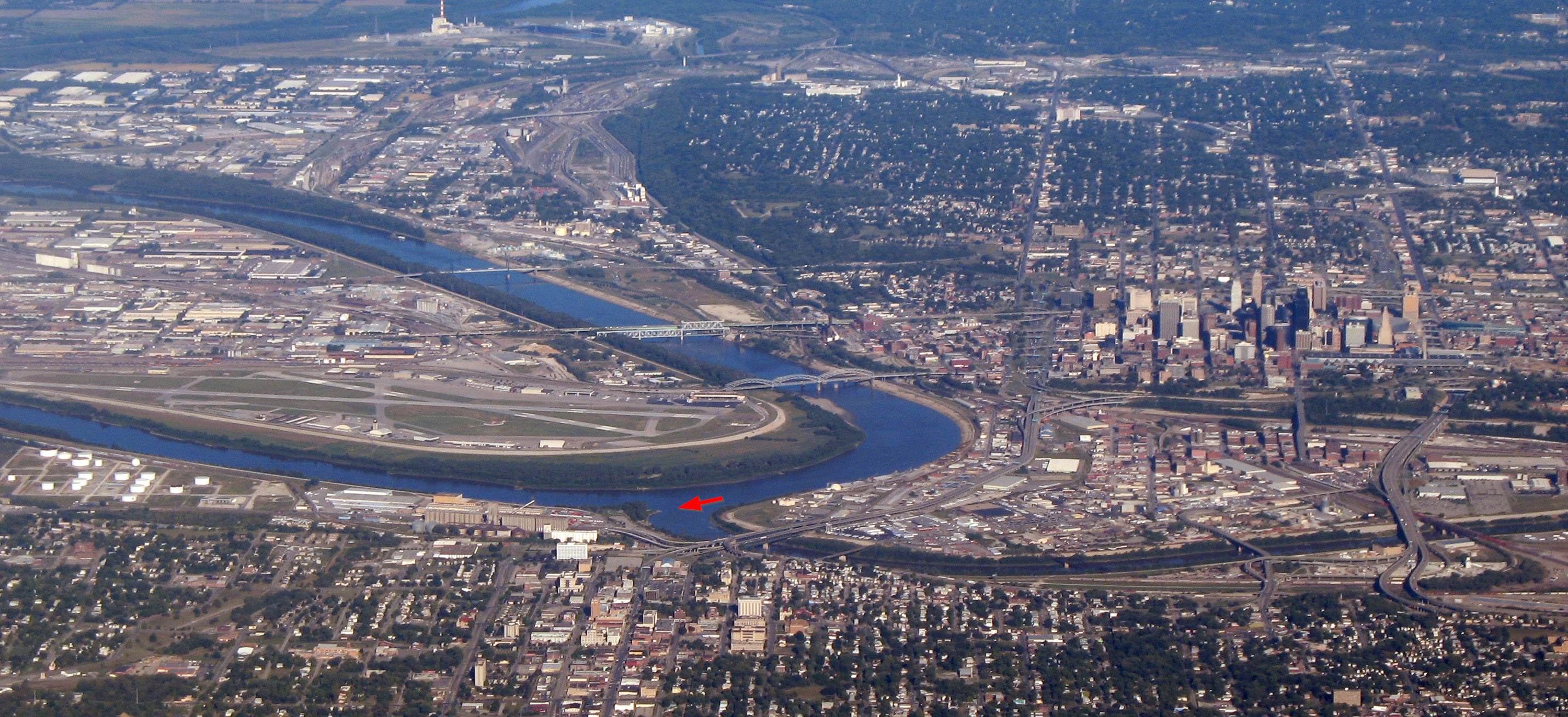
- Kaw Point / Kaw Point Park (highlighted by red arrow)
- Interactive map of Kaw Point
- Type: Urban national park
- Location: Kansas City, Kansas, U.S.
- Coordinates: 39.1165°N 94.6105°W
- Area: 10 acres (4.0 ha)
- Administrator: National Park Service
- Manager: Friends of Kaw Point Park, Inc.
- Paths: Yes
- Website: Official website

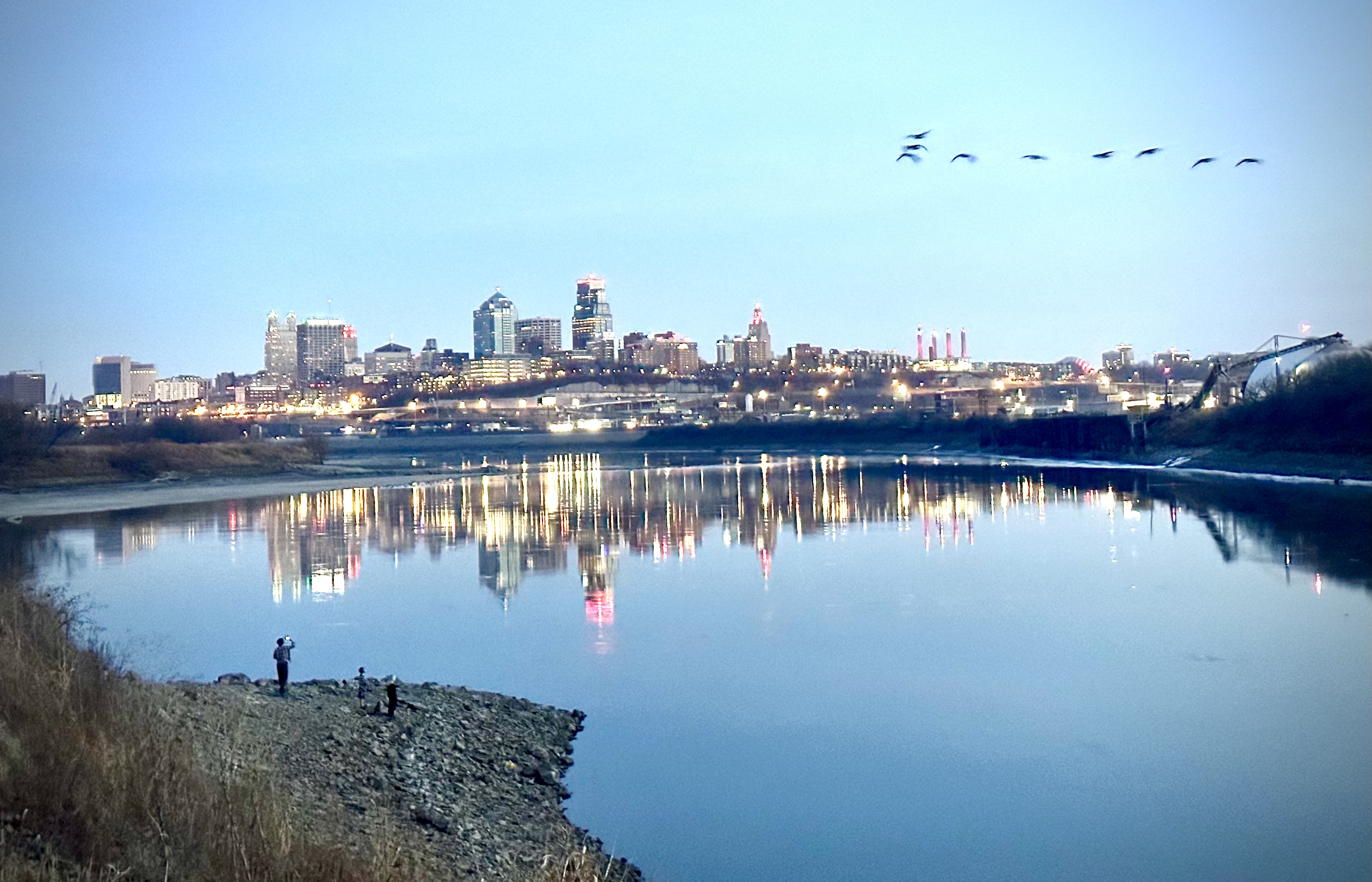
The Kaw Point overlook toward Kansas City, Missouri, is within Kaw Point Park.

Kaw Point is part of Kaw Point Park, in the Fairfax District of Kansas City, Kansas. Kaw Point Park is administered by the National Park Service as a destination along the Lewis and Clark National Historic Trail. The point is along the shores of the confluence of the Kansas River (Kaw River) and the Missouri River, at the eastern termination of the Kansas River, and where the Missouri River turns its southerly course eastward through the state of Missouri to the Mississippi River at St. Louis.

== History ==
Kaw Point is within the land claim bought by the United States as part of the massive Louisiana Purchase in 1803; it was previously claimed by Spain, then by France.

The Lewis and Clark Expedition party camped at Kaw Point from June 26–28, 1804, on its way from St. Louis to the Pacific Ocean. The National Park Service reports the modern belief that at that time, the confluence was located 0.25 miles (0.40 km) north of the present Kaw Point.

Patrick Gass's journal entry for June 26 said: "It was agreed to remain here during the 27th and 28th where we pitched our tents and built [a six-foot-high brush and log] bowers in front of them. Canzan or Kanzas, is 230 yards and a quarter wide, and navigable to a great distance." The team hunted, took calculations, and repaired pirogues. Captain William Clark wrote on June 27, 1804, that "the Countrey [sic] about the mouth of this river is verry [sic] fine." The expedition's journals noted that the location would be appropriate for a fort, and teemed with deer, elk, bison, bear, and many "Parrot queets", the now extinct Carolina parakeet. Lewis observed that the water in the Missouri was muddier than the water from the Kaw.

At 94 degrees 36 minutes west longitude, Kaw Point defined Missouri's western border from Iowa to Arkansas when it became a state in 1821. South of the Missouri River, that longitude still forms the border between Kansas and Missouri. North of the Missouri River, the state of Missouri extended its boundary farther to the west in 1836 with the Platte Purchase.

Kaw Point became part of Kansas Territory in 1854 when the United States Congress passed the Kansas-Nebraska Act, which opened the area for white settlement. In 1859, the city of Wyandotte, which included Kaw Point, was incorporated. Kaw Point became part of Kansas City, Kansas as part of the consolidation of 1886.

The National Park Service established Kaw Point Park, a 10-acre area including Kaw Point, a wooded area, a boat launch ramp, an amphitheater, and a tribal memorial. NPS designated this a Lewis and Clark Destination Site on the Lewis and Clark National Historic Trail.
