= Cathedral of the Immaculate Conception (Kansas City, Missouri) =

Historic church in Missouri, United States

- U.S. Historic district – Contributing property
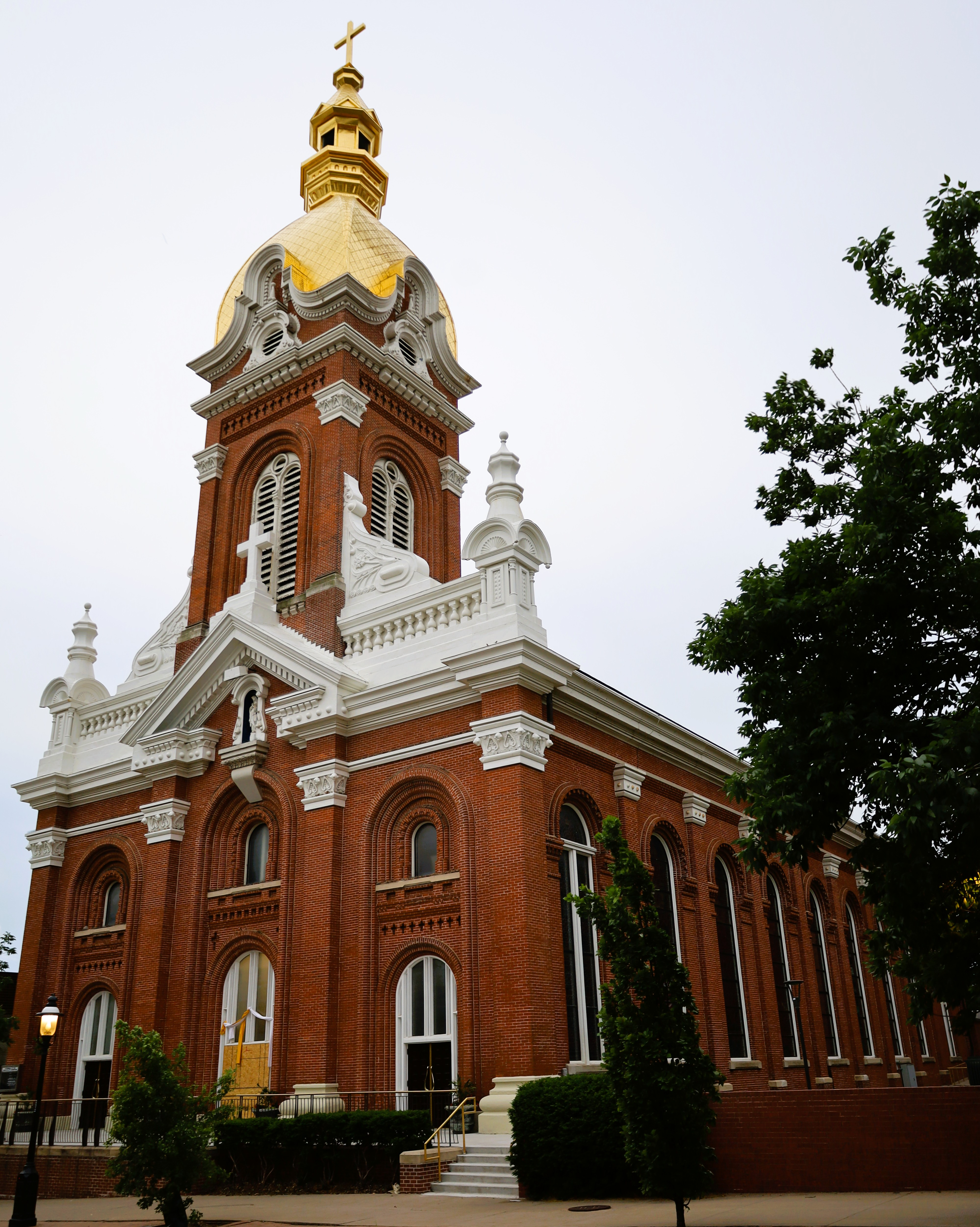
- The cathedral in 2025

- Location within Missouri Location within the United States
- Location: 416 W. 12th Street; Kansas City, Missouri
- Coordinates: 39°6′3″N 94°35′21″W
- Built: 1882–1883
- Part of: Quality Hill, Kansas City (ID78001657)
- Added to NRHP: July 7, 1978

The Cathedral of the Immaculate Conception is a Catholic cathedral in Kansas City, Missouri, in the United States. Along with the Cathedral of St. Joseph it is the seat of the Diocese of Kansas City-St. Joseph.

== History ==
=== St. John Francis Regis Church ===
The Cathedral of the Immaculate Conception was preceded by St. John Francis Regis Church, the first Catholic church in Kansas City, then part of the Diocese of St. Louis. It was a 20 by 30 feet (6.1 by 9.1 m) log structure at Eleventh and Broadway constructed by Reverend Benedict Roux in 1835. The new church cost $500. At that time, only nine Catholic families lived in Kansas City. Roux left Kansas City later that year and the small church was effectively abandoned.

=== Original cathedral ===
In 1845, Reverend Bernard Donnelly, a circuit-riding priest, took over the parish. Seeing the need for a larger church, he started construction of a larger brick church in 1857 on the site of the log church. He hired 300 Irish day laborers to level the church site and create a bricks work to produce bricks. The completed 30 by 70 feet (9.1 by 21.3 m) church was named Immaculate Conception.

In 1864, during the American Civil War, several nervous parishioners asked Donnelly to safeguard their money. In response, he buried the money in the church cemetery. However, he was unable to locate it later. Donnelly borrowed money from a bank to reimburse the parishioners.

The Diocese of Kansas City was established by Pope Leo XIII in 1880. Bishop John Joseph Hogan selected Immaculate Conception Church as the cathedral for the new diocese. However, he immediately started planning for a larger cathedral.

=== Current cathedral ===
In 1882, Hogan laid the cornerstone for the second Cathedral of the Immaculate Conception. The second Cathedral of the Immaculate Conception was dedicated in May 1883. However, the cathedral walls remained un-plastered and the windows were covered with temporary covers. While the cathedral interior was incomplete and temporary windows filled the spaces, the diocese celebrated the first mass in Cathedral of the Immaculate Conception church was celebrated in 1883. The cathedral was built on the highest ground of the city and at 150 feet (37.6 m) was then the tallest structure in Kansas City. During the early years, the parish sold tickets to allowing residents to climb the steps in the tower to see the view.

The diocese installed a carillon of eleven bells in the bell tower in 1895. In 1903, the cathedral parish opened Christopher's Inn, a boarding hours for homeless men. The stained glass windows were finally installed in the nave in 1912. They were created at the Kansas City Stained Glass Works Company.

Bishop Edwin V. O’Hara led a major renovation of the cathedral's interior in 1955. On August 29, 1956, Pope Pius XII merged the western part of the Diocese of St. Joseph with part of Diocese of Kansas City to form the Diocese of Kansas City–St. Joseph.As a result, the Diocese of Kansas City-St. Joseph now had two co-cathedrals: the Cathedral of the Immaculate Conception and the Cathedral of St. Joseph in St. Joseph, Missouri.

By the 1950s, the copper dome on the cathedral tower had started to deteriorate. Bishop John Cody in 1969 replaced it with a new dome, cupola and cross covered in 23-carat gold leaf. The diocese in 2001 began a capital campaign, Gift of Faith, to fund a major renovation and restoration of the cathedral. Bishop Raymond J. Boland dedicated the renovated cathedral on February 23, 2003.

The diocese in 2023 began a major repurposing of the cathedral campus. A former school building, a garage and the rectory on the campus were demolished. In its place, the diocese constructed the Father Donnelly Parish Hall, a two-story 18,900 square feet (1,760 m^{2}) facility to house the diocesan administrative offices and hold parish events. Donnelly Hall was dedicated in August 2024.

The cathedral is a contributing property in the Quality Hill neighborhood, which is listed on the National Register of Historic Places.

Cathedral images

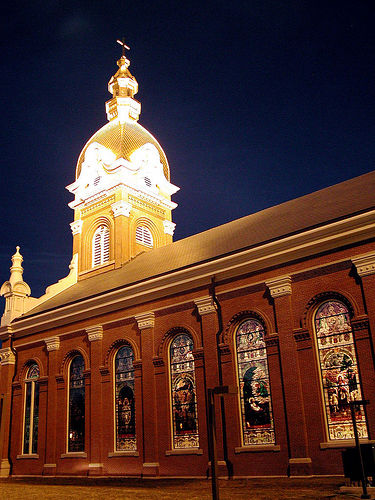
Cathedral at night (2007)

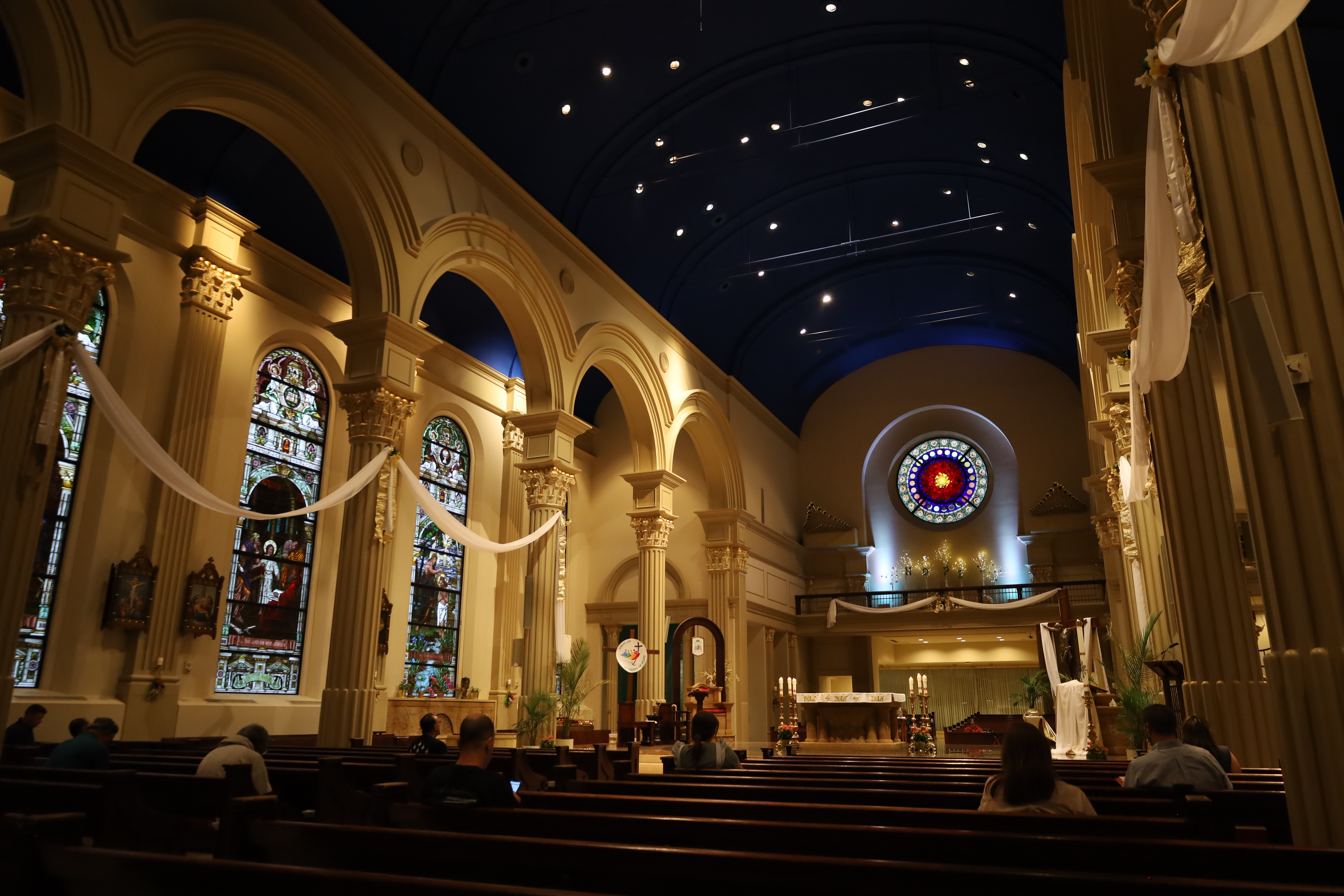
Nave facing the front (2025)

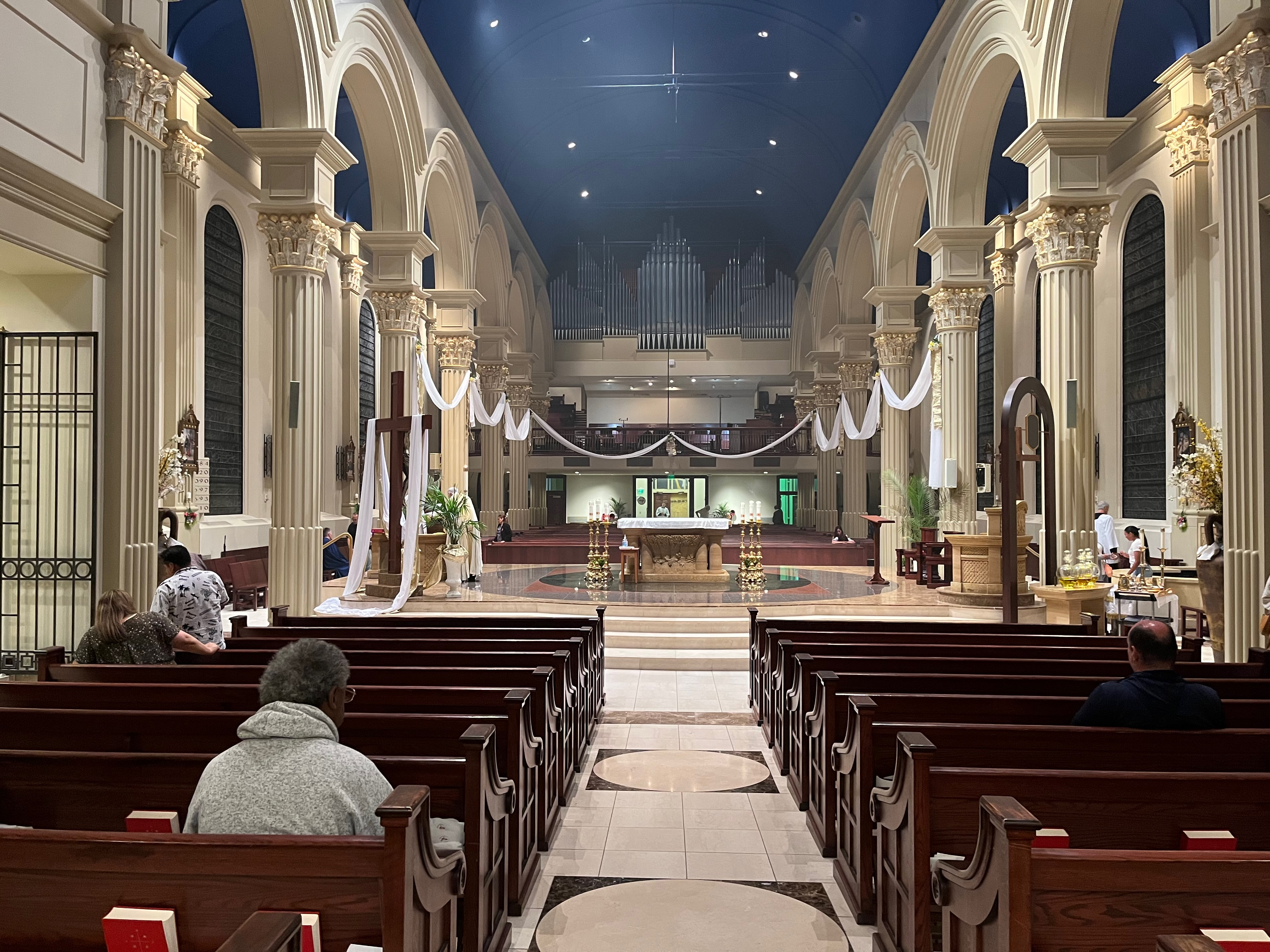
Nave facing the rear (2025)

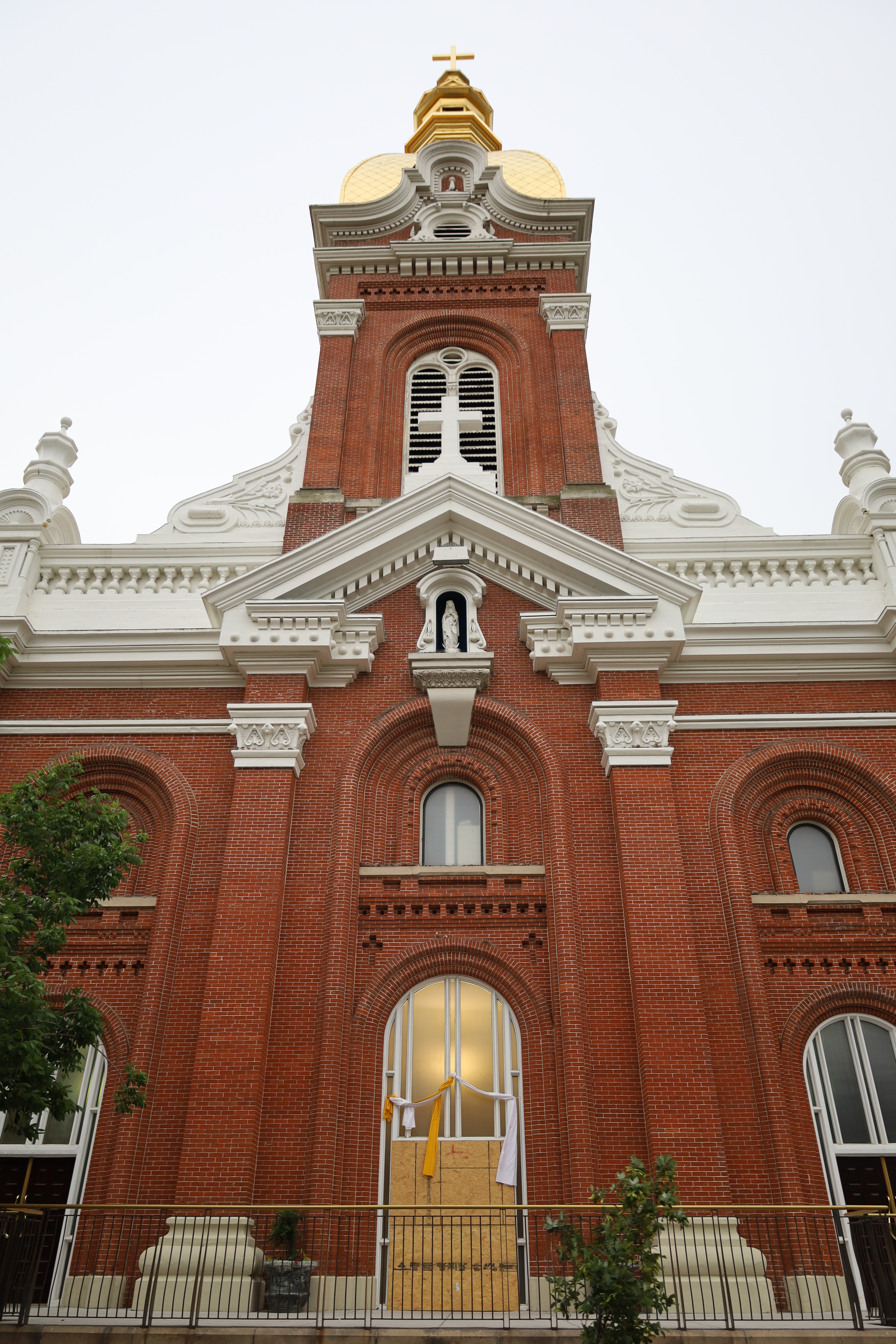
Front entrance (2025)

== Cathedral exterior ==
=== Bells ===
The cathedral bells are named after the following saints:

- St. Anna – the mother of the Virgin Mary
- Bernard of Clairvaux – Burgundian co-founder of the Knights Templar in the 12th century
- St. Catherine
- Cecelia of Rome – Roman martyr from the 3rd century CE
- Edward the Confessor – King of England during the 11th century
- St. Elizabeth – The mother of the prophet John the Baptist
- Helena of Constantinople – The Roman woman who in the 3rd century CE helped spread Christianity in the Eastern Meditteranean.
- St. John
- Mary, mother of Jesus
- Thomas the Apostle. The largest bell, St. Thomas is rung more than the others.

== See also ==
- List of Catholic cathedrals in the United States
- List of cathedrals in the United States
