= Great Flood of 1844 =

Missouri and Mississippi River flood

The Great Flood of 1844 yielded the biggest water discharge in recorded history of the Missouri River and Upper Mississippi River in North America. The adjusted economic impact was not as great as subsequent floods because of the small population in the region at the time. The flood devastation was particularly widespread since the region had few levees at the time, so the waters were able to spread far from the normal banks. The highest mortality rates included the Wyandot Indians, with 100 deaths from the diseases after the flood in the vicinity of what became Kansas City, Kansas.

Earlier in 1844, "by the first of May", the Mississippi River's banks overflowed and "By the 6th, the people of St. Louis began to be severely alarmed", until the water level lowered. However, "a succession of violent rain storms commenced on the 3rd of June" and by June 12, the riverbanks overflowed and people evacuated. The floods receded on June 28, and the crisis ended by the middle of July.

The flood formed a large sandbar in front of the Wayne City Landing at Independence, Missouri, causing settlers to go further west to Westport Landing, which resulted in significant local economic and cultural impact. Independence had been the trailhead for several key emigrant trails, prior to 1846, both the Santa Fe Trail and one alternative eastern starting branch of the Oregon Trail. After the Mexican–American War treaty of 1848, the Oregon Trail's trailhead became a trailhead of the California Trail and an alternative beginning for the Mormon Trail.

In 1850, the United States Congress passed the Swamp Land Act providing land grants to build stronger levees.

The flood is the highest recorded for the Mississippi River at St. Louis. The discharge was 1,300,000 cubic feet per second (37,000 m^{3}/s) in 1844, while 782,000 cu ft/s (22,100 m^{3}/s) in 1951 and 1,030,000 cu ft/s (29,000 m^{3}/s) in 1993.

== Other floods ==
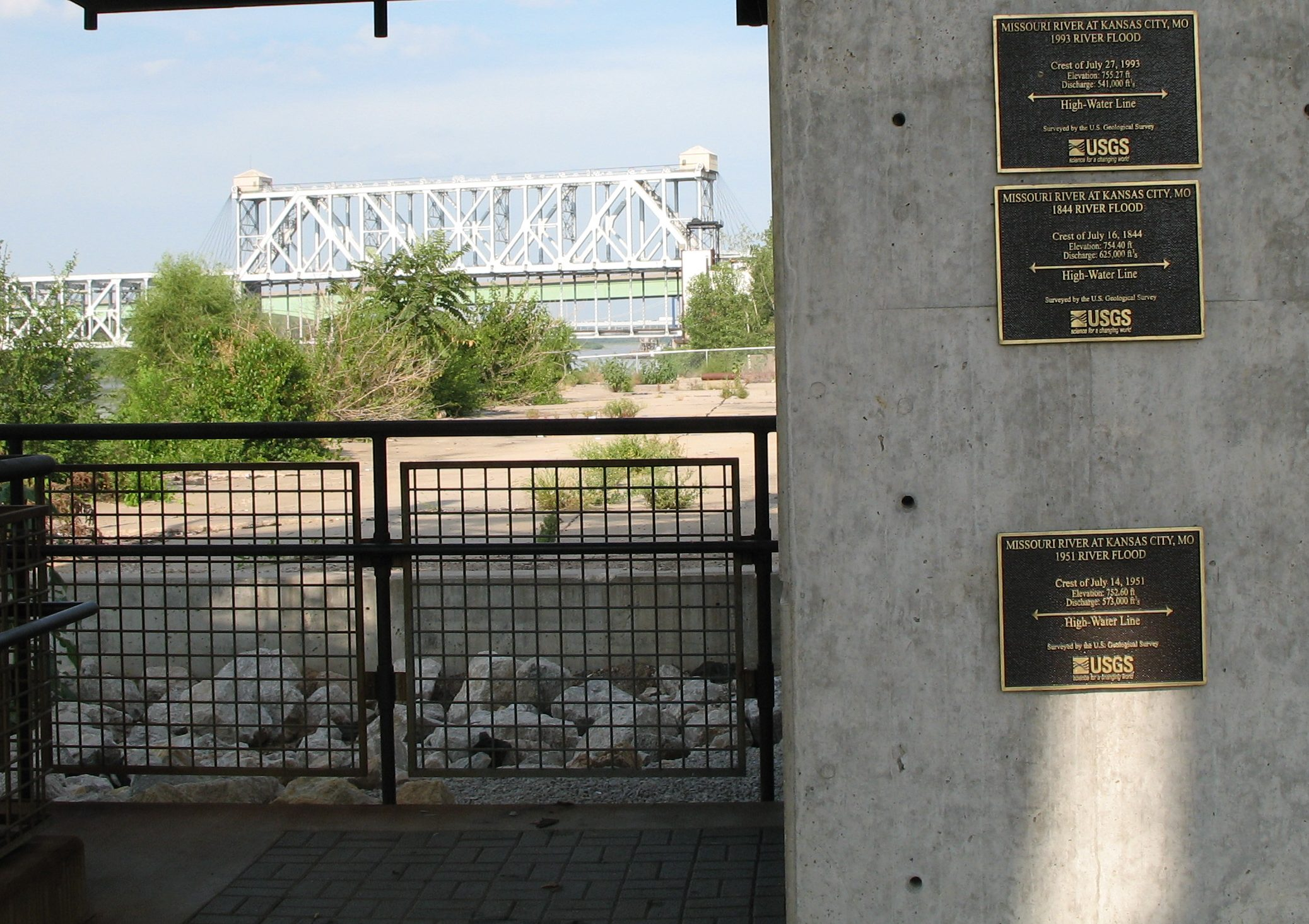
This USGS exhibit shows flood crest levels at Westport Landing on the Missouri River at what later became Kansas City.

Over time, channeling and levee construction have altered how floods affect various areas along the Missouri River. For example, here is a comparison of flood data at – and associated impacts on – the area that became Kansas City for three big floods since the early 19th century.

- Flood of 1851 — The Great Flood of 1851 was most severe in Iowa, and it affected the Missouri and Mississippi river basins. In St. Louis, Missouri, on June 11, 1851, floodwaters rose to within 5 feet (1.5 m) of the 1844 flood, while at Cape Girardeau, Missouri, the flooding was worse than in 1844.
- Great Flood of 1951 — The 1951 flood was the second biggest in terms of discharge at 573,000 cubic feet per second (16,200 m^{3}/s). The 1951 crest on July 14, 1951, was almost 2 feet (0.61 metres) lower than the 1844 flood and three feet lower than the 1993 flood. However, the flood was the most devastating of all modern floods for Kansas City since its levee system was not built to withstand it. It destroyed the city's stockyards and forced the building of an airport away from the Missouri River bottoms.
- Great Flood of 1993 — The 1993 flood was the highest recorded but had a lower rate of discharge at 541,000 cubic feet per second (15,300 m^{3}/s). While the 1993 flood had devastating impacts elsewhere, Kansas City survived it relatively well because of levee improvements after the 1951 flood.

== See also ==
- Floods in the United States
