= Missouri Route 269 =

Missouri state highway

Route 269
- Chouteau Trafficway

Route information
- Maintained by MoDOT
- Length: 3.320 mi (5.343 km)
- Existed: 1953–present

Major junctions
- South end: Front Street in Kansas City
- Route 210 in North Kansas City
- North end: I-35 in Kansas City

Location
- Country: United States
- State: Missouri
- Counties: Jackson, Clay

Highway system
- Missouri State Highway System; Interstate; US; State; Supplemental
← Route 267	→ I-270

Missouri Route 269 is a highway in the Kansas City metropolitan area. Its total length is three miles (4.8 km), which is also entirely named Chouteau Trafficway as a segment of that much longer trafficway. The highway's northern terminus is at Interstate 35 (I-35) and its southern terminus is at Front Street—both in Kansas City, Missouri. The middle of the route includes an interchange with Route 210 in the city of North Kansas City, Missouri.

Chouteau Trafficway is very narrow for its amount of traffic, so in mid-2011, all buildings on Chouteau Trafficway between NE Parvin Road and NE Winn Road were taken by eminent domain and razed to widen Route 269 into a four-lane boulevard.

== Route description ==
Route 269 begins at an intersection with Front Street in Kansas City, Jackson County, heading northwest on four-lane undivided Chouteau Trafficway. The road passes through industrial areas, with a pair of ramps providing access to Levee Road. The route crosses the Missouri River into the city of North Kansas City, Missouri in Clay County, where it has an interchange with Route 210. Past this interchange, Route 269 heads back into Kansas City, Missouri and becomes a two-lane undivided road, passing businesses. The route continues north through residential and commercial areas, then widens into a four-lane divided highway and reaches its northern terminus at an interchange with I-35. Chouteau Trafficway continues north of I-35 as an unnumbered road.

== Major intersections ==
County	Location	mi	km	Destinations	Notes
Jackson	Kansas City	0.000	0.000	Front Street	
Clay	North Kansas City	1.528– 1.545	2.459– 2.486	Route 210	Interchange
Clay	Kansas City	3.288– 3.302	5.292– 5.314	I-35	I-35 Exit 9
Clay	Kansas City	3.320	5.343	Chouteau Trafficway north	Continuation beyond I-35
1.000 mi = 1.609 km; 1.000 km = 0.621 mi
