= Jay B. Dillingham =

Jay B. Dillingham (March 8, 1910 – August 13, 2007) was a former president of the Kansas City Stockyards as well as former president of the Chamber of Commerce for both Kansas City, Missouri and Kansas City, Kansas.

Dillingham was born in Platte City, Missouri. His grandfather was the only sheriff of Platte County, Missouri ever to be killed (in 1900) while on duty.

He received a law degree from the University of Missouri-Kansas City in 1935.

He married Frances Thompson, a daughter of a founder of the American Royal, in 1935. On their first date they went to a horse show.

He joined the stockyard in 1937 and was president of the stockyards from 1948 until 1975. During his tenure he started the Golden Ox Restaurant in the stockyards the Livestock Exchange Building which developed fame for the Kansas City strip steak. He also dealt with the Great Flood of 1951 that destroyed the stockyards from which it never fully recovered. He once said about the stockyards:

"There's nothing around here I haven't done...from shoveling manure to cleaning the sewers."

Following the flood he was instrumental in locating what would become Kansas City International Airport to his native Platte County to replace the Fairfax Airport which had been damaged in the flood. He worked the Kansas City office of the United States Army Corps of Engineers to build a series of reservoirs in Missouri and Kansas including Smithville Lake

Dillingham donated stockyards land to the American Royal and for Kemper Arena.

Interstate 670 in Kansas and Missouri is named for him.
