= Golden Ox =

- Interactive map of Golden Ox

Restaurant information
- Established: 1949; 77 years ago
- Owners: Wes Gartner, Jill Myers
- Food type: Steakhouse
- Location: 1600 Genessee St. #100, Kansas City, Missouri, 64102, USA
- Coordinates: 39.0946°N 94.6052°W
- Website: Official website

The Golden Ox is a steakhouse restaurant located in the Kansas City Live Stock Exchange building in the West Bottoms neighborhood of Kansas City, Missouri. Founded in 1949, the Golden Ox is the birthplace of the Kansas City strip steak. The Golden Ox is considered the oldest steakhouse in Kansas City, because though Jess & Jim's Steakhouse had opened more than one decade earlier in 1938, its Martin City neighborhood was not annexed into Kansas City until 1963. The original Golden Ox location closed permanently following dinner on December 20, 2014. On June 8, 2018, new owners leased the space and reopened the Golden Ox in a renovated portion of the original space.

== History ==
The Golden Ox opened on the first floor of the Kansas City Live Stock Exchange building in May 1949. Founded by Jay Dillingham and owned by the Kansas City Stockyard Company, the restaurant originally catered to ranchers and farmers who brought their cattle to the stockyards. Dillingham also used the restaurant as a place to entertain dignitaries, including Harry S. Truman and Dwight D. Eisenhower. The restaurant closed briefly due to the Great Flood of 1951. In 1957, the Golden Ox expanded when a one-story addition was added to the south side of the livestock exchange building to accommodate the restaurant expansion.

Jerry Rauschelbach and Steve Greer purchased the Golden Ox from Rauschelbach's father Bill in 1997. It closed in November 2003 without warning. Rauschelbach cited high beef prices, fewer people dining out, and overall poor economic conditions. The restaurant was purchased and reopened two weeks later by a group of investors led by Bill Teel and Steve Greer. Greer retired in August 2014. In December 2014, the Golden Ox announced permanent closure before the end of the year. Landlord Bill Haw indicated that the Golden Ox was behind on rent, and Haw planned to pursue a different restaurant or entertainment concept for the restaurant space in the livestock exchange building.

Following the 2014 closing of the restaurant, the space was divided, and Stockyards Brewing Co. planned to open in the south portion of the space, which was previously the bar area and one of the back dining areas. In November 2015, it was announced that Wes Gartner and Jill Myers signed a lease for the remaining 5,000-square-foot space, including the main dining room and kitchen on the north side of the original Golden Ox space. Gartner and Myers are also co-owners of Voltaire in West Bottoms. They announced plans to re-open the Golden Ox, including major renovation for a wood-fired grill in a semi-open kitchen. Livestock Exchange Building owner Bill Haw stated that the new owners of the Golden Ox would have access to any furnishing or memorabilia from the previous Golden Ox restaurant. After the renovation, it reopened in June 2018.

== Other locations ==
In the late 1950s and into the 1960s, the owners opened locations in Denver, Colorado, Washington, D.C., and Nashville, Tennessee.

In 2003, while the Golden Ox was owned by Jerry Rauschelbach, a short-lived second location was opened at 95th Street and Metcalf Ave in Overland Park, Kansas, that had formerly housed Houston's restaurant. This location closed in November 2003, citing the bad economy and fewer people dining out.

In May 2013, owner Bill Teel opened the Ox Bar & Grill at an almost abandoned dining room in the Clarion Hotel at 7000 West 108th Street in Overland Park, Kansas. The location at the Clarion Hotel has some similarities with the original Golden Ox, but Teel stressed that it is a separate restaurant geared toward hotel guests and not a second location of the iconic Golden Ox.
