= Kansas City Overhaul Base =

Manufacturing plant in Kansas City, Missouri, USA

Coordinates: 39.295284°N 94.696677°W

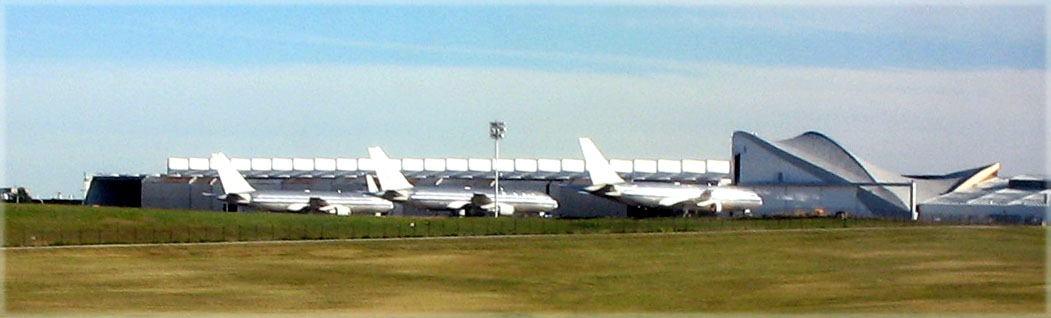
The hangar area with the two wide body hangars in 2007

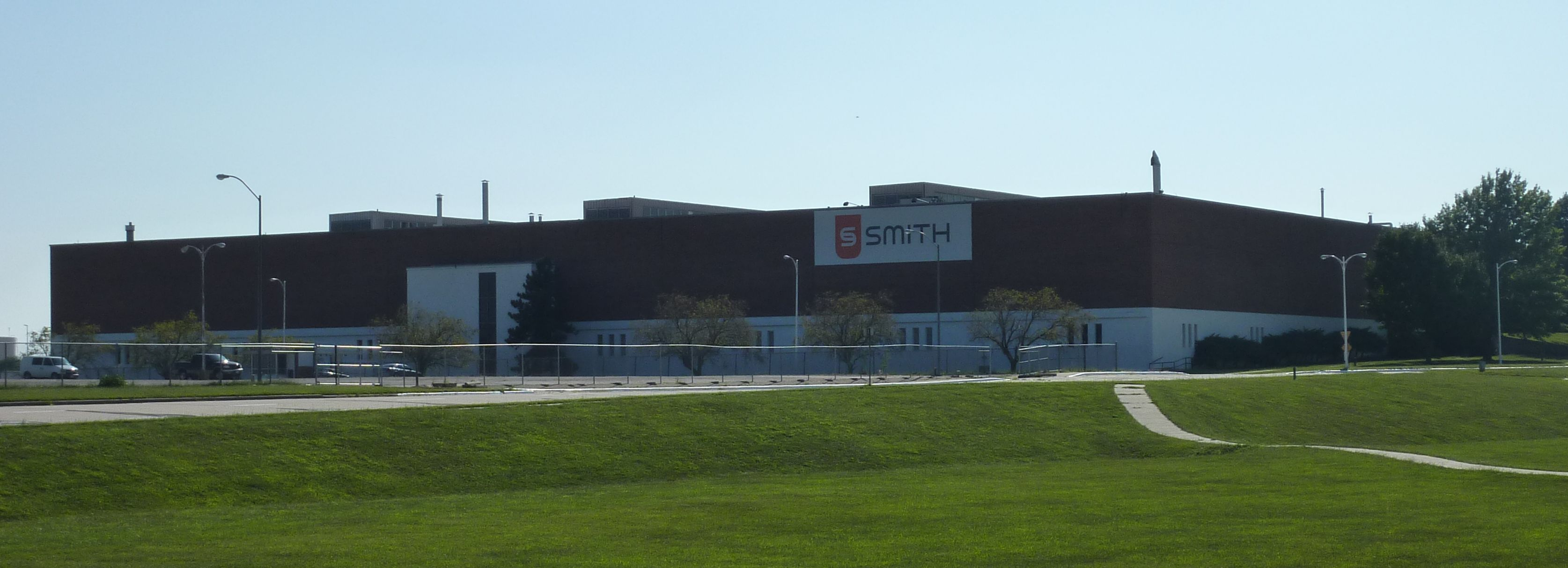
Smith Electric United States headquarters and factory in the main building

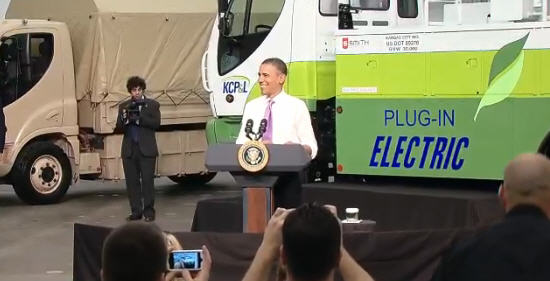
Barack Obama visiting the Kansas City plant on July 8, 2010

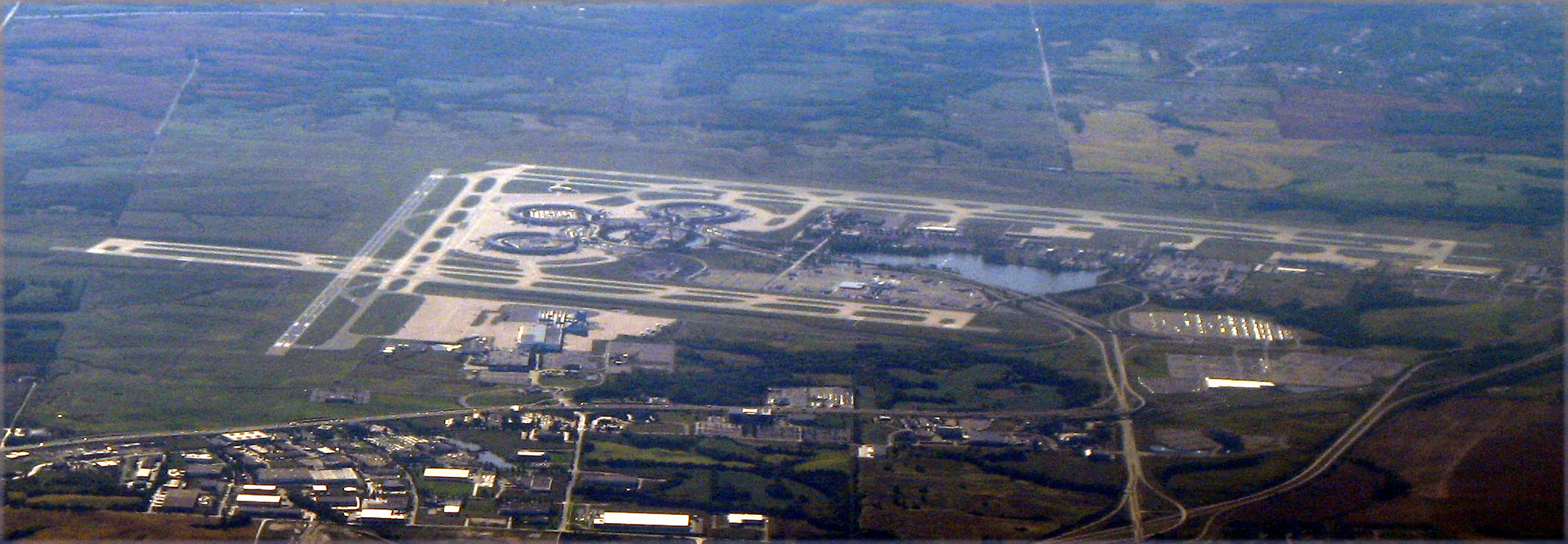
The overhaul base is in the lower left of the photo next to Interstate 29.

The Kansas City Overhaul Base is a 1.7-million-square-foot (160,000 m^{2}) manufacturing and maintenance plant adjacent to Kansas City International Airport.

At its peak in the 1960s and 1970s, the facility employed more than 6,000 people who worked on maintaining and repairing the entire fleet of Trans World Airlines (and other airlines under contract), and it was Kansas City's biggest employer. Since TWA's successor American Airlines began downsizing in preparation for a total abandonment effective September 2010, three companies moved their headquarters and plants into the complex (Smith Electric Vehicles (US), Jet Midwest and Nordic Windpower). Frontier Airlines leased two narrow-body hangars.

== History ==
The plant along with the airport opened in 1957 at a cost of $25 million and was marked an attempt to keep TWA in Kansas City following the Great Flood of 1951 which had destroyed TWA's facilities at Fairfax Airport close to the Missouri River. TWA's plant had been in the former North American Aviation B-25 Mitchell bomber plant at Fairfax. TWA labeled the building MCIE (after the airport's original name of Mid-Continent International Airport). The airline also moved its large overhaul operations at the New Castle County Airport in Delaware to Kansas City.

In 1973, when the airport opened to replace Kansas City Downtown Airport as the city's main airport, TWA also added its distinctive sloped wide-body hangars.

When American Airlines acquired financially bankrupt TWA in 2001, TWA had 2,600 employees at the base.

In 2008, American moved about 500 of its remaining 1,000 employees to Tulsa, Oklahoma and American formally cut the ties in September 2010. Barack Obama visited the Smith Electric part of the plant to tout the $32 million in stimulus funding granted to Smith to locate to the structure.

Kansas City says that 1 million feet (300,000 m) have been leased.

In 2009, Kansas City broke ground on the KCI Intermodal Center, Kansas City SmartPort foreign trade zone on 800 acres (320 ha) across Runway 9/27 directly south of the plant being developed by Trammell Crow Company.
