= Kansas City International Airport =

Airport serving Kansas City, Missouri, United States

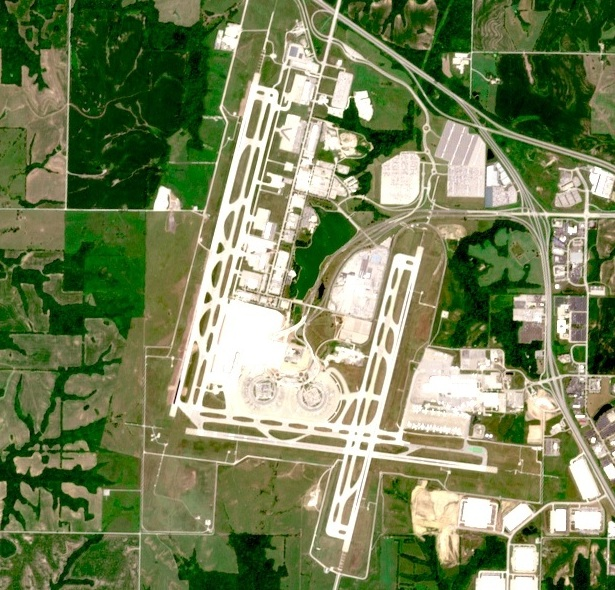
- Satellite view of the airport in 2022
- IATA: MCI; ICAO: KMCI; FAA LID: MCI

Summary
- Airport type: Public
- Owner/Operator: Kansas City Aviation Department
- Serves: Kansas City metropolitan area
- Location: Kansas City, Missouri, U.S.
- Opened: November 11, 1972; 54 years ago
- Elevation AMSL: 1,026 ft (313 m)
- Coordinates: 39°17′51″N 94°42′50″W
- Website: flykc.com

Maps
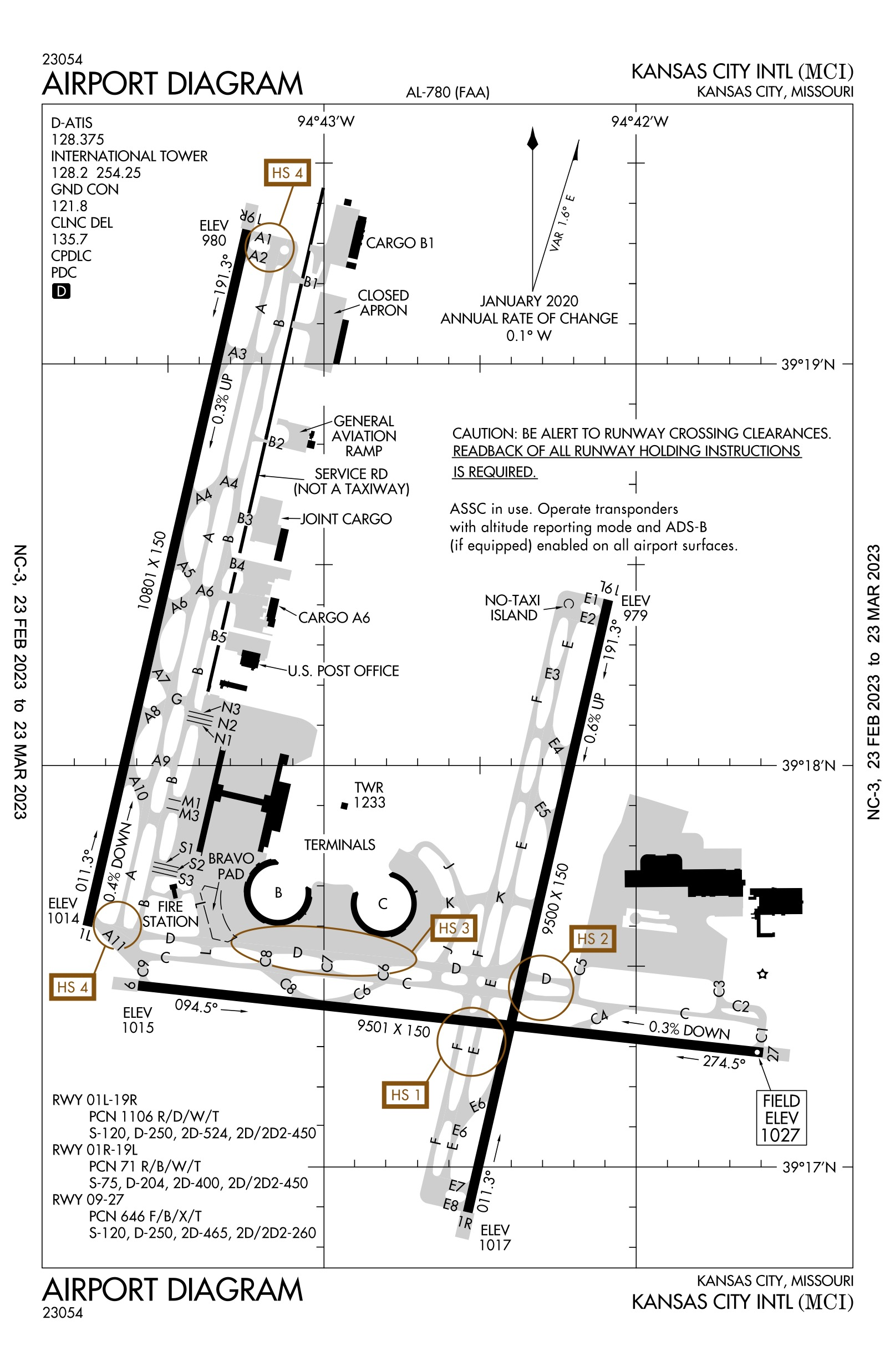
- FAA airport diagram
- Interactive map of Kansas City International Airport

Runways
Direction	Length		Surface
Direction	ft	m	Surface
01L/19R	10,801	3,292	Asphalt
01R/19L	9,500	2,896	Concrete
09/27	9,501	2,896	Asphalt

Statistics (2025)
- Passengers: 11,459,954 ▼5.46%
- Aircraft operations: 117,030
- Total cargo (freight+mail)(lbs.): 247,468,761
- Source: KCI Traffic Statistics

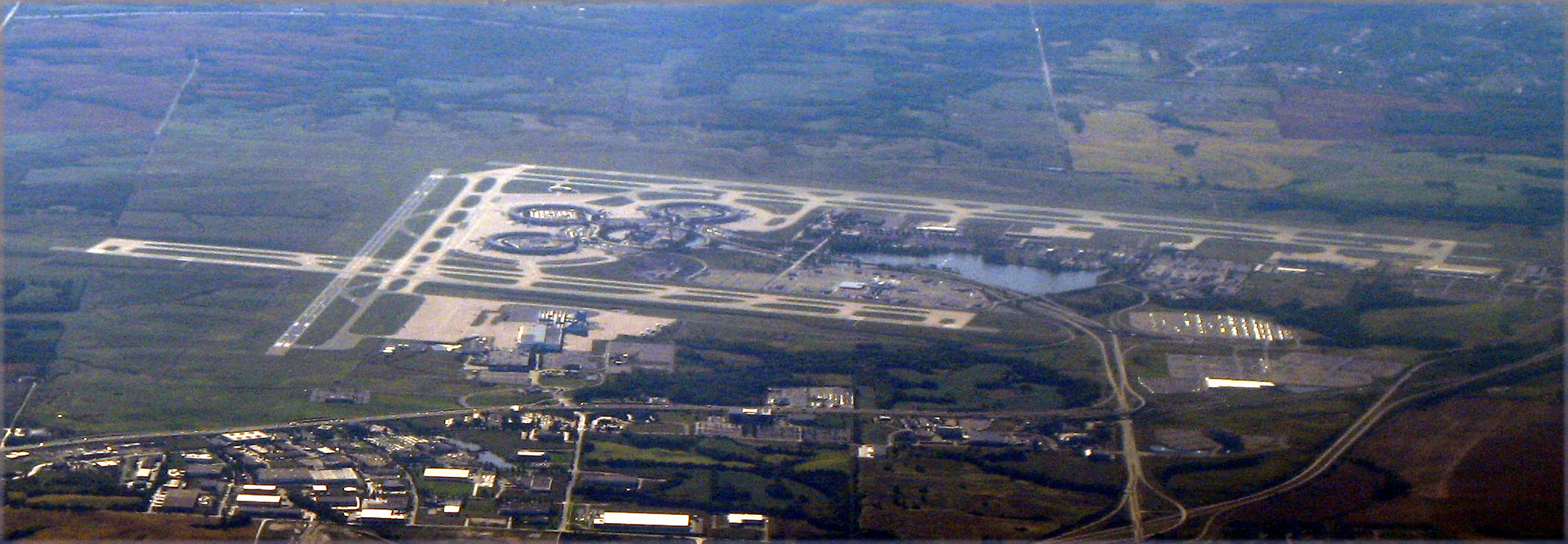
Airport from the east

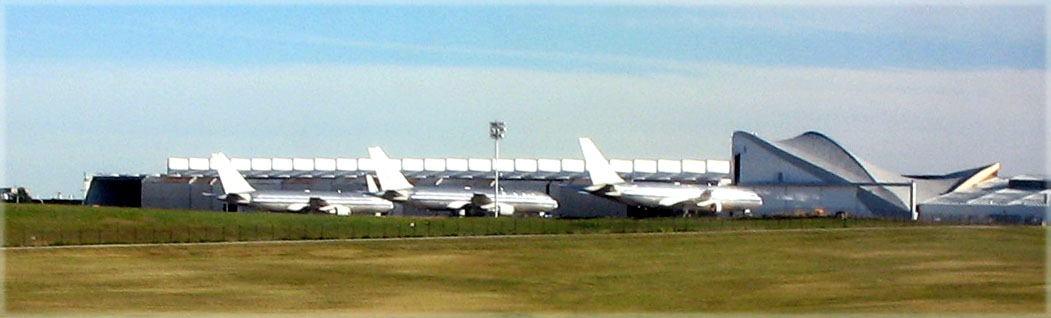
Kansas City Overhaul Base in 2007

Kansas City International Airport (IATA: MCI, ICAO: KMCI, FAA LID: MCI) — originally Mid-Continent International Airport and often referred to by locals as KCI — is an international airport in Kansas City, Missouri, located 15 miles (24 km) northwest of Downtown Kansas City in Platte County, Missouri. The airport was opened in 1972 and a new complex in the airport was completed in 2023, replacing the old one. MCI replaced Kansas City Municipal Airport (MKC) in 1972, with all scheduled passenger airline flights moved from MKC to MCI. It serves the Kansas City Metropolitan Area and is the primary passenger airport for much of western Missouri and eastern Kansas.

The airport covers 10,680 acres (16.7 sq mi; 43.2 km^{2}) and has three runways. The airport has always been a civilian airport and has never been assigned an Air National Guard unit. Since the 2020 pandemic shutdown, the number of peak-day scheduled aircraft departures has been steadily recovering. As of October 2022, there were 303 daily arrivals and departures. Nonstop service was offered to 47 airports, including Cancún, Montego Bay, and San José del Cabo.

MCI is also a former hub for Braniff, Eastern, Midwest, TWA, and Vanguard, all of which have since shut down.

== History ==
=== Beginnings ===
Kansas City Industrial Airport was built after the Great Flood of 1951 destroyed the facilities of both of Kansas City's airlines, Mid-Continent Airlines and TWA, at Fairfax Municipal Airport. The facilities were across the Missouri River from the city's main Kansas City Municipal Airport, which was not as badly damaged. TWA's main overhaul base was a former B-25 bomber factory at Fairfax, and TWA commercial flights flew out of the main downtown airport.

Subsequently Kansas City planned to build an airport with room for 10,000-foot (3,000 m) runways and knew the downtown airport would not be large enough.

Kansas City already owned Grandview Airport south of the city with ample room for expansion, but the city chose to build a new airport north of the city away from the Missouri River following lobbying by Platte County native Jay B. Dillingham, president of the Kansas City Stockyards, which had also been destroyed in the flood. TWA moved its Fairfax plant to the new airport and also its overseas overhaul operations at New Castle County Airport in Delaware.

The site just north of the then-unincorporated hamlet of Hampton, Missouri, was picked in May 1953 (with an anticipated cost of $23 million) under the guidance of City Manager L.P. Cookingham. Ground was broken in September 1954. The first runway opened in 1956; at about the same time the city donated the southern Grandview Airport to the United States Air Force to become Richards-Gebaur Air Force Base.

TWA's Kansas City Overhaul Base at its peak in the 1960s and 1970s was Kansas City's largest employer, with 6,000 employees.

Although Mid-Continent merged with Braniff in 1952, Kansas City named the new airport on the basis of Mid-Continent's historic roots of serving the Mid-continent Oil Field. Mid-Continent had renamed from Hanover Airlines in 1938 after moving its headquarters from Sioux City, Iowa, to Kansas City when it began service to Tulsa and other cities in the oil field.

In 1954, TWA signed an agreement to move its overhaul base to the airport; the city was to build and own the $18 million-base and lease it to TWA. However, the downtown airport continued to be Kansas City's passenger airport; a 1963 Federal Aviation Agency memo called the downtown airport "one of the poorest major airports in the country for large jet aircraft" and recommended against spending any more federal money on it.

Along with the cramped site, there were doubts that the downtown site could handle the new Boeing 747. Jets had to make steep climbs and descents to avoid the downtown skyscrapers on the 200-ft (60-m) Missouri River bluffs at Quality Hill, east of the approach course a mile or two south of the south end of the runway, and downtown Kansas City was in the flight path for takeoffs and landings, resulting in the constant roar of aircraft engines being heard downtown. In contrast, Mid-Continent was surrounded by open farmland.

On July 1, 1965, Continental Airlines Flight 12 overran the runway while landing at Kansas City Municipal Airport. The Civil Aeronautics Board determined that the pilots of the Boeing 707 had landed properly within the touchdown zone for their ILS approach, and despite using the aircraft’s spoilers, thrust reversers, and wheel brakes, the remaining runway distance was too short for them to safely stop in heavy rain and tailwind conditions. Though having attempted to improve the runway surface and braking performance, the Airline Pilots Association said that many commercial pilots continued to "blacklist" the airport. A new airport, with longer runways, would be required to satisfy regulatory runway safety area requirements.

=== TWA's "Airport of the Future" ===
In 1966, voters in a 24:1 margin approved a $150 million bond issue following a campaign by Mayor Ilus W. Davis to move the city's main airport to an expanded Mid-Continent. The city had considered building its new airport 5 miles (8.0 km) north of downtown Kansas City in the Missouri River bottoms, as well as locations in southern Jackson County, Missouri, but decided to stick with the property it already owned.

The airport property was in an unincorporated area of Platte County until the small town of Platte City, Missouri, annexed the airport during construction. Kansas City eventually annexed the airport. Kivett and Myers designed the terminals and control tower; it was dedicated on October 23, 1972, by U.S. Vice President Spiro Agnew. After a few finishing touches, MCI officially opened for business on November 11, 1972, at 1:22 am. Labor strife and interruptions raised its cost to $250 million. Kansas City renamed the airport Kansas City International Airport (although it kept MCI as its airport code). TWA, Braniff, and everyone moved to MCI.

Many design decisions were driven by TWA, which envisioned the facility as its hub, with 747s and Supersonic Transports whisking people from America's heartland to all points on the globe. Streets around the airport included Mexico City Avenue, Brasília Avenue, Paris Street, London Avenue, and Tel Aviv Avenue. TWA vetoed concepts to model the airport on Washington–Dulles and Tampa, because those two airports had people movers, which it deemed too expensive. TWA insisted on "Drive to Your Gate" with flight gates 75 feet (23 m) from the roadway (signs along the roadway showed the flights leaving each gate). The single-level terminals had no stairs, similar to a plan that would be built at Dallas/Fort Worth.

TWA's vision for the future of flight that had been pioneered by the TWA Flight Center at JFK Airport in New York City (which also featured cars close to the gates design) proved troublesome almost from the start. The terminals turned out to be unfriendly to the 747 since arriving flights discharged hundreds of passengers at a time into gate areas and surrounding halls. When security checkpoints were hardened after 9/11, they were difficult and expensive to implement since passenger seating areas had to be walled off from the main concourses. As a result, passenger services were nonexistent downstream of the security checkpoint in the gate area. No restrooms were available, and shops, restaurants, newsstands, ATMs or any other passenger services were not available without exiting the secure area and being re-screened upon re-entry.

=== Post-9/11 ===
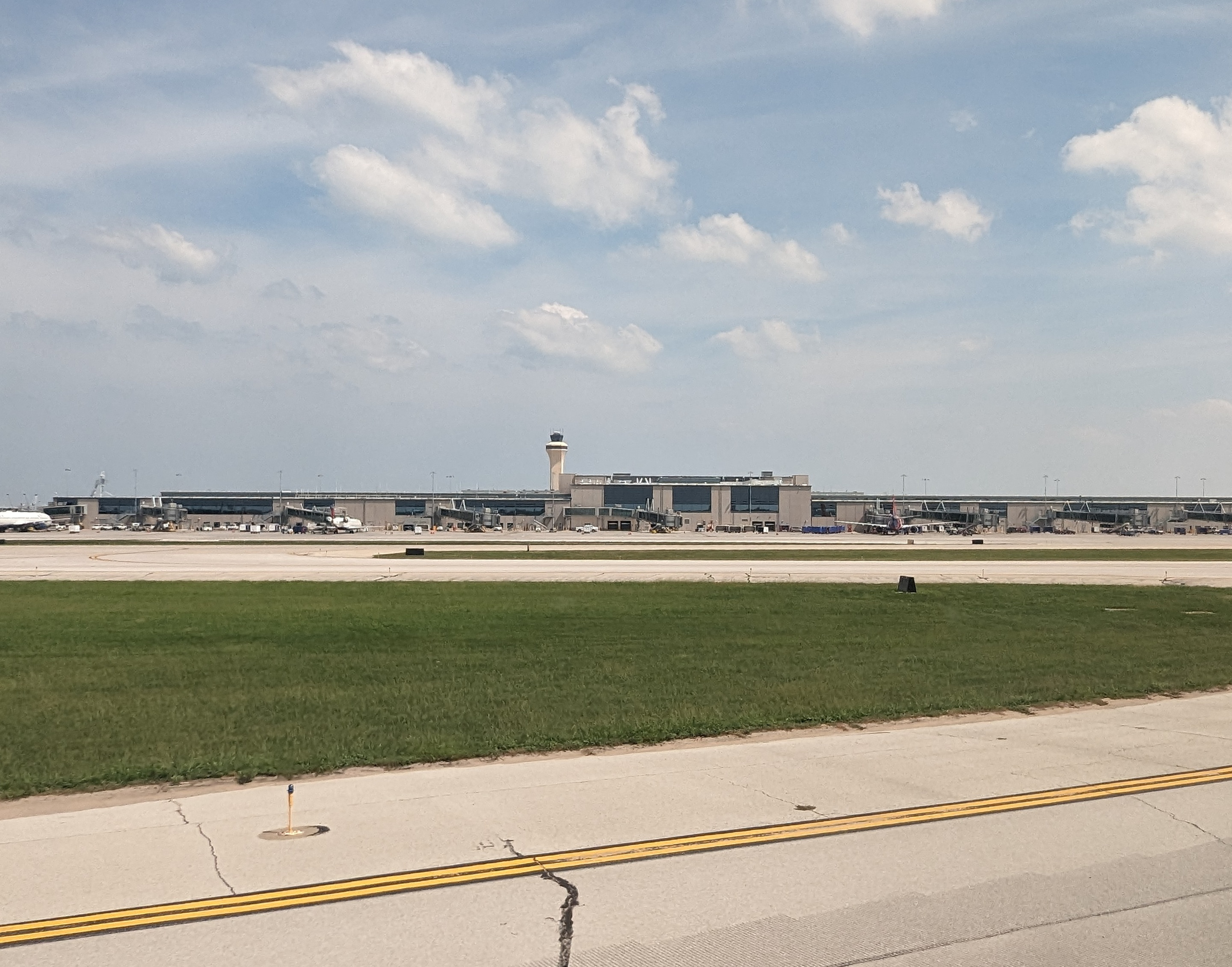
Kansas City International Airport in 2023

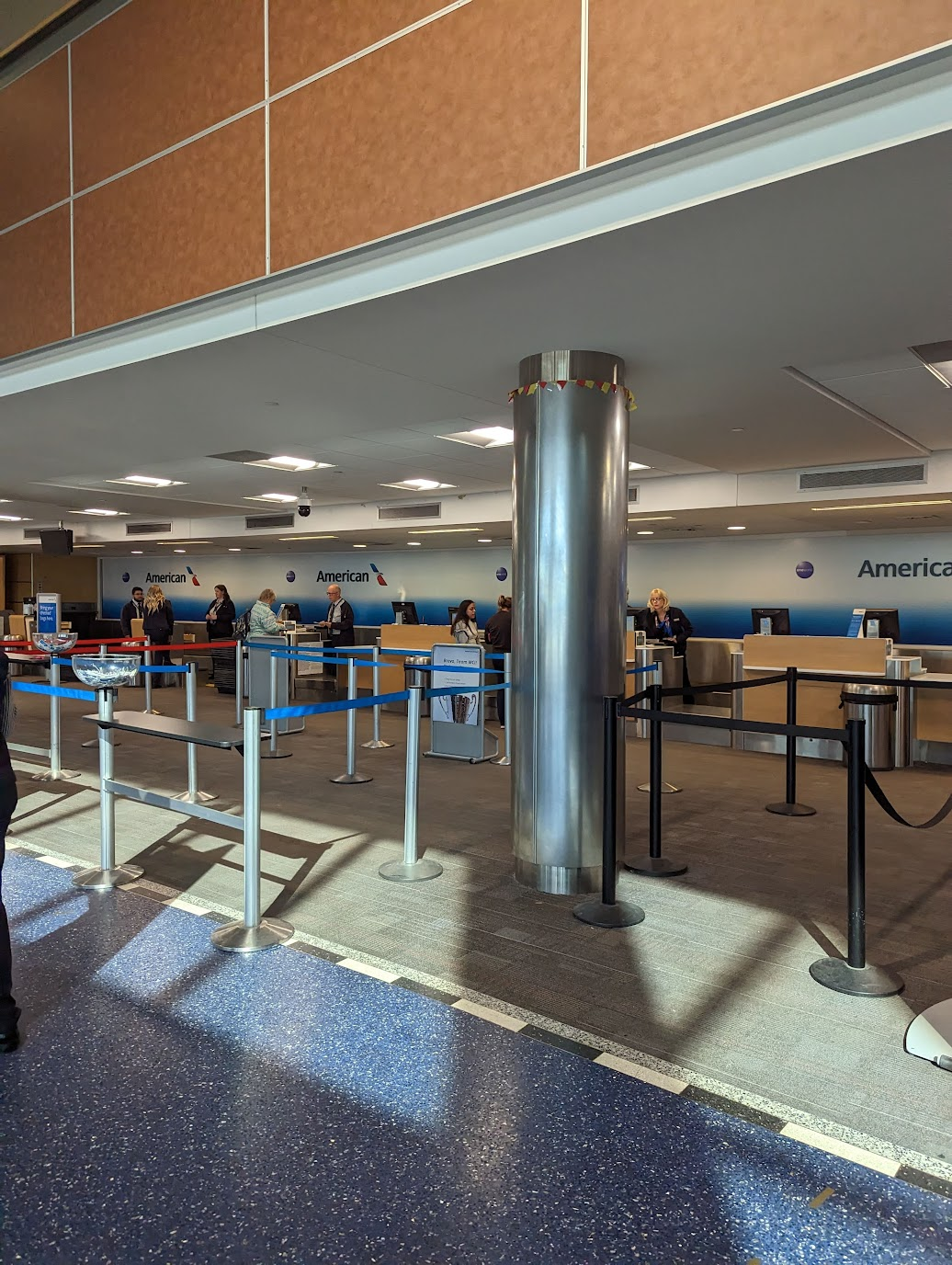
Terminal C check-in hall for American, taken on the day before closing.

After the establishment of the Transportation Security Administration (TSA) in 2001, MCI was one of five airports where the TSA has experimented with using independent contractors to inspect travelers. The airport used AKAL Security, an independent contractor that conforms to TSA's recruiting and training standards. TSA supervises these independent contractors, but they are not federal employees. AKAL was replaced by VMD Corporation in 2020.

A $258 million terminal renovation was completed in November 2004. Improvements included, amongst other things, increasing the size of each structural bay to provide larger spaces for vestibules, concessions, retail and public seating as well as new bathrooms inside security. Following the renovations, all three terminals included blue terrazzo floors. In May 2007, the final portion of the project, a new rental car facility and additional art fixtures, were completed.

In March 2010, the Transportation Security Administration announced that the airport would be one of the first in the United States to have full-body scanners, with the first one used at the Southwest Airlines screening area beginning in the summer of 2010.

Terminal A was closed on January 8, 2014, and demolished in 2019. Forty mosaic medallions from the terminal were preserved.

Icelandair launched a seasonal route to Reykjavík, Kansas City's first transatlantic flight, in May 2018. The airline operated the service with Boeing 757s. In the wake of the Boeing 737 MAX groundings, Icelandair decided to make changes to its network to increase profitability; these included severing the link to Kansas City. The last flight departed in September 2019.

In March 2019, the old Terminal A was demolished to make way for a new single terminal. Designed by SOM Architects, the $1.5 billion project was the largest single infrastructure project in Kansas City’s history.

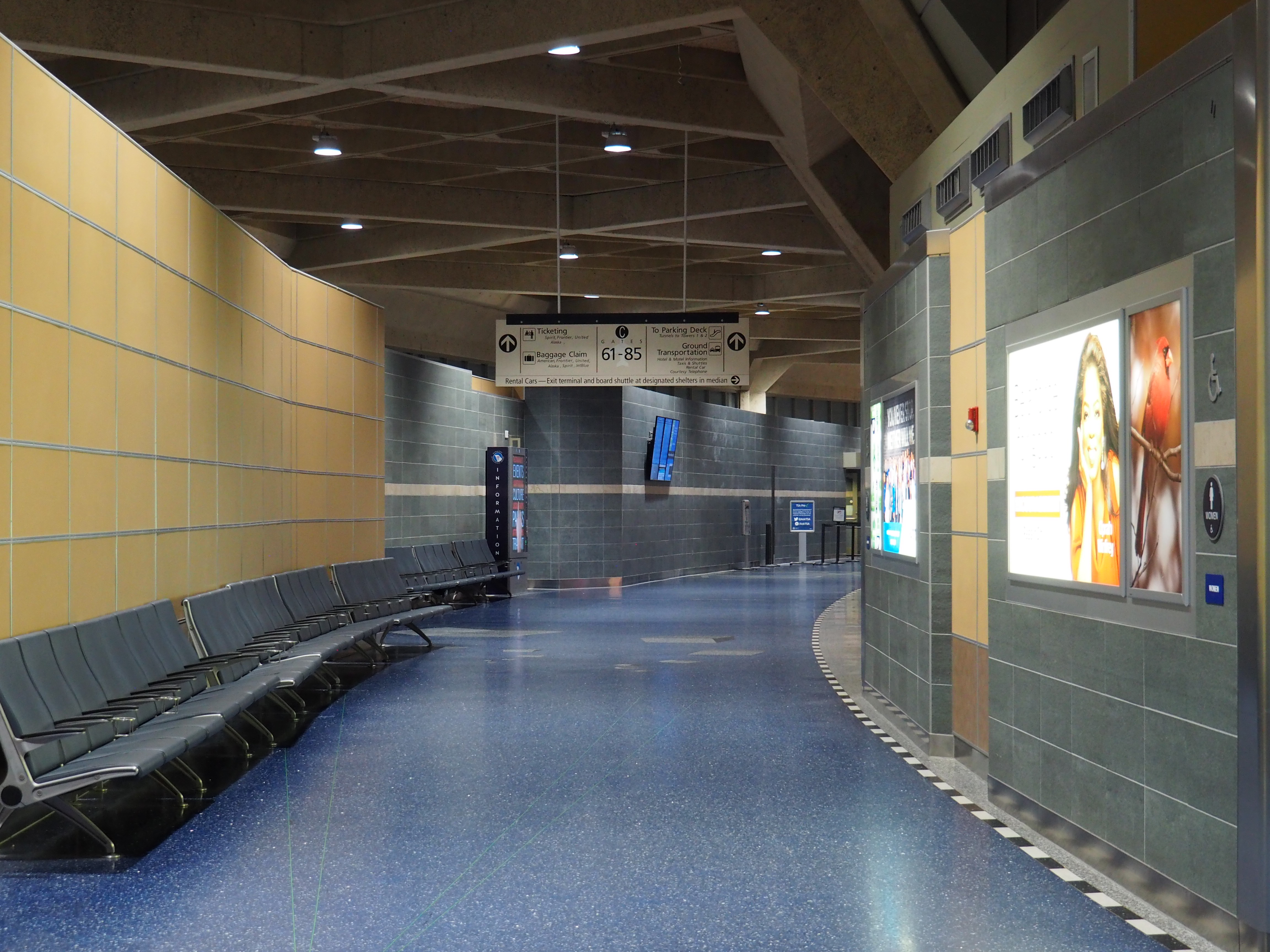
Terminal C interior shortly before closure, January 2023

In early 2020, Kansas City International Airport suspended all international flights due to the COVID-19 pandemic. The airport lifted all COVID-19 travel restrictions in March 2022.

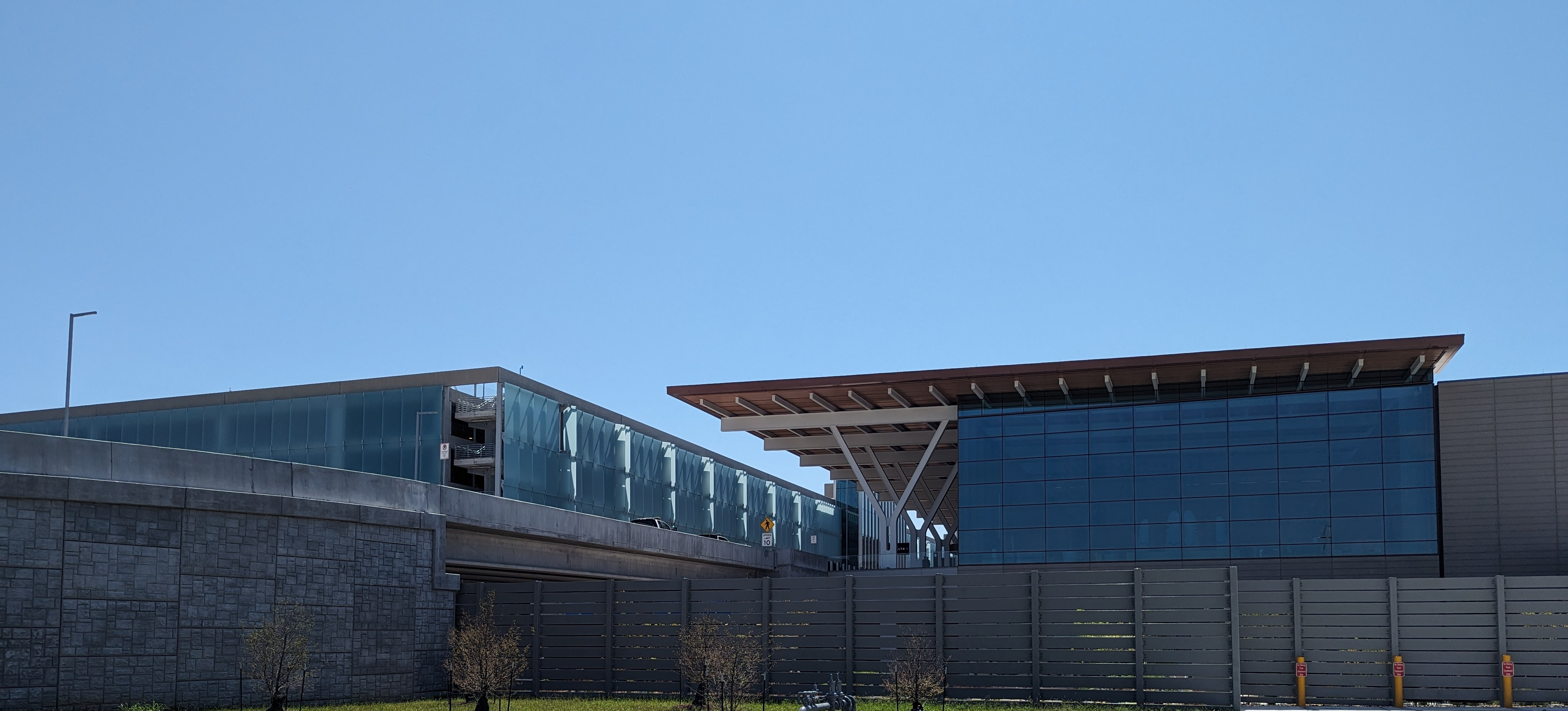
The parking garage and new terminal

The airport's new terminal opened on February 28, 2023. It features spacious gate areas and nearly 50 local and national food and beverage options. The terminal opened with 40 gates and the ability to expand up to 50 gates in the future. Two moving walkways expedite transfers between the two concourses to make navigating the airport easier. Consolidated and flexible security checkpoints were designed to accommodate changes in passenger volume. A new 6,200-space garage was built adjacent to the terminal to allow convenient covered parking near the terminal. The new facility also utilizes Amazon One, a technology that allows people to pay using their palm.

Also occurring on February 28, 2023, was the permanent closure of terminals B and C, what with the opening of the new single terminal. Fifty mosaic medallions from the two former terminals were preserved. In February 2024, the Kansas City Council approved a $17.5 million contract with St. Louis-based Spirtas Wrecking Company to demolish old terminals B and C. Demolition work began July 15, 2024, and was expected to last 10 weeks. MCI said the entire project is expected to take 10 months.

The amount of international flights has increased, with Southwest Airlines having commenced nonstop seasonal services to San José del Cabo and Montego Bay.

Air Canada announced in late 2024 that they would be terminating the route between Kansas City and Toronto for 2025 summer season due to low demand and issues with their Airbus A220 fleet. Air Canada has plans to revisit the route in 2026.

In 2024, MCI set an all-time record with 12,121,778 passengers served, breaking the record set in 2000 with 11.9 million passengers travelling through the airport.

=== Airport code ===
The city government has requested – but the airport has been unable – to change its original FAA location identifier of MCI for Mid-Continent, which had already been registered on navigational charts. Further complicating requests to change the designation, the Federal Communications Commission (FCC) at the time reserved all call letters with "K" or "W" for radio and television stations, so KCI was not viable. The "W" and "K" restrictions have since been lifted, but the FAA is reluctant to change names that have appeared on navigational charts. The "KCI" IATA designation is also already assigned to another airport, Kon Airport in East Timor. Nearby New Century AirCenter also carries the IATA code JCI (although the FAA refers to it as IXD and the ICAO as KIXD), which could also lead to confusion.

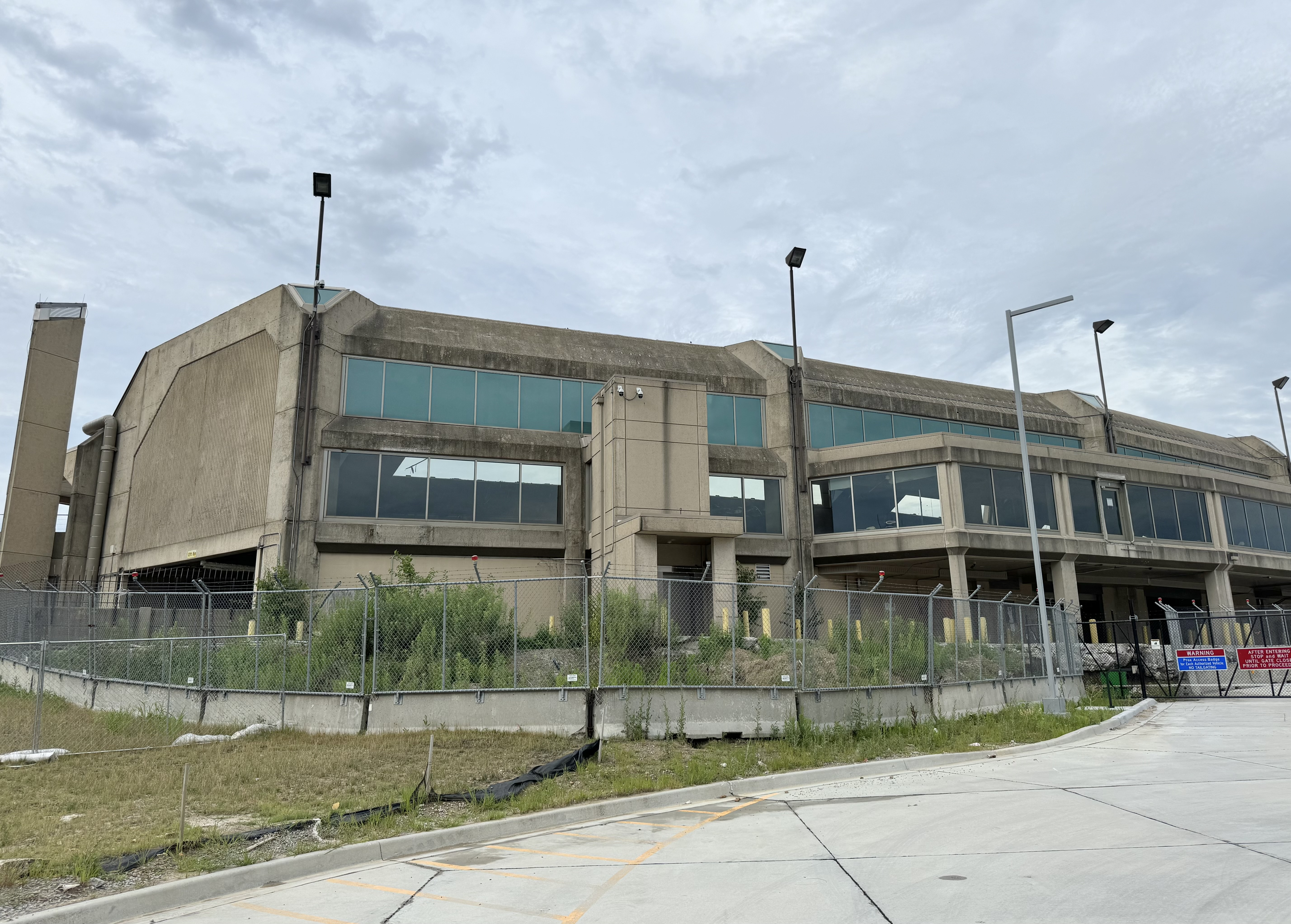
Old Terminal B one month before demolition

== Facilities ==
=== Terminal ===
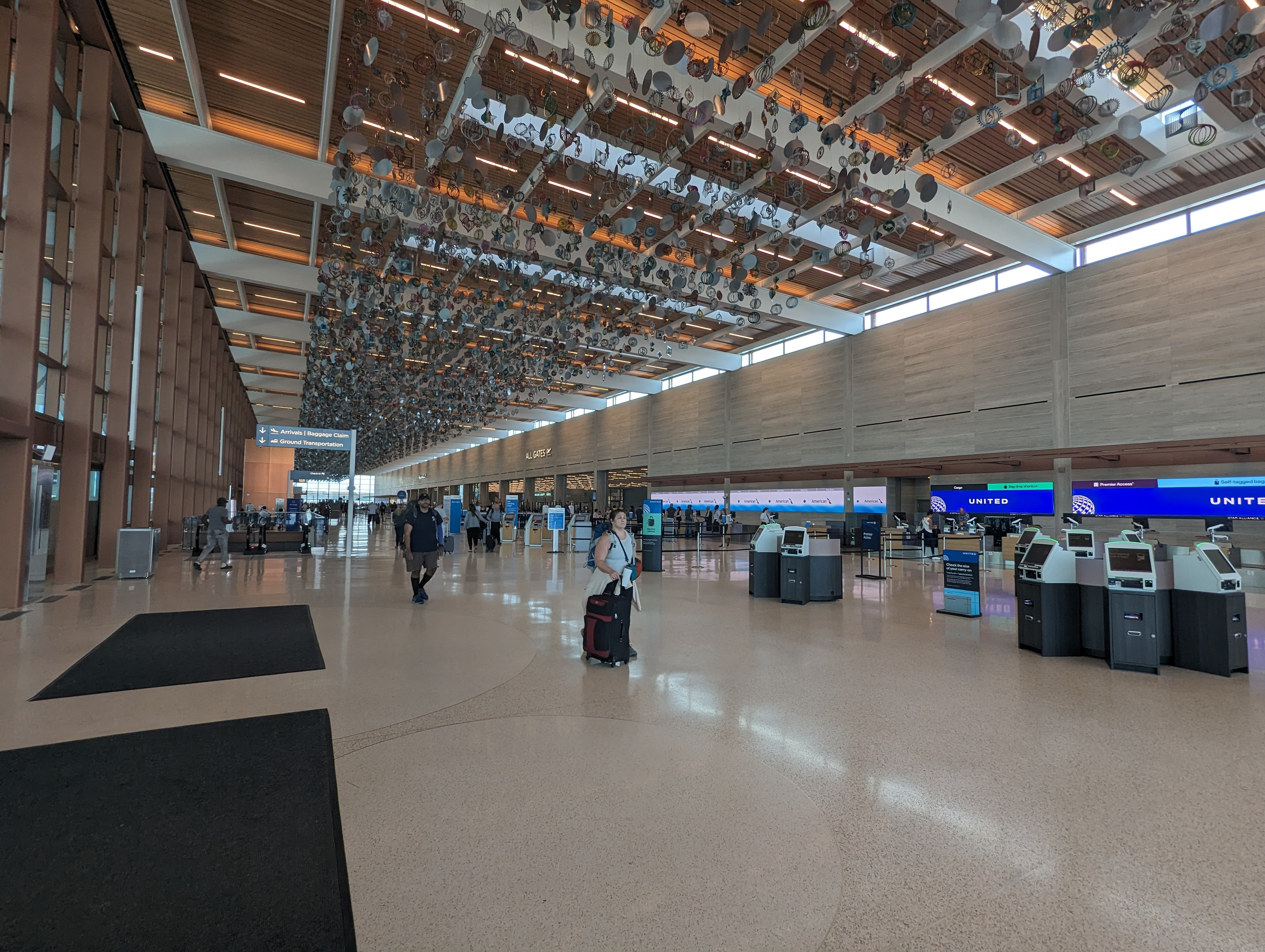
Departure hall of the new terminal

The airport has a single terminal with 40 gates and two concourses: Concourse A has 13 gates (A1–A20) and Concourse B has 27 gates (B40–B69). Non precleared international arrivals are processed at gates A12, A14, and A16. The terminal has works of public art from 28 commissioned artists funded through a percent for art program. The terminal is connected to an adjacent seven-story parking garage with 6,219 spaces; it includes parking stalls with electric vehicle chargers. Off-site parking is offered with a shuttle bus.

=== Ground transportation ===
The Kansas City Area Transportation Authority has public bus service to the airport from Downtown Kansas City that runs every hour. Plans for a fixed rail connection to the airport date back to the 1960s; in preparation for the 2026 FIFA World Cup, the city government commissioned plans for improved transit service to the airport. Several private scheduled shared shuttle services operate from MCI to regional cities (including Saint Joseph, Missouri; Columbia, Missouri; Topeka, Kansas; Lawrence, Kansas); and military bases (Fort Leonard Wood, Missouri; Fort Riley, Kansas; Fort Leavenworth, Kansas; and Whiteman Air Force Base, Missouri).

== Airlines and destinations ==
=== Passenger ===
Airlines	Destinations
Alaska Airlines	Seattle/Tacoma; Seasonal: Portland (OR)
Allegiant Air	Fort Lauderdale, Gulf Shores, Punta Gorda (FL), St. Petersburg/Clearwater; Seasonal: Destin/Fort Walton Beach
American Airlines	Charlotte, Chicago–O'Hare, Dallas/Fort Worth, Miami, Philadelphia, Phoenix–Sky Harbor; Seasonal: Cancún, Washington–National
American Eagle	Chicago–O'Hare, Dallas/Fort Worth, Philadelphia, Phoenix–Sky Harbor, Washington–National; Seasonal: Charlotte, Miami
Delta Air Lines	Atlanta, Boston, Detroit, Los Angeles, Minneapolis/St. Paul, New York–LaGuardia, Salt Lake City, Seattle/Tacoma; Seasonal: Cancún
Delta Connection	Austin, Boston, Minneapolis/St. Paul, New York–JFK, Raleigh/Durham; Seasonal: Orlando
Frontier Airlines	Denver, Las Vegas, Orlando ,
Southwest Airlines	Atlanta, Austin, Baltimore, Boston, Cancún, Chicago–Midway, Dallas–Love, Denver, Fort Lauderdale, Fort Myers, Houston–Hobby, Indianapolis, Las Vegas, Los Angeles, Milwaukee, Nashville, New Orleans, New York–LaGuardia, Orlando, Phoenix–Sky Harbor, Punta Cana, Raleigh/Durham, San Antonio, San Diego, San Francisco, San Juan (begins June 5, 2027), St. Louis, Tampa, Washington–National; Seasonal: Albuquerque, Charleston (SC), Columbus–Glenn, Destin/Fort Walton Beach, Miami, Montego Bay, Myrtle Beach, Norfolk, Panama City (FL), Pensacola, Portland (OR), Sacramento, San José Del Cabo, Sarasota, Savannah, Seattle/Tacoma
United Airlines	Chicago–O'Hare, Denver, Houston–Intercontinental, San Francisco; Seasonal: Newark
United Express	Chicago–O'Hare, Houston–Intercontinental, Los Angeles, Washington–Dulles; Seasonal: Denver, Newark

== Statistics ==
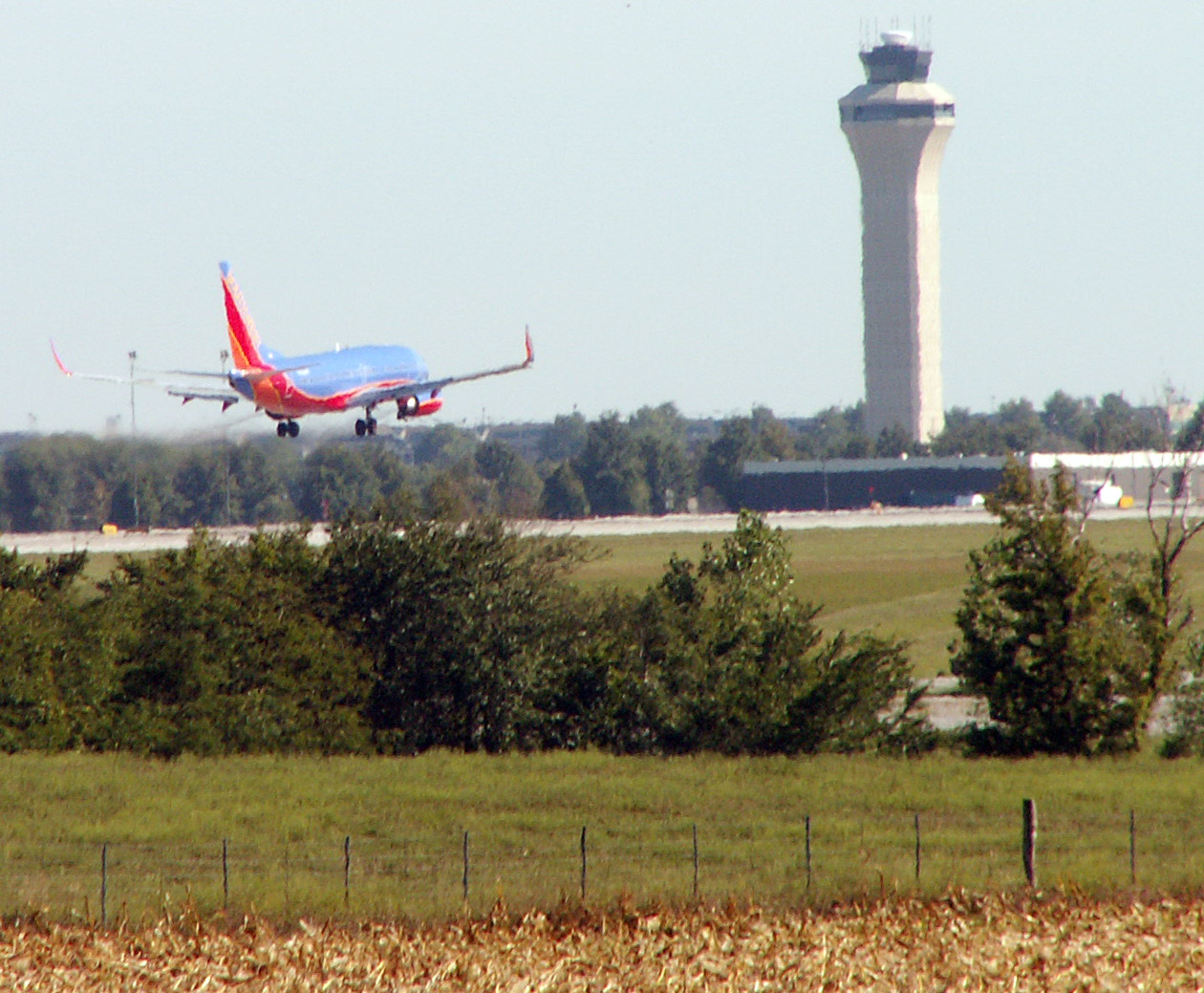
A Southwest Airlines Boeing 737-700 prepares to land.

=== Top destinations ===
Busiest domestic routes from MCI (June 2025 – May 2026)
Rank	Airport	Passengers	Carriers
1	Denver, Colorado	541,430	Frontier, Southwest, United
2	Atlanta, Georgia	446,196	Delta, Frontier, Southwest
3	Chicago–O'Hare, Illinois	353,551	American, United
4	Phoenix–Sky Harbor, Arizona	307,364	American, Frontier, Southwest
5	Dallas/Fort Worth, Texas	296,551	American
6	Las Vegas, Nevada	257,589	Southwest, Spirit
7	Chicago–Midway, Illinois	240,173	Southwest
8	Dallas–Love, Texas	212,521	Southwest
9	Orlando, Florida	210,410	Southwest, Spirit
10	Nashville, Tennessee	177,114	Southwest

Busiest international routes from MCI (June 2025 – May 2026)
Rank	Airport	Passengers	Carriers
1	Cancún, Mexico	110,287	American, Delta, Southwest
2	San José del Cabo, Mexico	17,300	Southwest
3	Punta Cana, Dominican Republic	1,622	Southwest
4	Montego Bay, Jamaica	1,136	Southwest

=== Airline market share ===
Largest airlines at MCI (June 2025 – May 2026)
Rank	Airline	Passengers	Share
1	Southwest Airlines	5,592,039	49.0%
2	Delta Air Lines	1,978,412	17.3%
3	American Airlines	1,756,594	15.4%
4	United Airlines	1,286,040	11.3%
5	Alaska Airlines	302,550	2.7%
	Other	500,213	4.4%

=== Annual traffic ===
Passenger volume at MCI, 1972–present
Year	Passengers	Year	Passengers	Year	Passengers	Year	Passengers
1972	3,968,244 (a)	1987	9,433,030	2002	9,910,994	2017	11,503,609
1973	3,884,754	1988	9,481,389	2003	9,343,046	2018	11,850,825
1974	4,227,416	1989	9,351,284	2004	9,749,171	2019	11,795,635
1975	4,229,849	1990	6,943,836	2005	9,735,617	2020	4,493,669
1976	4,495,796	1991	6,946,615	2006	10,569,590	2021	7,677,004
1977	4,723,604	1992	7,414,584	2007	11,276,383	2022	9,819,092
1978	5,335,928	1993	7,932,018	2008	10,469,524	2023	11,545,742
1979	5,927,593	1994	8,923,516	2009	9,774,945	2024	12,121,778
1980	5,277,391	1995	9,500,980	2010	10,156,260	2025	11,459,954
1981	4,626,008	1996	10,017,451	2011	10,400,854	2026	
1982	5,082,081	1997	11,060,227	2012	9,992,746	2027	
1983	5,010,752	1998	10,954,527	2013	9,872,314	2028	
1984	6,458,155	1999	11,490,551	2014	10,166,879	2029	
1985	7,238,789	2000	11,910,654	2015	10,471,141	2030	
1986	8,299,388	2001	11,601,958	2016	11,041,750	2031	

(a) Includes passenger totals for Charles B. Wheeler Downtown Airport January–November 1972.

From 1972 through 2025, MCI has served 466,947,610 passengers (enplaned+deplaned), annual average of 8,647,178 passengers per year.

== Accidents and incidents ==
- April 13, 1987 – Buffalo Airways (of Waco, TX) Flight 721 operated by Burlington Air Express cargo flight from Wichita Mid-Continent Airport descending in a thick fog with half-mile visibility clipped a 950-ft-high ridge 3 miles (4.8 km) short of the runway. All four occupants were killed, the deadliest accident in the airport's history.
- February 16, 1995 – Air Transport International Flight 782, McDonnell Douglas DC-8 flight to Westover Metropolitan Airport, which had aborted a take off six minutes before because of loss of directional control, crashed on Runway 1L on another take-off because of failure of the directional control when its tail hit the runway. All three on board were killed.
- August 25, 2001 – At 01:11 am, an America West Airlines Boeing 737-300 operating as Flight 598 from Phoenix Sky Harbor Airport touched down on Runway 27 to the left of the center line during severe weather. The first officer in command failed to correct for leftward drift and the aircraft exited the runway approximately 1,000 feet after touchdown. Both engines were destroyed by foreign object debris, but the aircraft was repaired and returned to service. No fatalities and only one injury were reported by the 53 passengers and 6 crew.

=== Wildlife strikes ===
In 2009, the airport was reported as having the highest number of wildlife strikes of any airport in the US, based on take-offs and landings (57 per 100,000). FAA records showed 146 strikes in 2008, up from 37 in 2000.

The Kansas City Aviation Department issued a press release on October 15, 2009, outlining its Wildlife Hazard Management Plan created in 1998 to reduce wildlife strikes, including removal of 60 acres (24 ha) of trees, zero tolerance for Canada geese, ensuring grain crops are not grown within 2,000 feet (610 m) of the runways, and harassing wildlife to keep it clear of the airport. Furthermore, in 2007, the airport elected to enact a policy of 100% submitting wildlife strike reports to the FAA/USDA National Strike Database. When birds are involved in a strike, whether reported by an aircraft owner or operator, or the bird was found on the runway, feathers or DNA samples are recovered and sent to the Smithsonian Institution for positive identification. This documentation is conducted regardless of whether the strike occurred on or off the airfield.

In the reporting period of January 1990 to September 2008, none of the encounters resulted in injury to people and all of the airplanes landed safely. The report listed the most serious incidents.

- February 25, 1999 – A Learjet 35 approaching Downtown Kansas City Airport struck a flock of snow geese over MCI. One hit the copilot's window, and one was ingested into an engine, shutting it down. It landed safely.
- March 4, 1999 – A DC-9 landing at the airport struck a flock of snow geese, ingesting geese in both engines and shutting one down. The airplane landed safely.
- April 28, 2000 – A Boeing 727 on take-off struck a Canada goose, destroying an engine. It returned safely.
- June 10, 2005 – A DC-9 on takeoff struck an American kestrel, stalling an engine. It returned safely.
- March 31, 2006 – A Boeing 737 struck a medium to large bird and damaged an engine on take-off. It returned safely.
- November 14, 2009 – Frontier Airlines Flight 820, an Airbus A319, to Denver, struck a flock of Canada geese shortly after take-off, resulting in loss of power to an engine. The airplane made a safe return to MCI.

== See also ==
- List of airports in Missouri
- Charles B. Wheeler Downtown Airport
