= Kansas City Live Stock Exchange =

- U.S. National Register of Historic Places
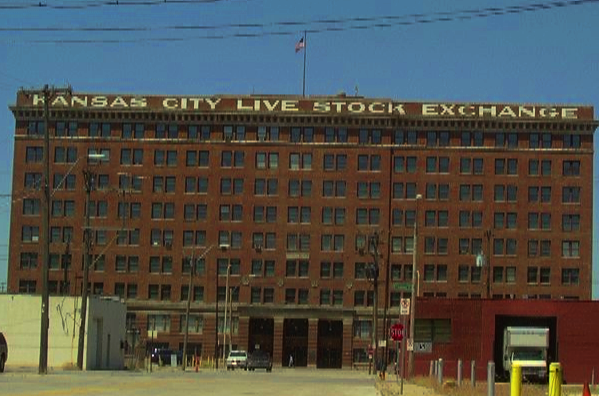

- Location within Missouri Location within the United States
- Location: 1600 Genessee St., Kansas City, Missouri
- Coordinates: 39°5′40″N 94°36′19″W
- Built: 1911; 115 years ago
- Architect: Wilder & Wight; Swenson Construction Co.
- Website: livestockexchangebldg.com
- NRHP reference No.: 84002571
- Added to NRHP: April 05, 1984

The Kansas City Live Stock Exchange building was the headquarters of the former historic Kansas City Stockyards. It is located at 1600 Gennesse in Kansas City, Missouri, in the West Bottoms. The building is on the National Register of Historic Places and is owned by Bill Haw.

== Architecture ==
Construction began in 1909 and was completed in 1911, as the largest livestock exchange building in the world. In 1957, a one-story addition was constructed on the south side for the Golden Ox restaurant which had opened in 1949.

The building has been renovated as offices with many business and personal services, including a coffee shop with breakfast and lunch, a barber salon, and a health club with masseuse. Its U.S. Post Office closed in December 2008.

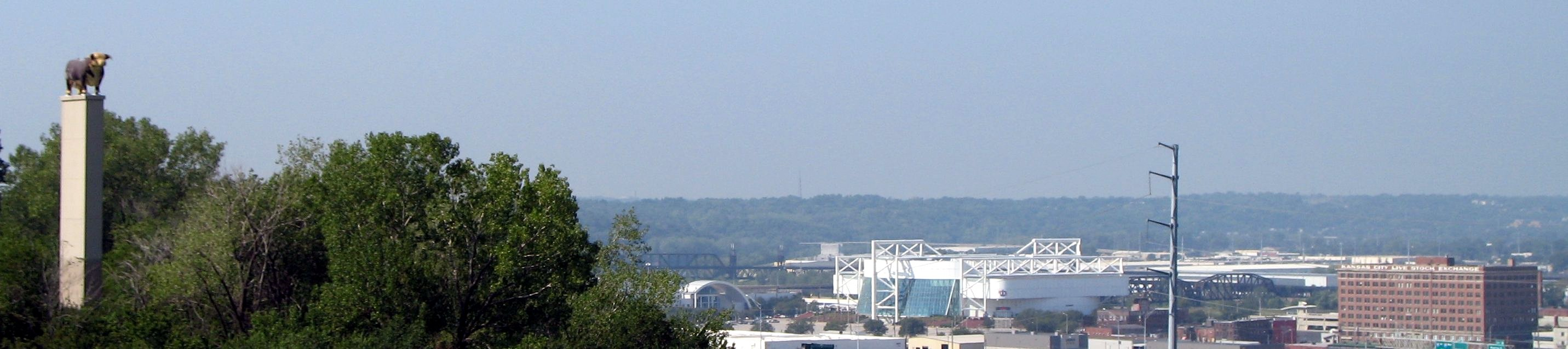
The American Hereford Association bull, Kemper Arena, and the Kansas City Live Stock Exchange Building are in the former stockyards of the West Bottoms. They are visible from Quality Hill, Kansas City.
