= Kansas City SmartPort =

Kansas City Smartport
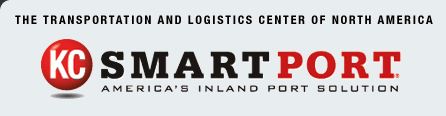
- Company type: Non profit
- Industry: Logistics
- Founded: 2001
- Headquarters: Kansas City, Missouri
- Website: https://onekc.org/kc-smartport/

Kansas City SmartPort is an economic development group for the existing logistics industry in Kansas City, Missouri and the attraction of logistics investments in the Kansas City metropolitan area. KC SmartPort is a non-profit, investor-based organization.

== History ==
KC SmartPort was born out of the Mid-Continent TradeWay Study, an analysis to "determine the feasibility and national benefits of establishing the Kansas City region as a place where international trade processing activities can be carried out". The study was jointly commissioned in 1998 by the Mid-America Regional Council, the Greater Kansas City Chamber of Commerce, and the Kansas City Area Development Council.

== International trade ==
The current proposal calls for officials from Mexico to inspect and tag cargo and before it is shipped via truck or train expedited through the international border to the Pacific deep water ports at Lázaro Cárdenas, Michoacán and Manzanillo, Colima, where the exports would be sent to Asia. It is claimed the port would be 15% cheaper than shipping exports to the California ports at San Diego and Los Angeles.

== Initiatives ==
- Supply Chain Education Group

A coordinated effort to raise the awareness and understanding of what supply chain management is and its function in modern business practices.

- Kansas City has proposed two ports:
  - The 14th & Liberty Street truck port near the city's first union train station in the city's West Bottoms (which is already in contract).
  - The Richards-Gebaur train port south of the city which would be served by the Kansas City Southern Railroad (which is considered a long-term project).
  - Proposed international collaboration in order to ship goods through Canada to Europe.

== Logistical advantages of Kansas City ==
- Highest volume of rail traffic in the United States in terms of tonnage
- Third largest trucking center in the United States
- Largest free trade zone in the (more than 10,000 acres (40 km^{2})
- Largest underground warehouse space in the world, including SubTropolis
- Largest air cargo facility
- Largest navigable inland waterway
- Located in the center of NAFTA Railway and four major interstate highways (I-35, I-70, I-29, I-49)

== Leadership and board of directors ==
- Mark Long, Chairman
- Chris J. F. Gutierrez, President
- Full Listing
