= Hampton, Missouri =

- Former Hamlet
- Location within the state of Missouri
- Coordinates: 39°16′53″N 94°43′59″W
- Country: United States
- State: Missouri
- County: Platte
- Time zone: UTC-6 (Central (CST))
  - Summer (DST): UTC-5 (CDT)

Hampton, Missouri was a small hamlet in rural Platte County, Missouri.

The area around Hampton was picked in 1953 to be home for the Kansas City Industrial Airport. In 1966, Kansas City, Missouri, annexed the hamlet as part of upgrading the airport to Kansas City International Airport.

The hamlet was one of the first settlements following the Platte Purchase in 1836. Hampton has the name of Hampton Kimsey, who owned the land where the community now stands. A post office called Hampton was established in 1853, and remained in operation until 1904.

The hamlet was just south of the airport. It is connected to Farley, Missouri to the west by NW Farley Hampton Road. The NW Hampton Road goes south from the community. On the official Kansas City list of its neighborhoods it is part of KCI-2nd Creek, Kansas City.
