= American Royal =

Annual animal show

American Royal logo

The American Royal is a not-for-profit organization with the purpose to champion food and agriculture. The organization coordinates events and programs, including a livestock show, horse show, rodeo, and barbecue competition held each year in September – November at various sites in the Kansas City metropolitan area. The Future Farmers of America (now the National FFA Organization) was founded during the annual Royal. The Kansas City Royals professional baseball team derived its name from the Royal.

== History ==
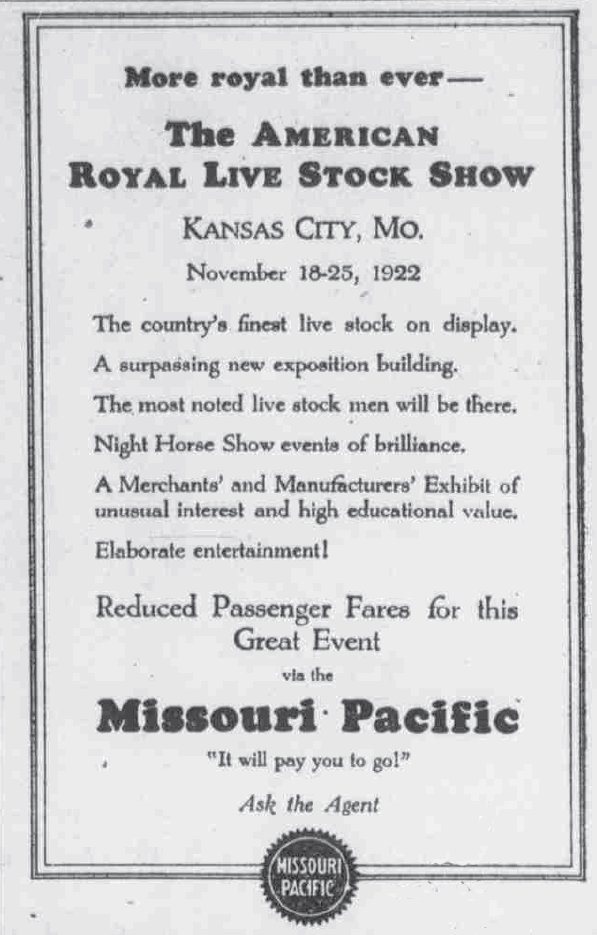
Newspaper ad for the 1922 version of the Royal

The American Royal began as a cattle show in 1899 in the Kansas City Stockyards. The name "American Royal" was inspired by a 1901 editorial in beef industry publication Kansas City Drovers Telegram titled "Call it the American Royal". The editorial said the Royal Agricultural Society of England has a similar event called the Royal Show. The first American Royal horse show was added in 1907, and has grown to include five shows (Quarter Horse Show, Hunter-Jumper Horse Show, Arabian Horse Show, American Saddlebred, Youth Horse Show, and a Cutting Horse show).

In 1926, the American Royal invited vocational agriculture students to judge livestock. During the 1928 American Royal, 33 of the students meeting at the Baltimore Hotel in downtown Kansas City formed the Future Farmers of America. Now, the National FFA Organization has 579,678 members. The group proceeded to hold a convention every year during the Royal in Kansas City until 1998. The original home of the American Royal was destroyed by fire in 1925 during an Automobile Show. The structure was rebuilt in time for the event that year and served as the center for events until the American Royal complex was built across from Kemper Arena in 1992. During World War II, the Royal complex was converted into a glider factory.

No event was held in 1917–18 nor 1942–45.

In 2011, American Royal officially "obtained the legal rights to the Barbecue Hall of Fame in 2011".

In 2020, some events were moved online because of the COVID-19 pandemic.

=== New complex 1992 ===
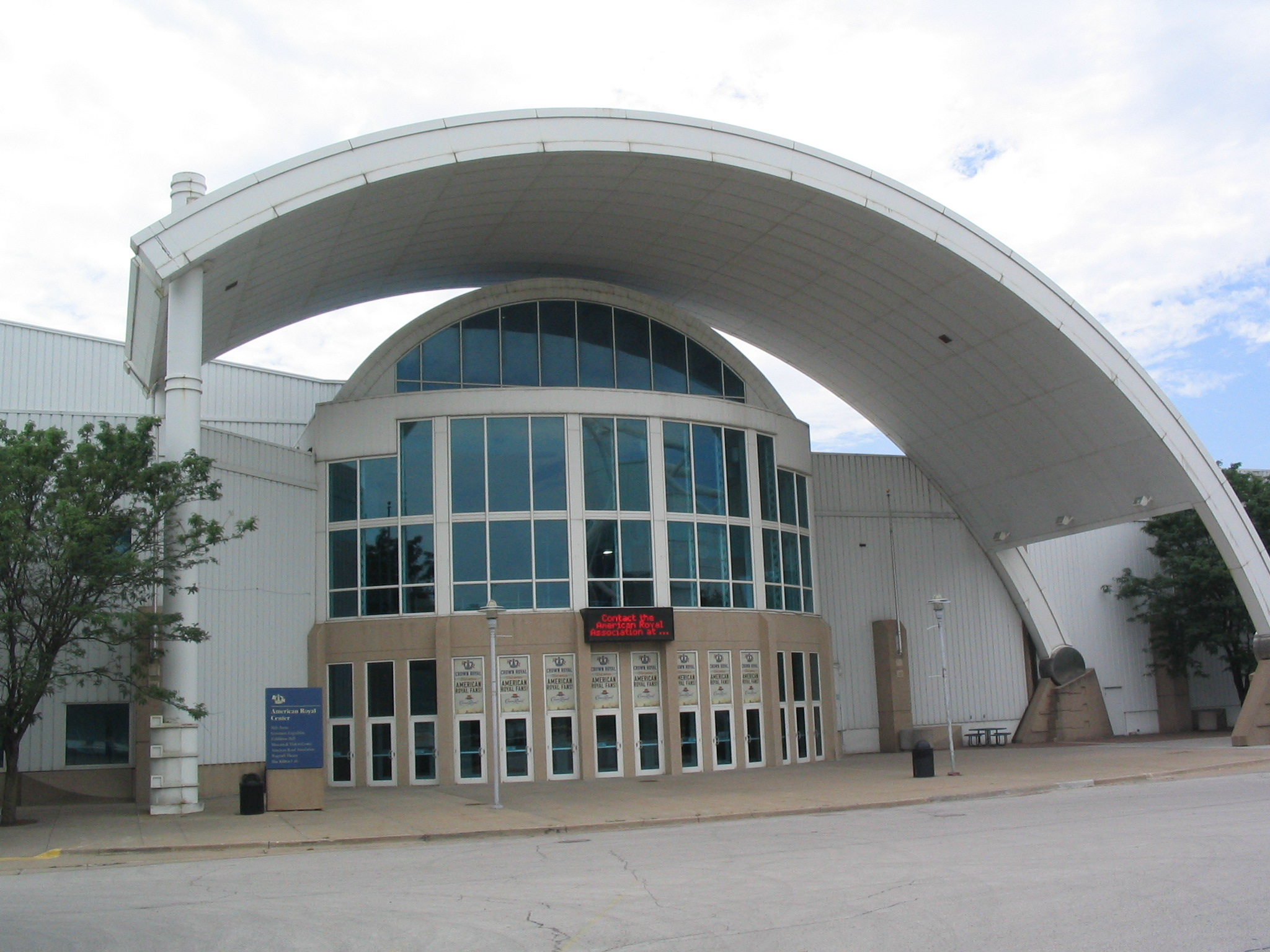
American Royal Complex

The new American Royal Complex was constructed in 1992 to replace the outdated facility constructed in 1926. The complex was designed by the engineering design firm Black and Veatch and constructed by Walton Construction. The new complex consists of a museum and visitor center, three exhibition halls, Hale Arena, a theater, a full-service restaurant and concession stand, and the administrative offices. In 1993, the new facilities were flooded but were restored in time for the American Royal livestock shows to continue late that year. Hale Arena has since been replaced by Hy-Vee Arena and the Sprint Center as arenas where the livestock and rodeo shows are held each year. The barbecue competition had been held on the complex grounds, but was moved to the Arrowhead Stadium parking lots in 2015 and then to Kansas Speedway in 2016.

=== American Royal Museum ===
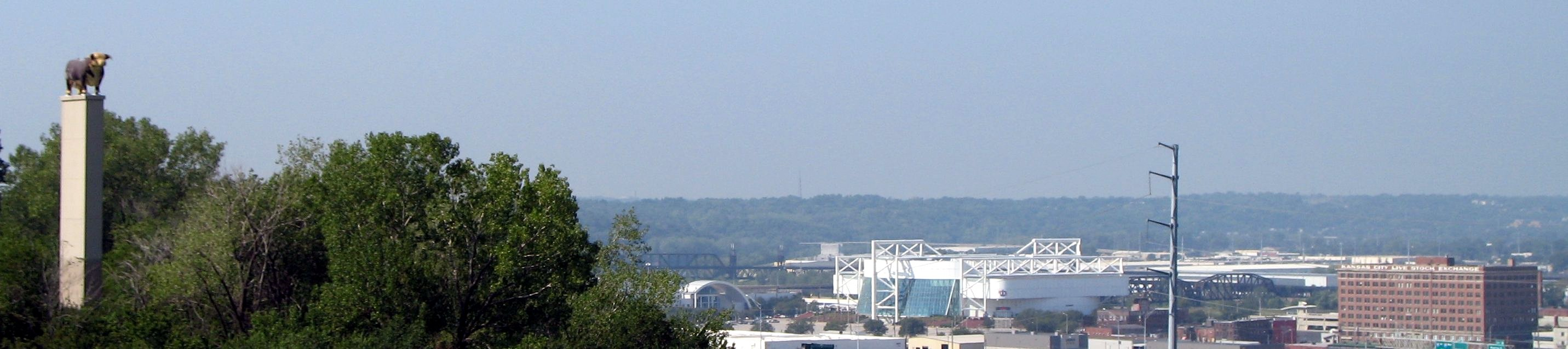
The American Hereford Association bull and Hy-Vee Arena and the Kansas City Livestock Exchange Building in the former Kansas City Stockyards of the West Bottoms, as seen from Quality Hill

The American Royal Museum is open by appointment and for extended hours during the American Royal season. Exhibits include horses, veterinary medicine, the history of the American Royal, agriculture in Kansas City, and horse, rodeo and livestock show clothing, saddles, and memorabilia.

=== Move to Wyandotte County ===
In October 2016, the American Royal Association announced its relocation to Wyandotte County, Kansas. It had secured the land by December 2019. Groundbreaking was expected to start in early 2020. The complex was expected to open in November 2021.

== Events ==
The American Royal is an annual eight-week season of barbecue competition, rodeos, livestock shows, equestrian events and agricultural activities benefiting youth and education. One of Kansas City's premier late-year events with annual economic impact of more than $62 million, the Royal hosts the world's largest barbecue contest, one of the Midwest's largest livestock exhibitions, a rodeo sanctioned by the Professional Rodeo Cowboys Association (PRCA), and is home of the national championship horse competition. In 2009 and 2010, the World Finals event for the Championship Bull Riding (CBR) circuit was held in conjunction with the American Royal.

The barbecue contest is divided into several categories: brisket, pork ribs, pork shoulder, chicken, sausage, side dishes, and dessert.

== Organization ==
The American Royal is a not-for-profit, community volunteer-based service organization which raises funds for endowments contributions, sponsorships, and event revenues.

In 2005, the organization contributed more than $1.3 million in the form of scholarships, educational awards, educational programs, community donations, competitive awards, and prize monies and premiums.

== See also ==
- Rodeo bareback rigging
- American Royal Zephyr
