= Hy-Vee Arena =

Arena in Missouri, United States

Coordinates: 39°5′31″N 94°36′21″W

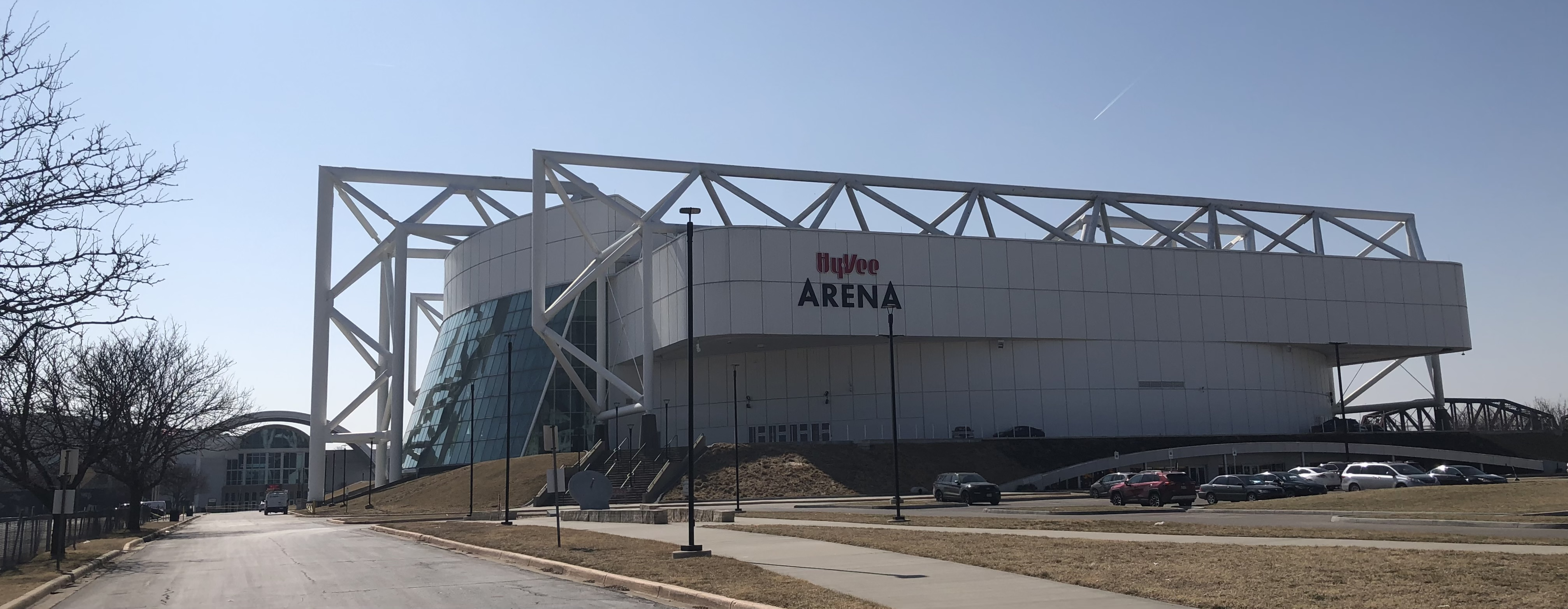
- Exterior view of venue, 2022
- Interactive map of Hy-Vee Arena
- Former names: Kemper Arena (1974–2018); Mosaic Arena (2017)
- Address: 1800 Genessee Street; Kansas City, Missouri; 64102
- Location: West Bottoms
- Owner: Foutch Brothers LLC
- Capacity: 17,513 (1988–1997); 19,500 (1997–2016); 8,500 (2018–present)

Construction
- Groundbreaking: July 17, 1972
- Opened: September 30, 1974
- Renovated: 1976, 1987, 1996, 2017–2018
- Cost: $23 million ($177 million in 2025 dollars)
- Architect: Helmut Jahn
- Services engineer: HNTB
- General contractor: J. E. Dunn Construction Group

Tenant
- Former tenants: see the History section

Website
- hyveearena.com
- Building details

General information
- Groundbreaking: September 17, 2017
- Opened: October 5, 2018
- Renovation cost: $39 million

Renovating team
- Architects: Foutch Architecture and Development
- Main contractor: McCownGordon Construction
- R. Crosby Kemper Sr. Memorial Arena
- U.S. National Register of Historic Places
- Architectural style: Modern
- NRHP reference No.: 14000160
- Added to NRHP: September 9, 2016

Hy-Vee Arena, previously known as Kemper Arena, is an indoor arena located in Kansas City, Missouri. Prior to conversion to a youth sports and community gymnasium facility, Kemper Arena was previously a 19,500-seat professional sports arena. It has hosted NCAA Final Four basketball games, professional basketball and hockey teams, professional wrestling events, the 1976 Republican National Convention, concerts, and is the ongoing host of the American Royal livestock show.

It was originally named for Rufus Crosby Kemper Sr., a member of the powerful Kemper financial clan and who donated $3.2 million from his estate for the arena. In 2016, it was listed on the National Register of Historic Places in recognition of its revolutionary design by Helmut Jahn.

== History ==
=== Construction ===
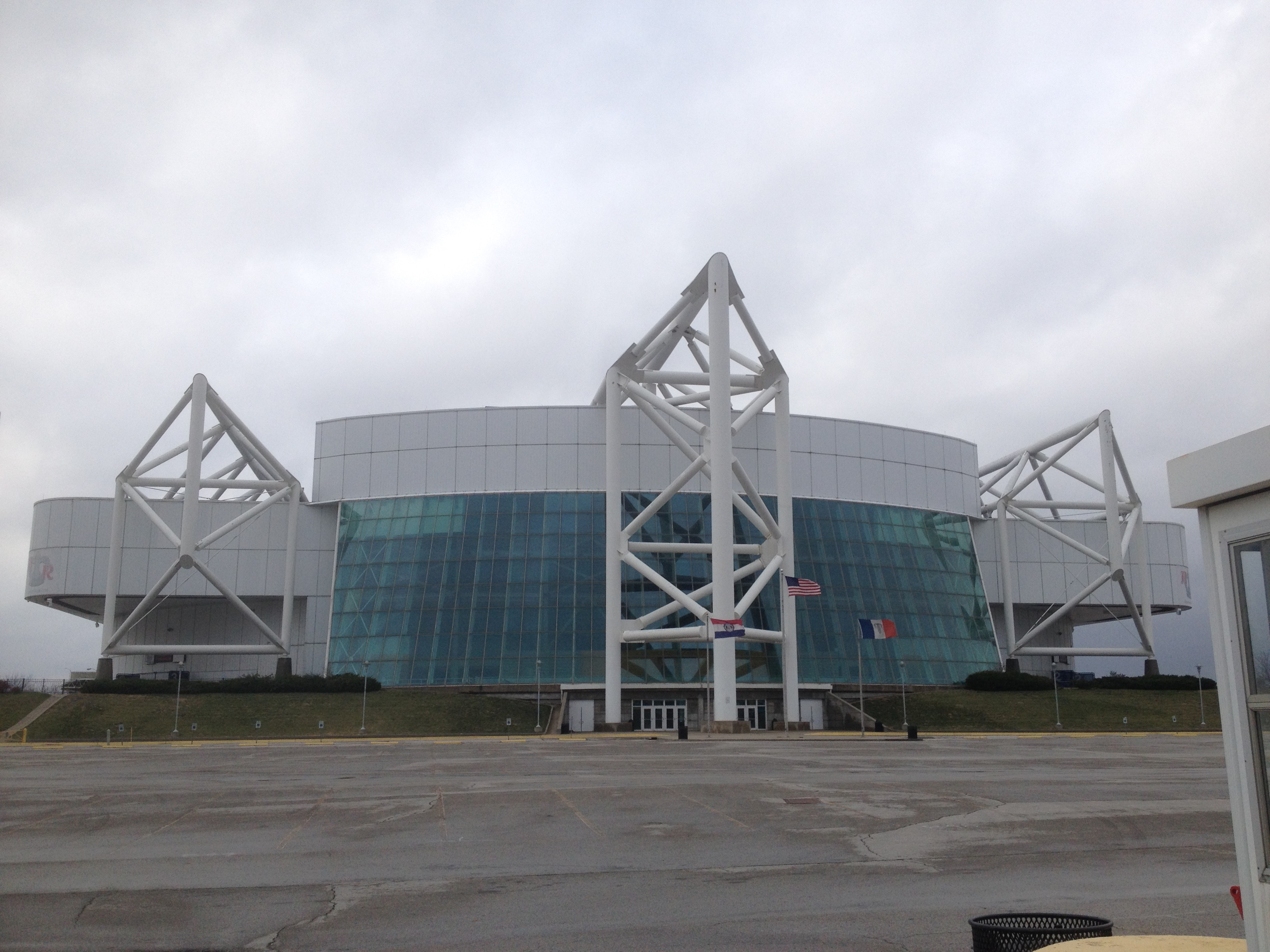
Kemper Arena, 2014, prior to its renovation. The exterior of the facility has remained unchanged, even after its renovation.

Kemper Arena was built in 18 months in 1973–74 on the site of the former Kansas City Stockyards just west of downtown in the West Bottoms to replace the 8,000-seat Municipal Auditorium to play host to the city's professional basketball and hockey teams.

The arena was the first major project of German architect Helmut Jahn, who was to go on to become an important architect of his era.

The building was revolutionary in its simplicity and the fact it did not have interior columns obstructing views. Its roof is suspended by exterior steel trusses. The nearly windowless structure contrasts to Jahn's later signature style of providing wide-open, glass-enclosed spaces. Kemper's exterior skeleton style was to be used extensively throughout Jahn's other projects.

The building cost $22 million and was previously owned by the city of Kansas City, Missouri. Financing came from seven sources:

- $5.6 million from general obligation bonds
- $3.2 million donated by Rufus Crosby Kemper Sr.
- $575,000 from bond interest
- $1.5 million donated by the American Royal Association
- Land provided by the Kansas City Stockyards Company
- $10 million from revenue bonds in conjunction with the Jackson County Sports Authority
- $2 million in federal grants for street work

=== 1970s ===
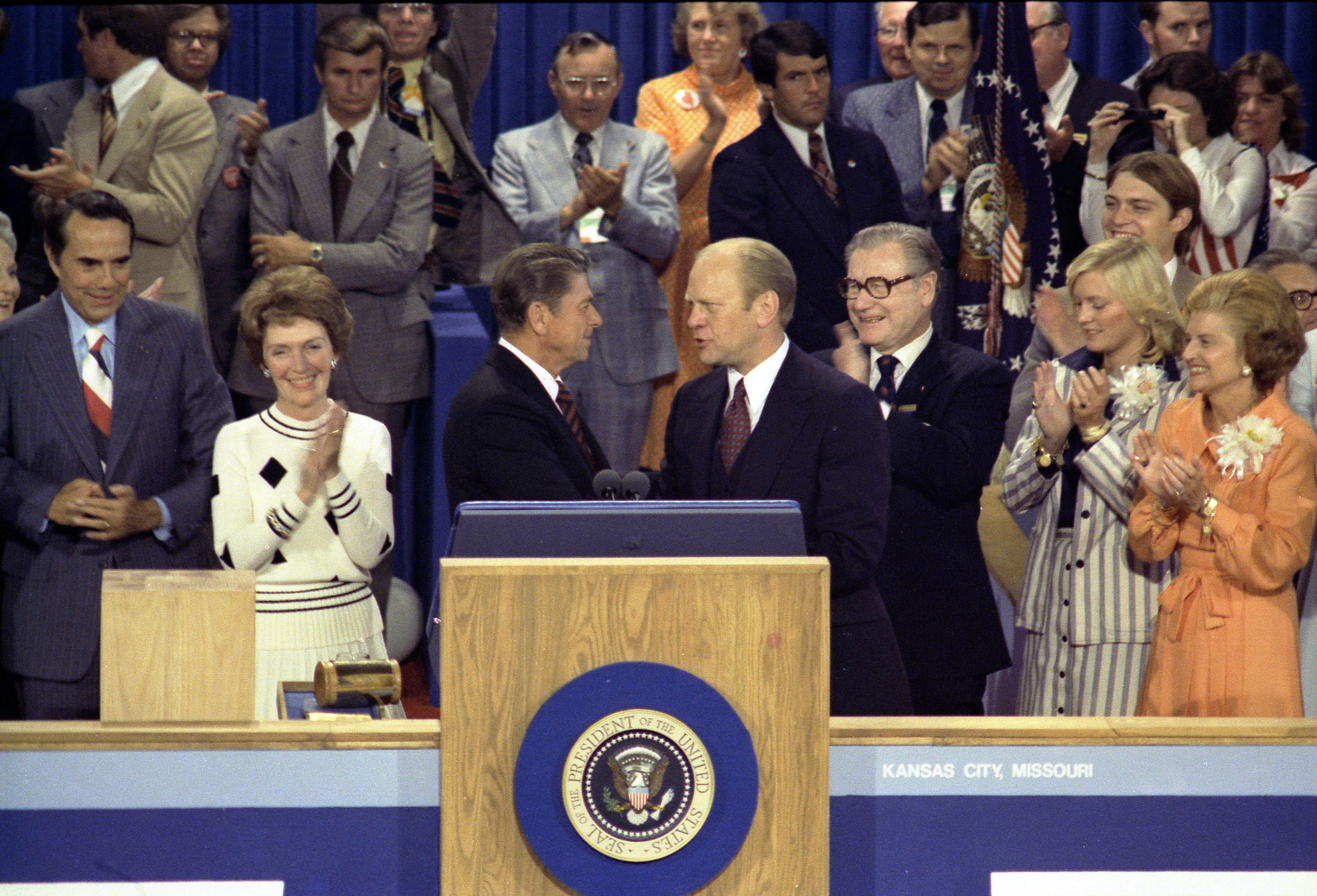
The 1976 Republican National Convention. Left to right, the vice-presidential candidate, Kansas Senator Bob Dole, Mrs. Nancy Reagan, Former California Governor Ronald Reagan, President Gerald R. Ford, and Vice-President Nelson A. Rockefeller. First Lady Betty Ford is on the far right next to daughter Susan Ford.

The arena won architectural awards in the 1970s and had these notable tenants:

- 1974–1976 – Kansas City Scouts of the NHL
- 1974–1985 – Kansas City Kings of the NBA
- 1976 Republican National Convention (where President Gerald R. Ford defeated former California Governor Ronald Reagan for the nomination)
- June 18, 1977 Elvis Presley, played to a sold-out arena, only two months prior to his death at age 42.

=== 1979 roof collapse ===
On June 4, 1979, at 6:45 p.m., a major storm with 70 mph (110 km/h) winds and heavy rains caused a portion of Kemper Arena's roof to collapse. Since the Arena was not in use at the time, no one was injured.

The American Institute of Architects had given the building an "Honor" award in 1976, and the AIA, coincidentally, was holding its annual national conference in Kansas City half a mile away at nearby Bartle Hall. The last event in the arena had been a Memorial Day concert by the Village People a week earlier, while Yes was scheduled to perform a show in its Tormato Tour on June 6. Further, the collapse coupled with the 1978 collapse of the Hartford Civic Center under heavy snow prompted architects to seriously reconsider computer models used to determine the safety of arenas. In response to that earlier incident, city architect Ken Coombs had announced that there was "very little likelihood of a disaster similar to Hartford's" occurring at Kemper Arena or Bartle Hall.

The arena was one of the first major projects by influential architect Helmut Jahn who was to take over the Murphy/Jahn firm founded by Charles Murphy. Steel trusses that hung from three huge portals supported the reinforced concrete roof. Design elements had called for compensating for winds that caused the roof to swing like a pendulum. The exterior skeleton design had been considered revolutionary in its simplicity (it was built in 18 months).

Two major factors contributed to the collapse. First, the roof had been designed to gradually release rainwater to avoid overloading sewers. This caused water to pond (where water fills in as the roof sagged), adding to the weight. Second, there had been a miscalculation on the strength of the bolts on the hangers when subjected to the 70 mph (110 km/h) winds while supporting the additional rainwater weight as the roof swung back and forth. Once one of the bolts gave way there was a cascading failure on the south side of the roof.

Approximately one acre, or 200 ft (61 m) × 215 ft (66 m) of roof collapsed. The air pressure, increased by the rapidly falling roof caused some of the walls to blow out. However, the portals remained undamaged.

The collapse forced the Kansas City Kings to play most of their home games during the 1979–80 season at Municipal Auditorium, which had been the team's primary venue before Kemper Arena was built. The arena's new roof was welded together instead of bolted, and it featured a state-of-the-art network of sensors intended to detect weaknesses in the structure. The arena reopened on February 20, 1980, with the Kings hosting the Seattle SuperSonics.

=== College basketball mecca ===
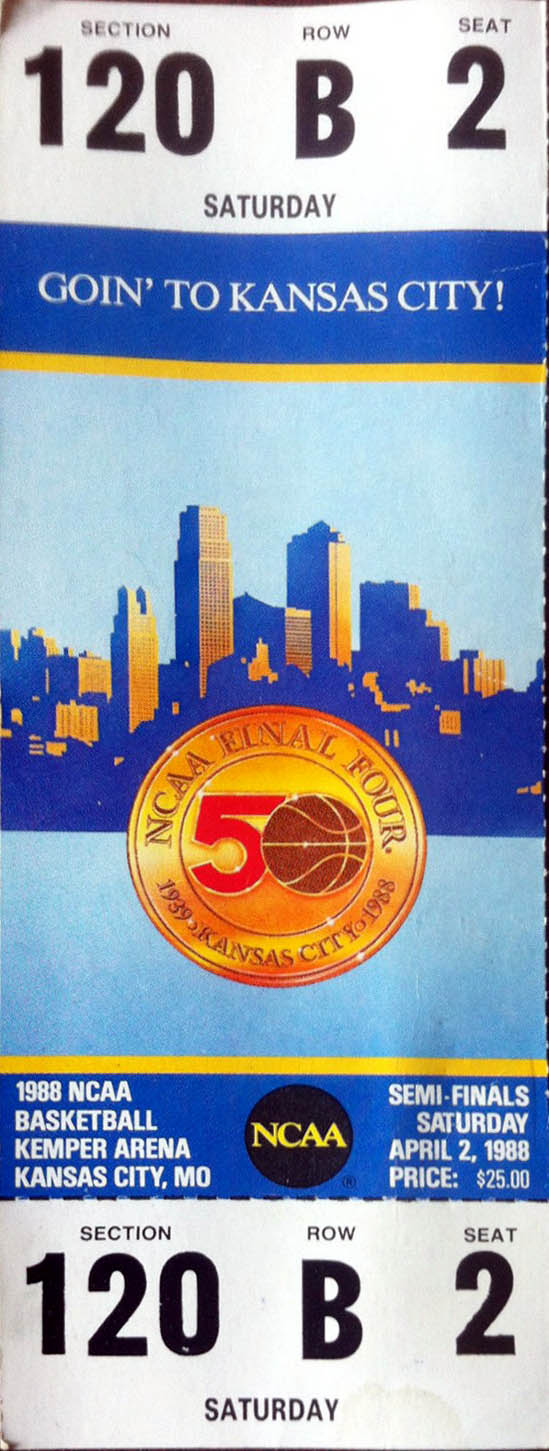
A ticket for the 1988 Men's NCAA Final Four

In the 1980s the arena became famed for its basketball tournaments including:

- NCAA Men's Final Four in 1988
- NCAA Women's Final Four in 1998
- NCAA Regionals – in 1983, 1986, 1992, and 1995
- NCAA First and Second Rounds – in 1997, 2001, and 2004
- NAIA basketball tournament from 1975 to 1993
- Big Eight Conference Men's Basketball Tournament from 1977 to 1996
- Big 12 Conference Men's Basketball tournament from 1997 to 2002 and 2005
- Guardians Classic in 2001
- Mid-Continent Conference men's basketball tournament in 2003 and 2004

=== Other professional sports ===
- 1974–1976 – Kansas City Scouts of the National Hockey League played in the arena before the team moved to Denver, becoming the Colorado Rockies; they later moved in 1982 to New Jersey, becoming the New Jersey Devils
- 1974–1985 – Kansas City Kings of the National Basketball Association who moved from Cincinnati, then to Sacramento
- 1981–1991 – Kansas City Comets of the original Major Indoor Soccer League (MISL)
- 1992–2005 – Kansas City Attack (later renamed the Kansas City Comets) of the National Professional Soccer League (NPSL) and a later version of the Major Indoor Soccer League (MISL)
- 1990–2001 – Kansas City Blades of the International Hockey League (IHL)
- 2000–2002 – Kansas City Knights of the American Basketball Association (ABA)
- 2004–2005 – Kansas City Outlaws of the United Hockey League (UHL)
- 2006–2007 – Kansas City Brigade of the Arena Football League
- 2007 – National Professional Paintball League (NPPL) makes its 4th stop of the 2007 season at Kemper. The event will be the first NPPL event held with a field indoors.
- 2013 – Kansas City Renegades of the Champions Professional Indoor Football League (CPIFL)

=== Professional wrestling ===
The Kemper Arena hosted Professional wrestling from 1984 until 2008. Promotions such as Central States Wrestling, WWE, National Wrestling Alliance, Universal Wrestling Federation, and World Championship Wrestling all held events there.

==== Death of Owen Hart ====
On May 23, 1999, the World Wrestling Federation (WWF, now WWE) hosted the Over the Edge pay-per-view event at Kemper Arena. During the event, Owen Hart, wrestling under his Blue Blazer gimmick, was to make a superhero-like ring entrance, which would have seen him descend from the arena rafters into the ring. He was, however, released prematurely when the harness line malfunctioned, and fell more than 70 feet (21 m) into the ring and later died at nearby Truman Medical Center-Hospital Hill. After the incident, the event was halted for 15 minutes, until Vince McMahon and other WWF Corporate officials made the decision to continue the event. Criticism later arose over the WWF's decision to continue the show after the accident. In court, his widow Martha, children, and parents sued the organization, contending that poor planning of the dangerous stunt caused Owen's death. WWF settled the case out of court, paying US$18 million to his widow, children, and parents. Due to the accident and controversy surrounding the event, the Over the Edge name was retired. The event was also not released for home video viewing until the launch of the WWE Network in 2014, where an edited version of the show that displays a tribute to Hart at the beginning but otherwise removes any mention of his involvement was released. In October 1999, Owen's brother, Bret Hart and longtime Hart family friend Chris Benoit had a tribute match in honor of Owen at Kemper Arena on WCW Monday Nitro.

=== 1990s additions and renovations ===
Additional American Royal livestock buildings were built adjoining Kemper in 1991–92 at a cost of $33.4 million (the City of Kansas City built the original American Royal Arena in 1922 nearby for about $650,000)

In 1997, a $23 million expansion made significant changes to the original Jahn design—most notably a glass-enclosed east lobby. Other changes include: 2,000 more seats, upgraded lower-level seating, four restrooms, and a handicapped entrance to the arena.

== Conversion to youth sports and community gym facility ==
In 2017–18, the arena underwent a $29 million renovation by Foutch Architecture and Development LLC to be converted into a youth sports facility. The renovated arena features 12 mixed-use hardwood basketball courts, four on the lower level and eight on the new upper level, and a 350-meter indoor running track. Each level also has spaces for retail services and commercial office space. The renovated arena was previously set to be known as Mosaic Arena as a result of a naming rights sponsorship by Mosaic Life Care; however, Mosaic Life Care released its naming rights sponsorship in December 2017. On May 17, 2018, Midwestern grocery store chain Hy-Vee secured the naming rights, making the arena's official name Hy-Vee Arena.

== American Royal ==
The American Royal Association formerly hosted livestock events at Kemper starting when it was first constructed. The Royal also helped pay for the original building. Its offices were located in the building along with the American Royal Museum. The Royal moved to a new complex that includes Hale Arena.

== See also ==
- List of indoor arenas in the United States
- List of National Basketball Association arenas
- List of National Hockey League arenas
- National Register of Historic Places listings in Jackson County, Missouri: Downtown Kansas City

Events and tenants
Preceded by Municipal Auditorium	Home of the Kansas City Kings; 1974–1985	Succeeded by Sacramento Sports Arena
Preceded by Miami Beach Convention Center	Host of the Republican National Convention; 1976	Succeeded by Joe Louis Arena
Preceded by Louisiana Superdome	NCAA Men's Division I Basketball tournament Finals Venue; 1988	Succeeded by Kingdome
Preceded by first arena	Home of the Kansas City Scouts; 1974–1976	Succeeded by McNichols Sports Arena
Preceded by first arena	Home of the Kansas City Brigade; 2006–2007	Succeeded by Sprint Center
