= West Bottoms =

Neighborhood of Kansas City, Kansas, U.S.

Coordinates: 39.102755°N 94.603441°W

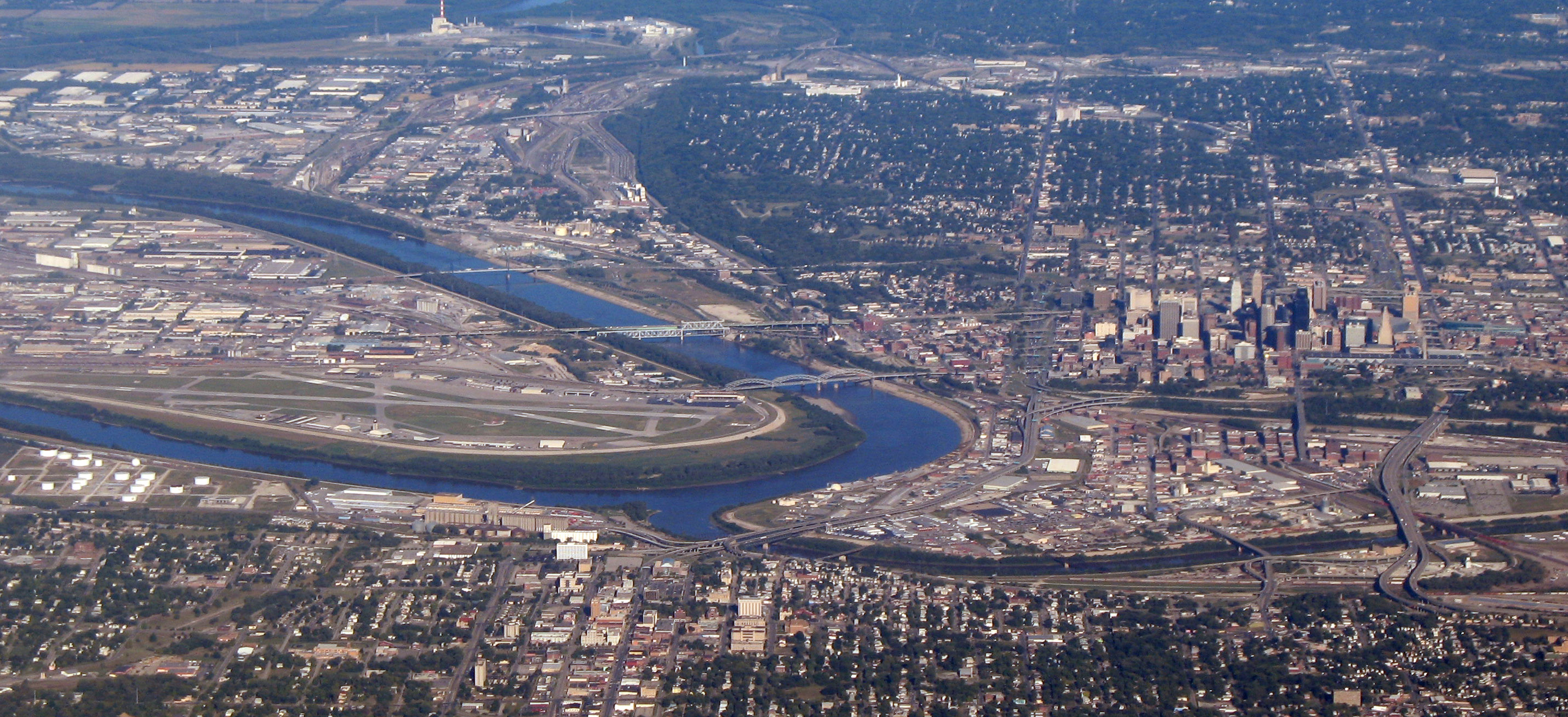
The West Bottoms is above the confluence of the Kansas and Missouri Rivers, facing Kaw Point.

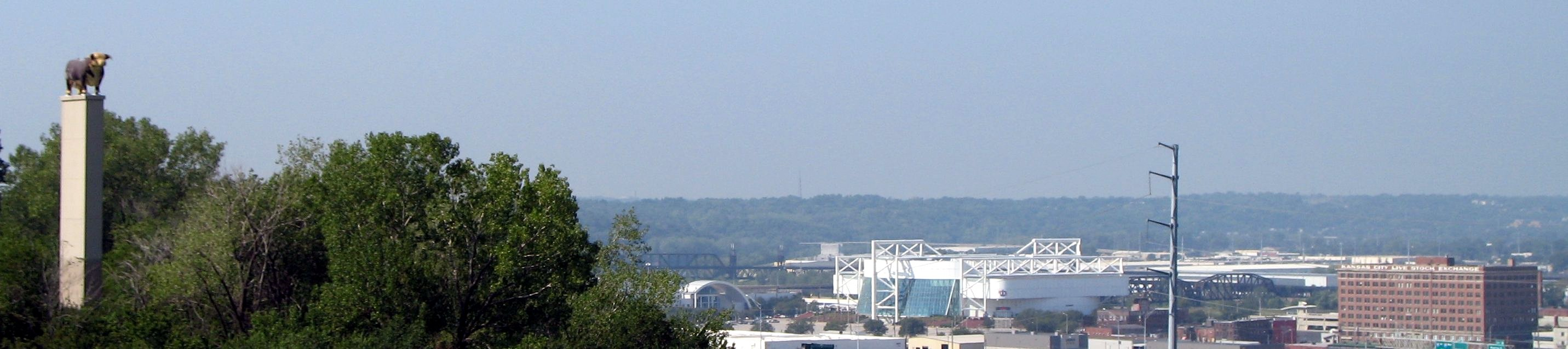
The American Hereford Association bull on Quality Hill, with Hy-Vee Arena and the Kansas City Livestock Exchange Building in the former stockyards of the West Bottoms

The West Bottoms is a historic industrial neighborhood of Kansas City, Missouri, immediately west of downtown and straddling the border of Kansas City, Missouri and Kansas City, Kansas. At the confluence of the Missouri River and the Kansas River, it faces Kaw Point, an early campsite of the Lewis and Clark Expedition. The region was originally settled by the native tribes, and this spot was permanently settled as part of French Bottoms in the early 1800s by François Chouteau for his trade with the tribes and early American pioneers. It is one of the oldest areas of the metro along with Westport. Its neighboring Quality Hill neighborhood is a historical center of the pioneer Town of Kansas, which became Kansas City, Missouri.

The West Bottoms is mostly characterized by brick high-rise historical industrial buildings, built in the early 1900s for major regional stockyards, train yards, and factories. Most of these were converted into art galleries, restaurants, shops, apartments, and corporate offices. Its antique shops and haunted house attractions are very popular.

== History ==
=== Founding and early history ===
The West Bottoms was founded as a livestock and meatpacking district in 1871. It was home to the Kansas City Live Stock Exchange, Kansas City Stockyards, and the city's first Union railway depot. The stockyards occupied more than two hundred acres and were surrounded by hotels, offices, shops, and banks for cattle buyers and cowboys. As the industrial center of Kansas City, the West Bottoms attracted unskilled laborers seeking employment. Recent European immigrants, native-born white and African Americans arrived to work in West Bottoms factories and settled in tenements and boarding houses there. The area became known as a red-light district, with numerous saloons, gambling dens, and brothels catering to the high volume of railway passengers passing through Kansas City daily.

In 1876, James "Jim" Pendergast, son of Irish immigrants who had settled in St. Joseph, Missouri, moved to the West Bottoms to find employment. Pendergast lived in boarding houses and worked in meatpacking and then in several iron foundries in the neighborhood. In 1881, Pendergast purchased the American House saloon and hotel on St. Louis Avenue. This West Bottoms establishment served as a gambling den, informal bank, and headquarters for political organizing for Jim and his brother Tom Pendergast, architects of the Pendergast political machine that controlled Kansas City for the next four decades.

In the late 1800s and early 1900s, immigrants from Eastern and Central Europe were recruited to work in West Bottoms meatpacking facilities due to strikes by local workers. These immigrants first settled in an area known as the "Strawberry Patch" near the meatpacking plants. Then, after the flood of 1903, they founded the nearby historic neighborhood of Strawberry Hill uphill from the "Strawberry Patch." Serbs founded St. George Serbian Orthodox Church on April 18, 1906. The community purchased two houses on North 1st Street. One was converted to a church and the other used as a parish home. The parish stayed in the West Bottoms until 1925.

=== World War II ===
During World War II, Darby Steel Corporation built most of the landing craft tanks (LCTs) for various amphibious invasions. The plant built one craft per day and floated them more than 1,000 miles (1,600 km) down the Missouri and Mississippi Rivers to New Orleans, Louisiana, prompting their "Prairie Ships" nickname. Darby's plant at the mouth of the Kansas River could hold eight 135í LCTs and 16 LCMs in various stages of construction. The American Royal livestock show at Kemper Arena was the site of the 1976 Republican National Convention.

=== Historic floods ===
The low-lying area of the West Bottoms, close to the Missouri River, has always been prone to floods. In 1903, a major flood damaged West Bottoms businesses, shut down water and power in the city, and persuaded developers to choose a new location for the Union station railway depot. In 1946, construction began on a $1.5 billion flood wall to protect the meatpacking and livestock business, as part of the Pick-Sloan Missouri Basin Program. However, the Great Flood of 1951 severely damaged the West Bottoms stockyards, and the meatpacking industry in Kansas City never fully recovered.

== Notable people ==
- Ed Asner, actor
