= Kansas City Stockyards =

Stockyards in the United States

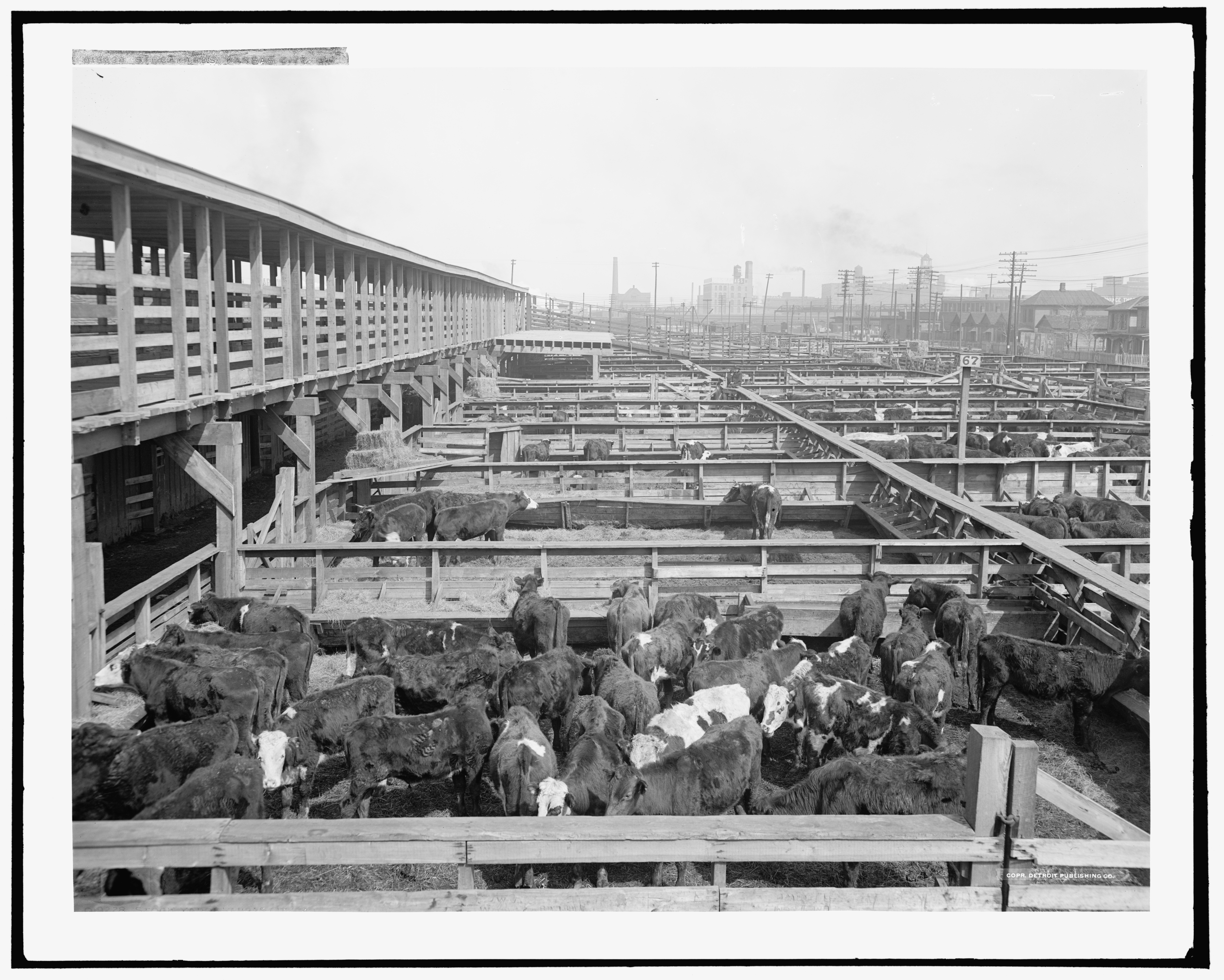
Kansas City Stockyards (1906)

The Kansas City Stockyards in the West Bottoms west of downtown Kansas City, Missouri, flourished from 1871 until 1951, closed in 1991.

== History ==
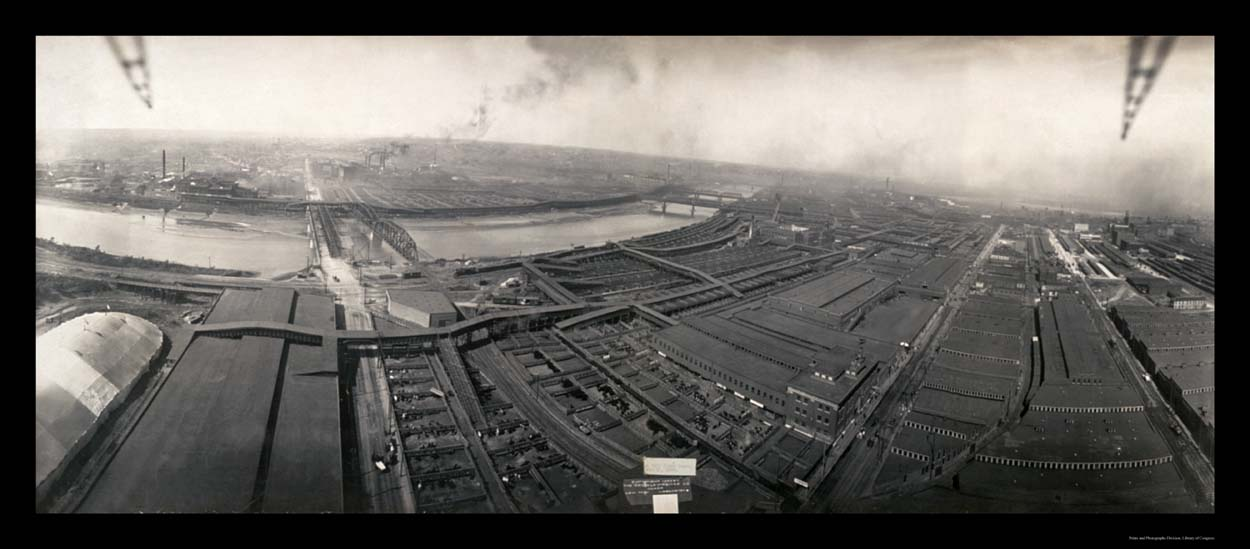
Kansas City Stockyards (1909)

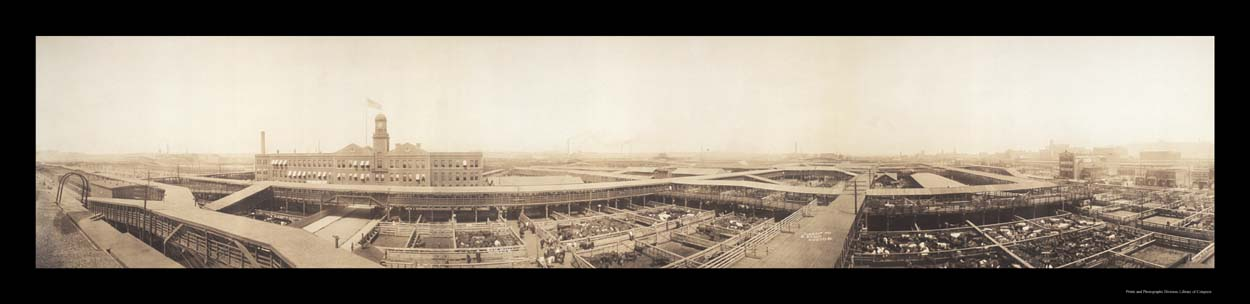
Kansas City Stockyards with the Livestock Exchange Building (1904)

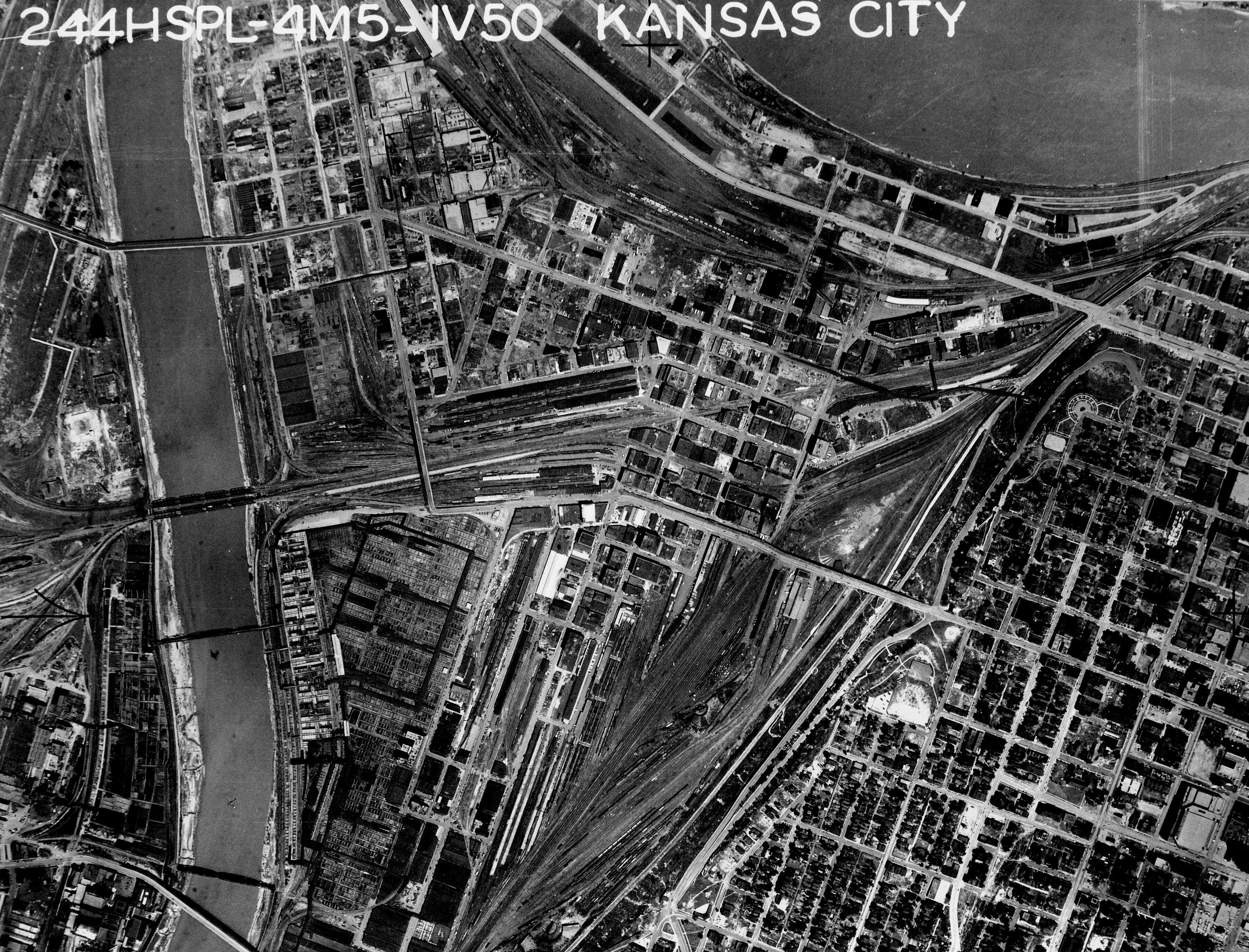
View of stockyards & surrounding area (1940s)

The stockyards were built to provide better prices for livestock owners. Previously, livestock owners west of Kansas City could only sell at whatever price the railroad offered. With the Kansas City Livestock Exchange and the Stockyards, cattle were sold to the highest bidder.

The stockyards were built around the facilities of the Central Overland California and Pikes Peak Express Company which had outfitted travelers on the Santa Fe Trail and Oregon Trail following the Kansas River. The company went out of business in 1862 following the failure of its Pony Express business from St. Joseph, Missouri, to Sacramento, California.

The stockyards were established in 1871 on the Kansas side of the Kansas River along the Kansas Pacific and Missouri Pacific railroad tracks. In 1878 it expanded from its original 13 acres (53,000 m^{2}) to 55, added loading docks on both the Kansas and Missouri Pacific tracks, new sheds for hogs and sheep, and developed one of the largest horse and mule markets in the country.

According to the Kansas City Kansan: "In the heyday year of 1923, 2,631,808 cattle were received at the Kansas City yards. Of these, 1,194,527 were purchased for use in Kansas City by the packing houses and local markets; the remainder or about 55 percent was shipped out. Of 2,736,174 hogs received, 879,031 were shipped out; of 377,038 calves, 199,084 were shipped out; of 1,165,606 sheep, 445,539 were shipped and of 42,987 horses and mules, all but 1,664 were shipped out."

The stockyards flourished through the 1940s. At its peak only the Union Stock Yards in Chicago was bigger. Business dropped off dramatically after the Great Flood of 1951 which devastated the stockyards and associated businesses and slaughterhouses. After the flood, the stockyards never recovered.

The stockyards straddled the state line, which runs through the site on the east side of the Kansas river; two-thirds of it were located in Kansas and one-third in Missouri. Quarantine yards were located on the west side of the river. At its peak 16 railroads converged at the yards.

Jay B. Dillingham was the President of the stockyards from 1948 to its closing in 1991.

== Recently ==
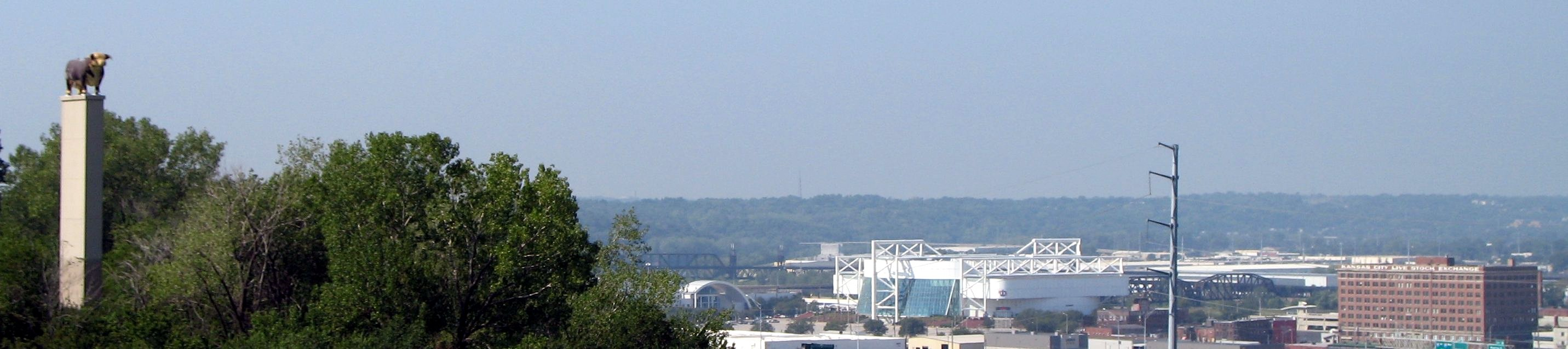
The American Hereford Association bull and Kemper Arena and the Kansas City Live Stock Exchange Building in the former stockyards of the West Bottoms as seen from Quality Hill

In 1974 the City of Kansas City and the American Royal livestock show tried to reclaim the area by building Kemper Arena on the former stockyards land. The closing of the stockyards ended Kansas City's overt ties to being a cowtown. The stockyard's biggest heritage then became the annual six-week American Royal agricultural show held each October and November nearby at Kemper Arena until 2010. The naming rights to Kemper Arena were sold to Mosaic Life Care in 2016, but the healthcare company gave them back. In May 2018, the developers of Kemper Arena announced that it would be called Hy-Vee Arena. The American Royal livestock show is moving to a new location in Kansas near Kansas Speedway.
