= Great Flood of 1951 =

1951 Central US weather disaster

In mid-July 1951, heavy rains led to a great rise of water in the Kansas River, Missouri River, and other surrounding areas of the Central United States. Flooding occurred in the Kansas, Neosho, Marais Des Cygnes, and Verdigris river basins. The damage in June and July 1951 across eastern Kansas and Missouri exceeded $935 million (equivalent to $11.6 billion in 2025). The flooding killed 17 people and displaced 518,000.

== Flood ==
The 1951 flood in Kansas began in May with the flood of the Big Creek, (a tributary of the Smoky Hill River) in Hays after 11 inches (280 mm) of rain in two hours. The creek overflowed, flooding Hays (the location of Fort Hays State University) to a depth of 4 feet (1.2 m) in most locations inhabited by the students on campus, necessitating a midnight evacuation of the barracks by families on the G.I. Bill and dorms to the Stadium's third floor, which was still dry. Dr. Charles F. Wiest, Professor of Philosophy and Religion, and his seven-year-old daughter perished when their home caved in under the weight of the water while he was attempting to save prized texts in his basement. All records at the college were ruined and no graduation was held on the appointed date of May 23. Graduates were mailed their diplomas one month later.

At the time, there were no warning sirens in Hays. Two police officers drove the low riding streets with their sirens blaring, shouting to evacuate. They are credited with saving many lives.

The flooding continued into June 1951 with heavy rains. The flooding reached its zenith when between 8 and 16 inches (410 mm) fell on the region between July 9 and July 13. The flood levels reached their highest point since the Great Flood of 1844 and Flood of 1903. July 13 experienced the single highest levels of flood, leading to the greatest destruction by flood in the Midwest as of then.

The specific flood-levels are not accurately known for the Kansas River, as the water crested above all official flood gauges. However, between Manhattan and Bonner Springs flood levels were between 4 feet (1.2 m) and 6 feet (1.8 m) above all previous records. The Marais Des Cygnes River, Verdigris River, and Neosho River crested more than 9 feet (2.7 m) above previous records.

The heaviest initial damage by the flood crest was to Manhattan and Fort Riley. Barracks at the Fort were destroyed, and in Manhattan the downtown business district was deluged under 8 feet (2.4 m) of water and two people were killed. Then, Topeka and Lawrence were damaged by the same crest. Approximately 24,000 people were evacuated from Topeka.

In the Kansas City Metropolitan Area, the flood began running over the top of the levees protecting the Argentine and Armourdale areas, resulting in the evacuation of 15,000 people. Water reached the rooftops of houses in Armourdale. The flood devastated the Kansas City Stockyards in the West Bottoms at the confluence of the Kansas and Missouri Rivers. The Stockyards never fully recovered. The flood destroyed the TWA overhaul base at Fairfax Airport in Kansas City, Kansas prompting the city of Kansas City, Missouri, to relocate TWA to a new airport in Platte County, Missouri that later became Kansas City International Airport.

On July 13, a total of 1,074,000 acres (4,350 km^{2}) in Kansas and 926,000 acres (3,750 km^{2}) in Missouri were flooded.

The crest continued downstream passing through Boonville, Missouri on July 17, Jefferson City, Missouri on July 18, Hermann, Missouri on July 19, and St. Charles, Missouri on July 20, resulting in further flooding.

On July 17, President Harry Truman toured the damage by airplane, as far west as Manhattan, and declared the disaster "one of the worst this country has ever suffered from water".

== Flood levels ==
=== Kansas River ===
City	River crest	Height above flood stage	Date of measurement
Manhattan	33.4 ft (10.2 m)	15.4 ft (4.7 m)	July 13
Wamego	30.56 ft (9.31 m)	11.6 ft (3.5 m)	July 13
Topeka	40.8 ft (12.4 m)	14.8 ft (4.5 m)	July 13
Lecompton	30.23 ft (9.21 m)	13.25 ft (4.04 m)	July 13
Lawrence	29.9 ft (9.1 m)	11.9 ft (3.6 m)	July 13
De Soto	42.3 ft (12.8 m)	16.3 ft (5.0 m)	July 13

=== Marais Des Cygnes River ===
City	River crest	Height above flood stage	Date of measurement
Ottawa	42.97 ft (13.10 m)	11.97 ft (3.65 m)	July 11

=== Neosho River ===
City	River crest	Height above flood stage	Date of measurement
Emporia	33.4 ft (10.2 m)	13.4 ft (4.1 m)	July 11
Neosho Rapids	34.3 ft (10.5 m)	12.3 ft (3.7 m)	July 11
Leroy	34.48 ft (10.51 m)	11.48 ft (3.50 m)	July 12
Burlington	41.53 ft (12.66 m)	14.53 ft (4.43 m)	July 12

== Outcome ==
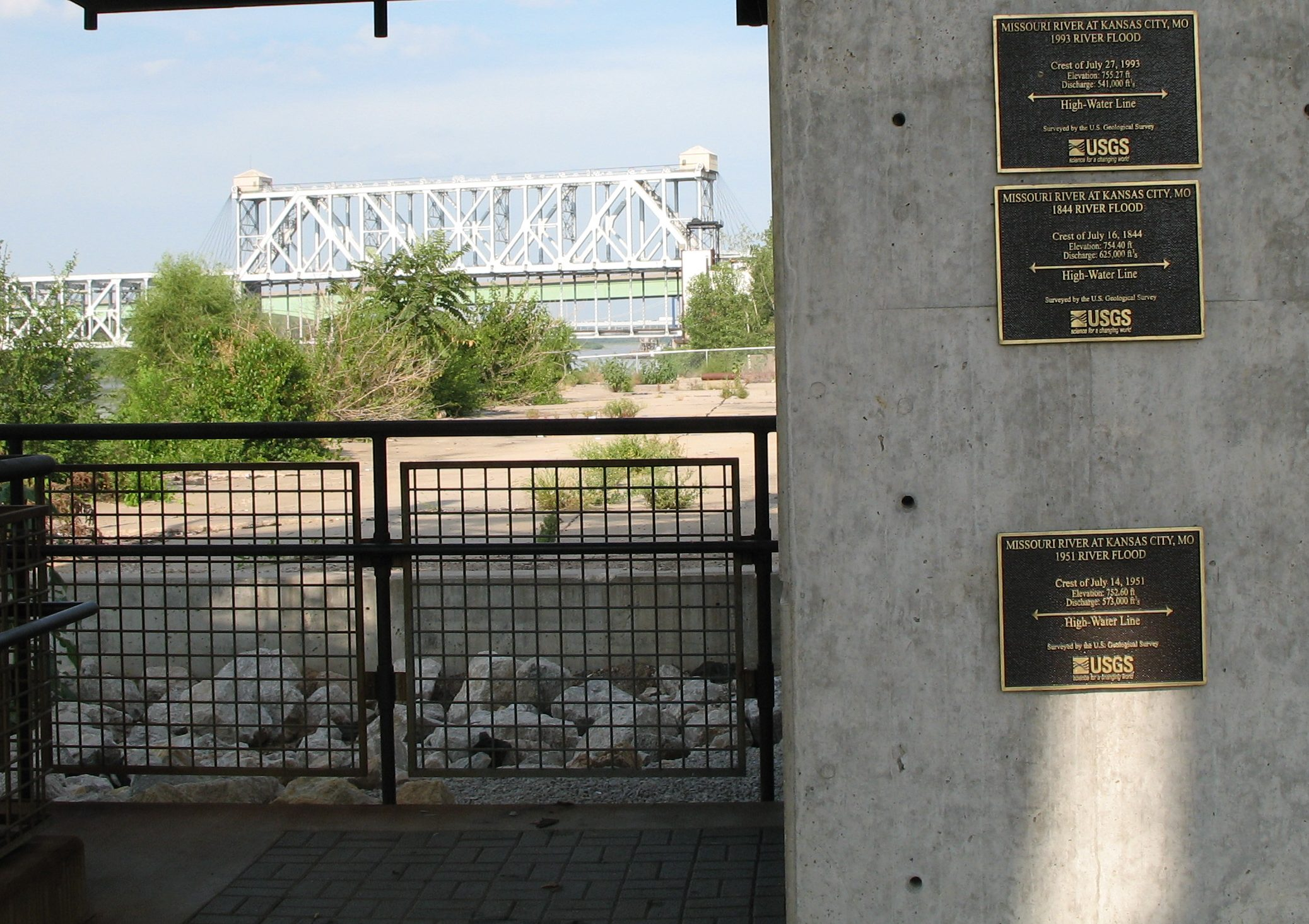
This USGS exhibit shows flood levels at Westport Landing on the Missouri River in Kansas City. The ASB Bridge is in the background.

Following this flood, a series of levees and reservoirs were constructed throughout eastern Kansas. This new network of flood control structures helped to prevent widespread damage when the region was hit by the Great Flood of 1993.

Prior to the flood, five federal flood control dams were operating in the Kansas River basin: Bonny Dam in Colorado, Enders Dam and Medicine Creek Dam in Nebraska, and Cedar Bluff Dam and Kanopolis Dam in Kansas.

Several others had been planned by the United States Army Corps of Engineers and the Bureau of Reclamation, both authorized by the Flood Control Act of 1944.

Since then, many dams have been constructed with a total of eighteen dams controlling the flow of the Kansas River, such as Webster Dam and Kirwin Dam on tributaries of the Solomon River in Kansas. Many other reservoirs and levees were built in other nearby basins, which were also built as part of the response to this flood. This includes the Osage River basin above the Lake of the Ozarks.

North Lawrence has a building shaped like a teepee, with a mark on the side indicating the water height of 7 feet (2.1 m) around the building.

In 2011, the painting Flood Disaster by Thomas Hart Benton was sold for $1.9 million in an auction at Sotheby's in New York City. Benton had made the painting at the time of the flood and sent lithographs to every member of Congress to support a flood appropriations bill.

== See also ==
- Floods in the United States
