= Representative Mann =

Representative Mann may refer to any of the following politicians who hold or previously held that title:

- Tracey Mann (born 1976), a US representative from Kansas' 1st district
- Douglas Mann (politician), a former state representative from Missouri's 50th district
- Homer B. Mann (1869-1950), a member of the Missouri House of Representatives
- Abijah Mann Jr. (1793-1868), a US representative from New York's 16th district
- Franklin B. Mann (1941-2022), a state representative from Florida's 90th district
- George Mann (politician) (1918-1984), a member of the Minnesota House of Representatives
- James Mann (1822–1868), a member of the Maine House of Representatives and a US representative from Louisiana's 2nd district
- James Mann (South Carolina politician) (1920-2010), a member of the South Carolina House of Representatives and a US representative from South Carolina's 4th district
- James Robert Mann (Illinois politician) (1856-1922), House Minority Leader and US representative from Illinois' 1st and 2nd districts
- John Mann (New Hampshire politician), a state representative from New Hampshire's 2nd district
- Joseph Mann (born 1955), a state representative from Connecticut's 140th district
- Shwe Mann (born 1947), 1st Speaker of the Burmese House of Representatives

== See also ==
- Senator Mann (disambiguation)
- Mann (surname)
