= Helen Johnson =

Helen Johnson may refer to:

- Helen Johnson (artist) (born 1979), Australian artist
- Helen Kendrick Johnson (1844–1917), American writer, poet, and activist
- Judith Wood (1906–2002), American film actress, born Helen Johnson
- Helen Johnson-Leipold (fl. 1970s–2020s), née Johnson, American billionaire businesswoman
- Helen Moore Johnson (1889–1967), American academic

== See also ==
- Helene Johnson (1906–1995), African-American poet
- Helen Johnson Houghton (1910–2012), British racehorse trainer
- Helen Johnston (1891–1969), American physician and clubwoman
