= Helen Moore Johnson =

South Asian scholar (1889–1967)

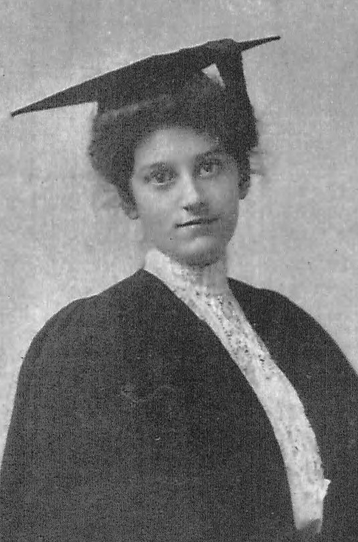
- Helen Moore Johnson, from the 1907 yearbook of the University of Missouri
- Born: October 14, 1889; Osceola, Missouri, U.S.
- Died: June 26, 1967 (aged 77)
- Education: University of Missouri; University of Wisconsin (PhD)
- Notable work: English translation of the Trishashti Shalaka Purusha Charita
- Relatives: Waldo P. Johnson (grandfather); William Tell Johnson (uncle)

Helen Moore Johnson (October 14, 1889 – June 26, 1967) was an American Sanskrit scholar and classics professor. She was named a Guggenheim Fellow in 1927, appointed for research in Jainism. Her work includes the English translation of the hagiographical work Trishashti Shalaka Purusha in six volumes.

== Early life and education ==
Johnson was born in Osceola, Missouri, the daughter of Thomas Moore Johnson and Alice Barr Johnson. Her father was a lawyer, translator, and publisher, interested in theosophy. Her grandfather, Waldo P. Johnson, was a Confederate States Senator; one of her uncles was another Missouri politician, William Tell Johnson. She earned her bachelor's and master's degrees at the University of Missouri, in 1907 and 1908 respectively. She pursued further studies at Tulane University and Bryn Mawr College, and completed doctoral studies at the University of Wisconsin in 1912.

== Career ==
Johnson was a professor at the Oklahoma College for Women from 1913 to 1916. She taught Latin and Greek at the Oxford College for Women in Ohio, in 1919 and 1920. She held the AAUW's Alice Freeman Palmer Memorial fellowship to study in India from 1920 to 1921. She was based at Johns Hopkins University from 1924 to 1926. In 1927, she was awarded a Guggenheim Fellowship for her research on Jainism. In the late 1940s and the early 1960s, she spent more years studying in Baroda, India.

== Publications ==
Johnson published an English translation of the hagiographical work Trishashti Shalaka Purusha in six volumes. Her worked appeared in scholarly journals, including The Classical Weekly, Journal of the American Oriental Society and American Journal of Philology.

- "The Portrayal of the Dog on Greek Vases" (1919)
- "The Story of the Thief Rāuhiṇeya in the Mahāvīracaritra of Hemacandra" (1924)
- "Historical References in Hemacandra's Mahāvīracaritra" (1925)
- "A New Account of the Relations between Mahāvīra and Gośāla" (1926)
- "The Lemon in India" (1936)
- "Conversion of Vikrama Saṃvat Dates" (1938)
- "The Date of Divālī" (1939)
- "Grains of Mediaeval India" (1941)
- "Tamāla and vetra" (1944)
- "The Udayana-Vāsavadattā Romance in Hemacandra" (1946)
- "Gama and Cara" (1946)
- "Rohinī-Aśokacandrakathā" (1948)
- "Śāntamūrti Munirāj Śrī Jayantavijayaji" (1949)

== Personal life ==
Johnson was injured in a car accident in 1939. She died in 1967, at the age of 77.
