= Dunlap Colored Cemetery =

Historic cemetery in Morris County, Kansas

- U.S. National Register of Historic Places
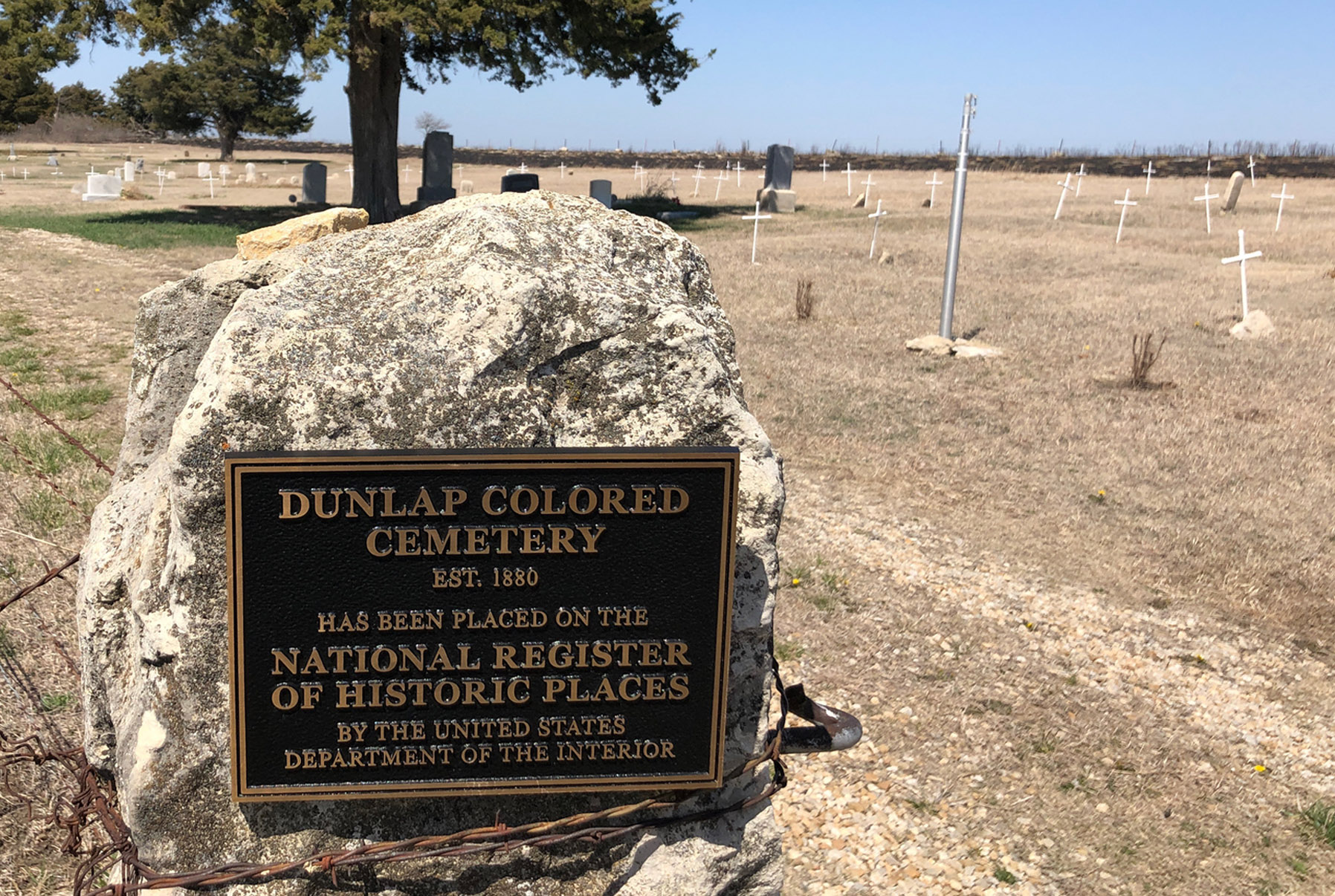

- Location within Kansas
- Location: 2050 S. 100 Rd., Dunlap, Kansas
- Coordinates: 38°35′15″N 96°12′12″W
- Built: 1880
- NRHP reference No.: 100002967
- Added to NRHP: September 14, 2018

Dunlap Colored Cemetery is a historic cemetery at 2050 S. 100 Road in Dunlap, Kansas. The cemetery was established in 1880 as part of the Dunlap Colony, a community of Exodusters, or African-American former slaves who moved from the South to Kansas after emancipation. Benjamin "Pap" Singleton, an abolitionist who escaped slavery in the 1840s and an early leader of the Exoduster movement, founded the Dunlap Colony in 1878. When white settlers in Dunlap objected to sharing the preexisting local cemetery with the new black settlers, the Exodusters created their own cemetery. While the first burial at the cemetery took place in 1880, the cemetery trustees did not actually own the cemetery's land until 1893. The community held annual Emancipation Day celebrations on September 22 that included a procession to the cemetery to honor their ancestors; they also conducted Memorial Day and Veterans Day ceremonies for the veterans buried there. The Dunlap Colony's black population began to decline in the 1890s and onward as charitable support for the community ran out; the last Emancipation Day celebration took place in 1931, effectively marking the end of Dunlap's black community. Those buried in the cemetery include Columbus Johnson, one of Singleton's business partners, and Ralph Maddox and A. J. Howard, both Exodusters and cofounders of the cemetery.

The cemetery was added to the National Register of Historic Places on September 14, 2018.
