= Arthur Chapman =

Arthur Chapman may refer to:

- Arthur Chapman (English cricketer) (1834–1867), English cricketer
- Arthur Chapman (agent) (1838–1909), businessman in Adelaide, South Australia
- Arthur Chapman (New Zealand cricketer) (1861–1950), New Zealand cricketer
- Arthur Chapman (Missouri politician) (1863–1928), American businessman and politician
- Arthur Chapman (poet) (1873–1935), American cowboy poet and newspaper columnist
- Percy Chapman (1900–1961), English cricketer, full name Arthur Percy Frank Chapman
- Art Chapman (ice hockey) (1905–1962), Canadian ice hockey player
- Arthur B. Chapman (1908–2004), British-American animal genetic researcher
- Art Chapman (basketball) (1912–1986), Canadian basketball player
