= Senator Patterson =

Senator Patterson may refer to:

== Members of the United States Senate ==
- David T. Patterson (1818–1891), U.S. Senator from Tennessee from 1866 to 1869
- James W. Patterson (1823–1893), U.S. Senator from New Hampshire from 1867 to 1873
- John J. Patterson (1830–1912), U.S. Senator from South Carolina from 1873 to 1879
- Roscoe C. Patterson (1876–1954), U.S. Senator from Missouri from 1929 to 1935
- Thomas M. Patterson (1839–1916), U.S. Senator from Colorado from 1901 to 1907

== United States state senate members ==
- Albert Patterson (1894–1954), Alabama State Senate
- Bruce Patterson (politician) (born 1947), Michigan State Senate
- Frank N. Patterson Jr. (1917–1971), North Carolina State Senate
- George W. Patterson (Oregon politician) (1857–1932), Oregon State Senate
- I. L. Patterson (1859–1929), Oregon State Senate
- J. O. Patterson Jr. (1935–2011), Tennessee State Senate
- Jerry E. Patterson (born 1946), Texas State Senate
- John Patterson (Ohio congressman) (1771–1848), Ohio State Senate
- Joseph M. Patterson (politician) (1837–1914), Illinois State Senate
- Julia Patterson (born 1953), Washington State Senate
- Kay Patterson (South Carolina politician) (born 1931), South Carolina State Senate
- Liz J. Patterson (1939–2018), South Carolina State Senate
- Obie Patterson (born 1938), Maryland State Senate
- Paul L. Patterson (1900–1956), Oregon State Senate
- Samuel F. Patterson (1799–1874), North Carolina State Senate
- Samuel L. Patterson (1850–1908), North Carolina State Senate
- Thomas C. Patterson (fl. 1980s–2010s), Arizona State Senate
- Thomas Patterson (Arizona politician) (born 1945), Arizona State Senate

== See also ==
- Senator Paterson (disambiguation)
- John M. Pattison (1847–1906), Ohio State Senate
