= Carrie Westlake Whitney =

First director of the Kansas City Public Library (1854–1934)

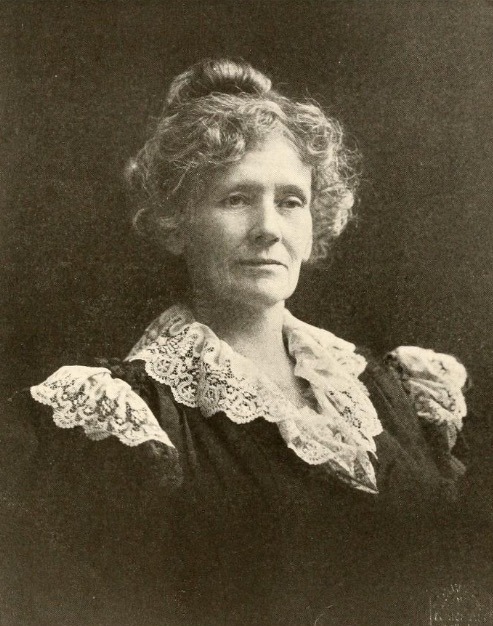
- Born: Carrie Westlake; 1854; Fayette County, Virginia, U.S.
- Died: April 8, 1934 (aged 79–80); Kansas City, Missouri, U.S.
- Resting place: Forest Hill Calvary Cemetery; Kansas City, Missouri, U.S.
- Other name: Carrie Westlake Judson
- Occupation: Head Librarian for the Kansas City Public Library
- Spouses: E. W. Judson (m. 1875) James Steele Whitney (m. 1885; died 1890)

Carrie Westlake Whitney (1854 – April 8, 1934) was an American librarian. Known as the mother of Kansas City, Missouri's library system, she was the first director of the Kansas City Public Library.

By 1897, Whitney had fully ended the library's subscription model, and all city residents were allowed access to the library. The collection, which was described as "2,000 catalogued books, plus about a thousand volumes of government documents, reports, and periodicals," was enlarged to 30,000 items by 1897. By 1899, the solo library had grown to include a staff of 28 adults and nine young male pages. In 1901, she was elected to be the first president of the Missouri Library Association.

Whitney had strong opinions about reading, including keeping reading for younger people tightly controlled claiming, "One unwholesome book will contaminate an entire school."

In 1908, she published a three-volume history entitled Kansas City, Missouri: Its History and its People which included biographies of notable local people as well as a history of the city. She was demoted from her position to assistant librarian in 1910 with The Kansas City Journal saying her position should be held by a man, an opinion supported by the local Board of Education. She was replaced by Purd Wright—who had come back to Missouri after one year at the head of Los Angeles Public Library—and was terminated in 1912.

== Personal life ==
Carrie Westlake was born in 1854 on a plantation in Fayette County, Virginia, to Wellington and Helen Van Waters Westlake.

In 1861, her family moved to Pettis County Missouri near Sedalia. She was sent to a private school in Saint Louis soon afterward. In 1875, Westlake married E. W. Judson in Sedalia when she was twenty-one years of age. In October 1979, she gave birth to her first and only child, Edith Westlake Judson, who died moments after being born. Westlake was already separated from her husband at this time. After the death of her infant daughter, she requested a divorce from the Jackson County Courthouse. The divorce was granted in 1881 when her husband was found guilty of adultery. In 1885, she married newspaperman James Steele Whitney; he died of tuberculosis in 1890. She spent the last four decades of her life living with Miss Frances Bishop, whom her obituary described as an "inseparable friend".

Carrie Whitney died on April 8, 1934, and is buried in the Forest Hill Calvary Cemetery in Kansas City, Missouri.

== Career ==
Carrie Westlake first found work as a bookkeeper in Kansas City while boarding with the Greenwood family, whose head of household happened to be Dr. James Greenwood, the superintendent of Kansas City for over 30 years. Her close relationship with the Greenwood's was what kick-started her career, because in 1881 when funding became available for the city to have its first public librarian, Dr. Greenwood chose Westlake for the job, in addition to the position she already held as his assistant and Board of Education agent. The superintendent gave her the incredibly high praise of the "smartest woman I have ever known."

Beginning with a $30 monthly salary, Westlake was making $183 dollars a month by 1903, by which time she was well-known to citizens of Kansas City and had become Mrs. Westlake Whitney. In 1978, a story in The Star quoted her as saying that, "All men are afraid of books who did not handle them in infancy," and in accordance with this belief, she added a separate children's section to the Kansas City Public Library, which was believed to be one of the first of its kind in America. She had achieved massive success in an era dominated by patriarchy, and earned the moniker "Mother of the Kansas City Public Library," but it was not to last. A majority of men on the Board of Education deemed her unfit for the position of library an account of her gender, and she was demoted to assistant librarian in 1911, where she worked under male supervision. Clearly, this was not enough for the men who wanted to be rid of her, as she was forced to retire from her new position only two years later.
