= Senator Paterson (disambiguation) =

William Paterson (judge) (1745–1806) was a U.S. Senator from New Jersey from 1789 to 1790. Senator Paterson may also refer to:

- Basil A. Paterson (1926–2014), New York State Senate
- David Paterson (born 1954), New York State Senate
- John E. Paterson (1800–before 1885), New York State Senate
- Lloyd H. Paterson (1925–1988), New York State Senate

== See also ==
- Senator Patterson (disambiguation)
