= Union Cemetery (Kansas City, Missouri) =

Public cemetery in Missouri, US

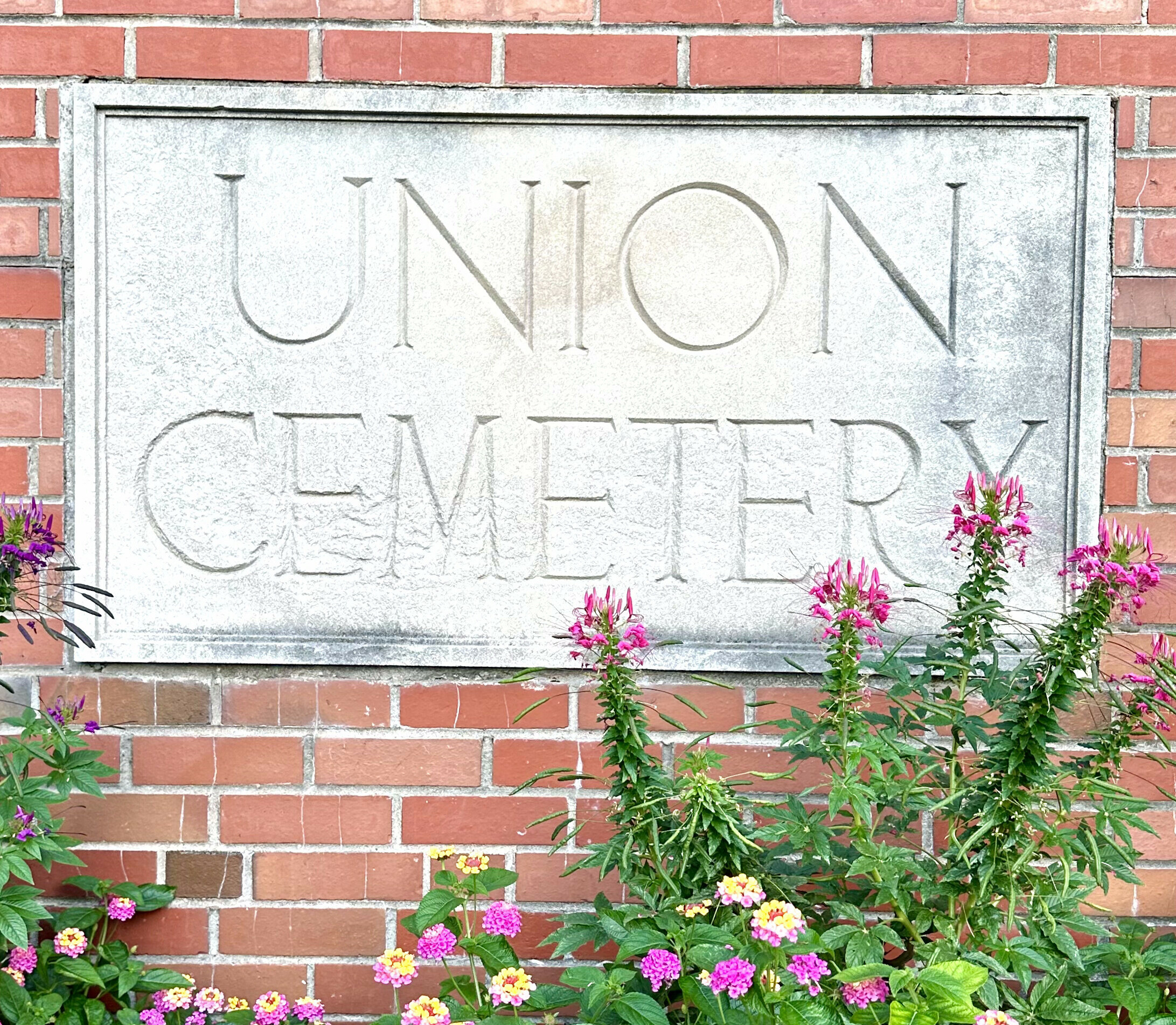
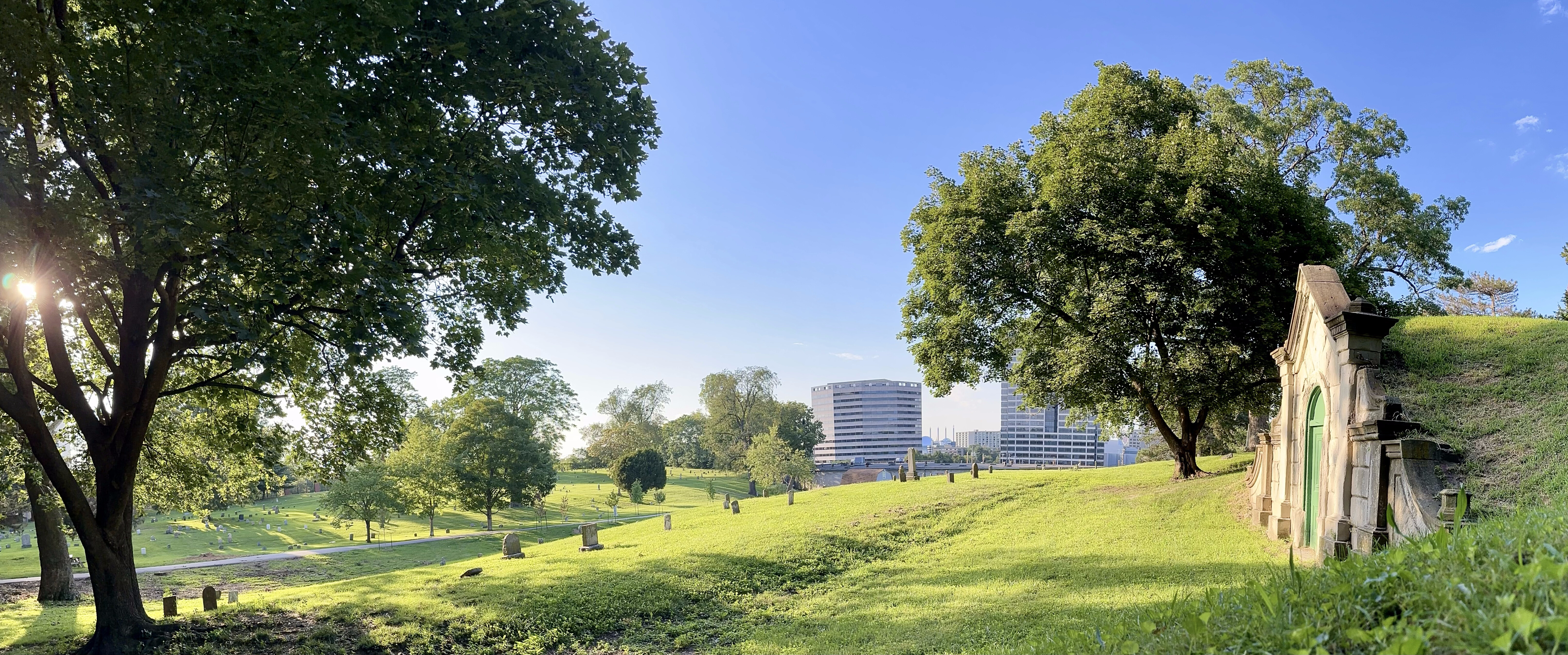
- The in-ground public receiving vault overlooks the northwest potter's field of graves, with countless unmarked. The Kansas City skyline includes the Kauffman Center, the Convention Center, Downtown, Crown Center, and the Western Auto Building.
- Interactive map of Union Cemetery

Details
- Established: November 9, 1857; 168 years ago
- Location: 227 E. 28th Terrace, Kansas City, Missouri
- Country: United States
- Coordinates: 39°4′32″N 94°34′52″W
- Owned by: KC Parks & Recreation
- No. of interments: 55,000, estimated
- Website: uchskc.org, kcparks.org
- Find a Grave: Union Cemetery
- Union Cemetery
- U.S. National Register of Historic Places
- NRHP reference No.: 16000183
- Added to NRHP: 2016

Union Cemetery is the oldest surviving public cemetery in Kansas City, Missouri. It was founded on November 9, 1857, as the private shareholder-owned corporation, Union Cemetery Assembly. As a commercial enterprise remote from city limits, its 49 acres (20 ha) became a well-funded and remarkably landscaped destination by 1873.

Through the late 1800s and early 1900s, it declined into haphazard burial practices and virtually no maintenance. Some graves (including some shallow or mass graves) were permanently unmarked, unidentifiable, and human remains were scattered into the potter's field. In 1889, all records were lost when the sexton's cottage burned. In the early 1900s, human remains were inadvertently plowed and dynamited up during development of roads and businesses. A legacy of lawsuits and public campaigns from the 1910s through the 1930s led by bereaved families, including survivors of area settlers and boosters, created new leadership and city park status with accorded maintenance.

Union Cemetery is now a public park and tourist attraction occupying most of the Union Hill historic neighborhood. It neighbors the historic National World War I Museum and Memorial, Union Station, Downtown, and Crown Center. It is curated by the non-profit Union Cemetery Historical Society (launched in 1984) and maintained by the Kansas City Parks & Recreation department. Its estimated 55,000 bodies include those of hundreds of American pioneers, Kansas City boosters, and American Civil War Union veterans such as George Caleb Bingham and Johnston Lykins.

== History ==
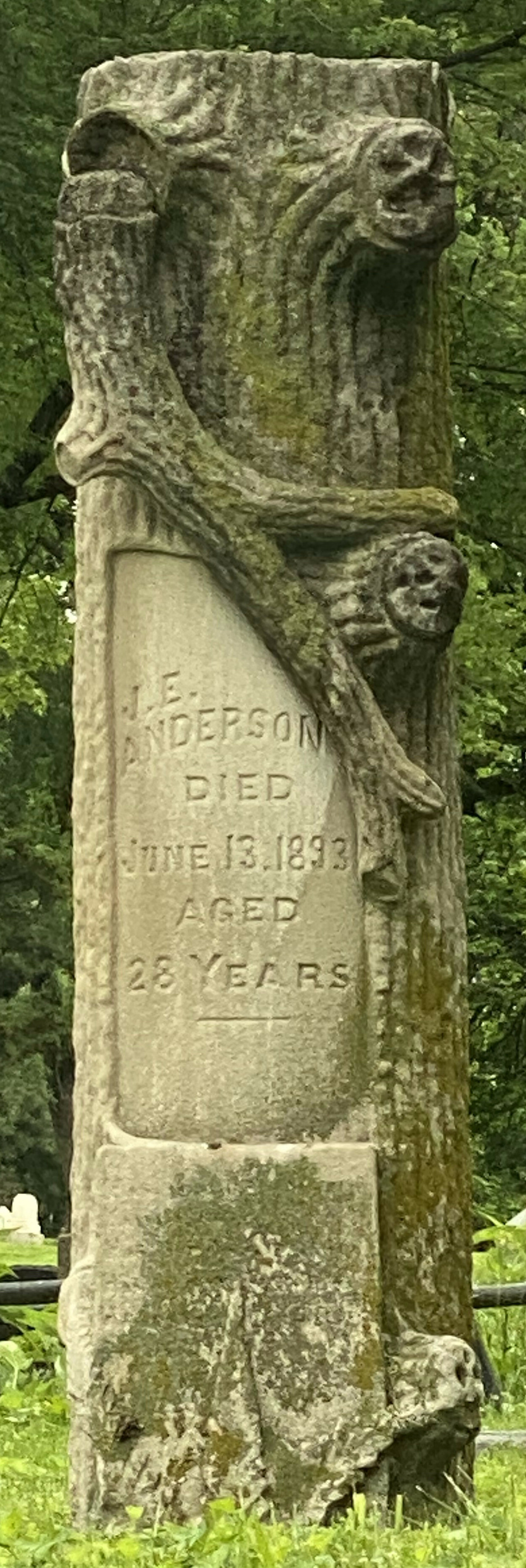
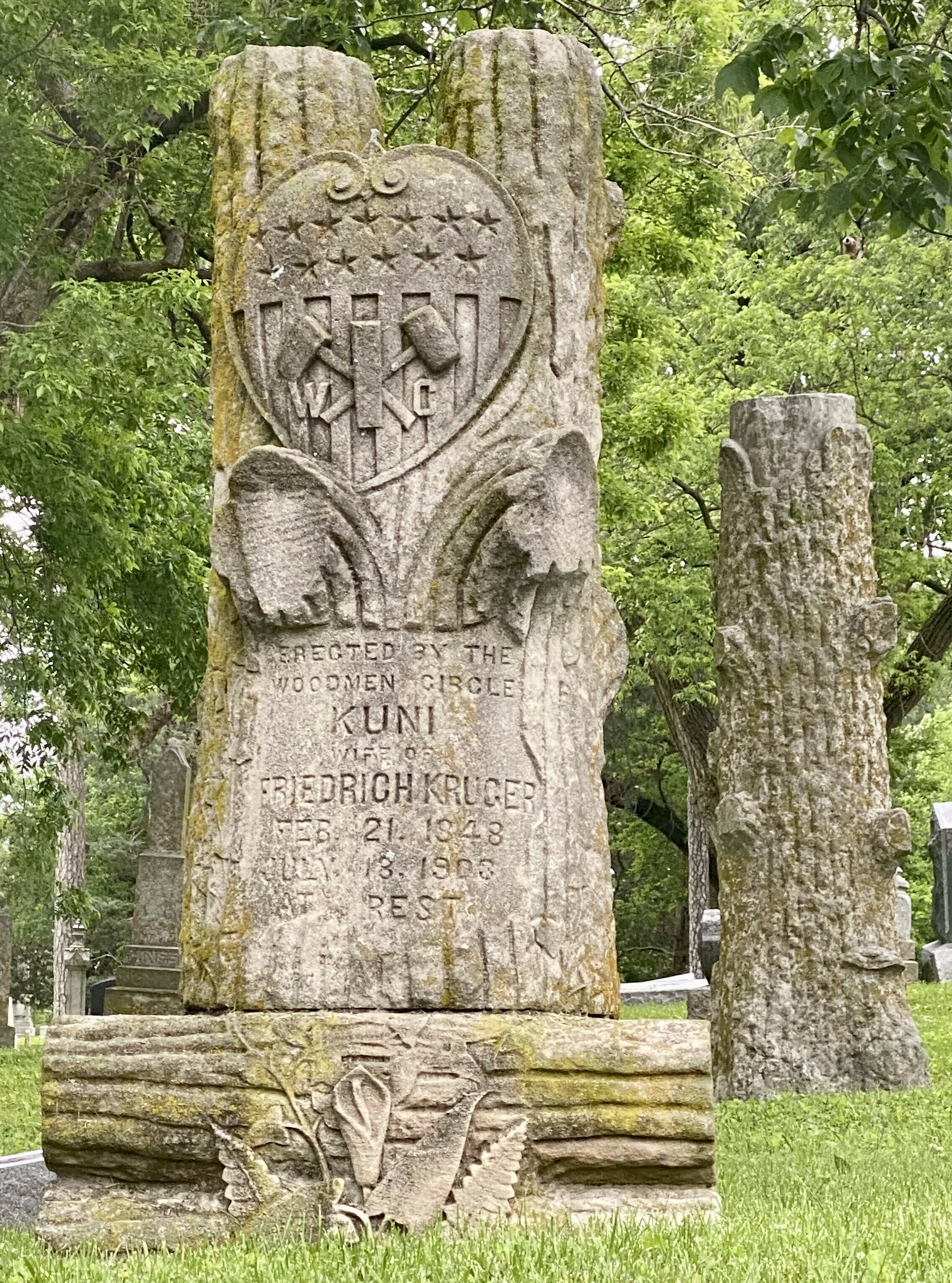
Elaborate gravestones were commissioned nationwide until 1930 by the Woodmen Circle non-profit life insurance company.
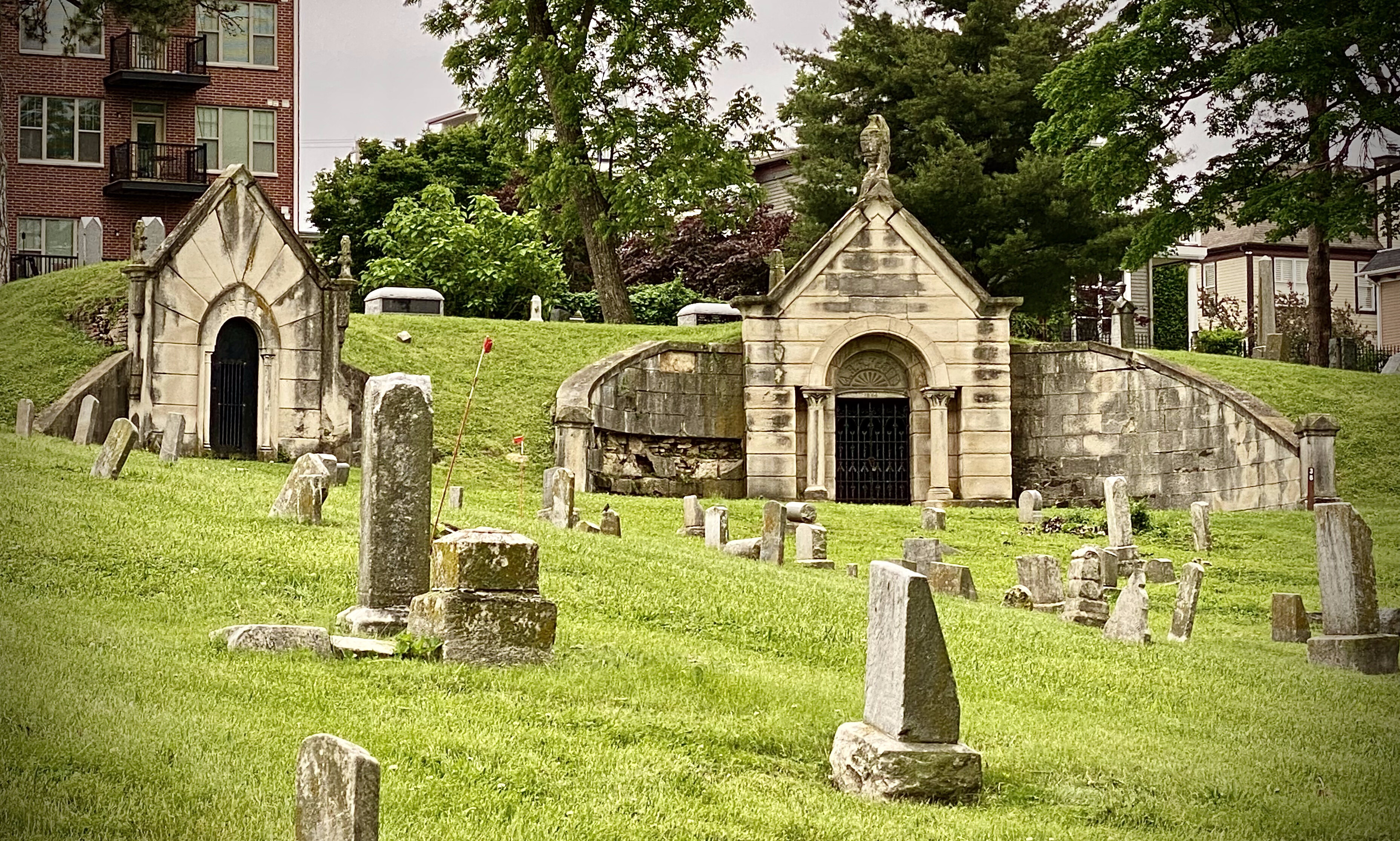

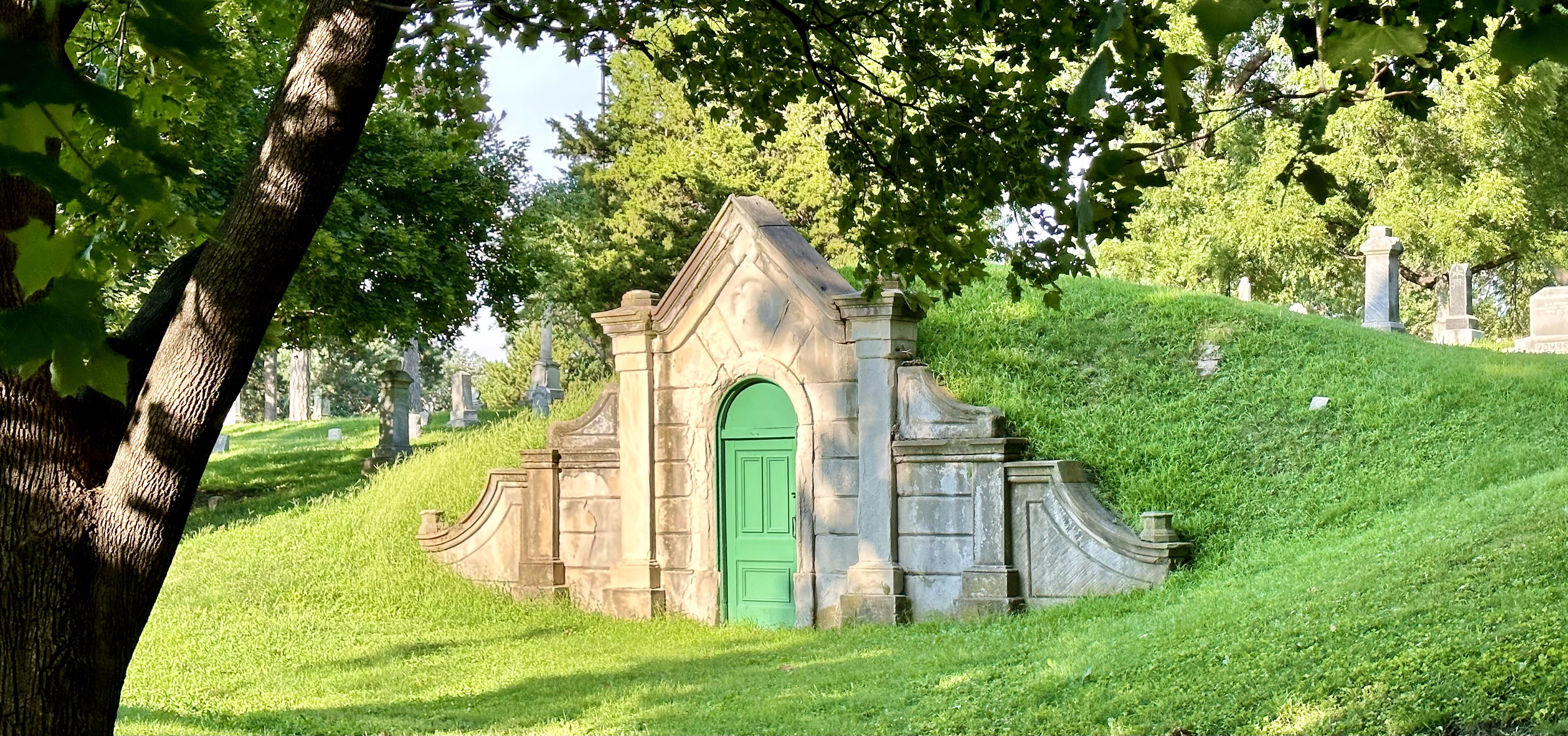
In-ground burial vaults were bought by families, and the public receiving vault holds coffins awaiting burial.

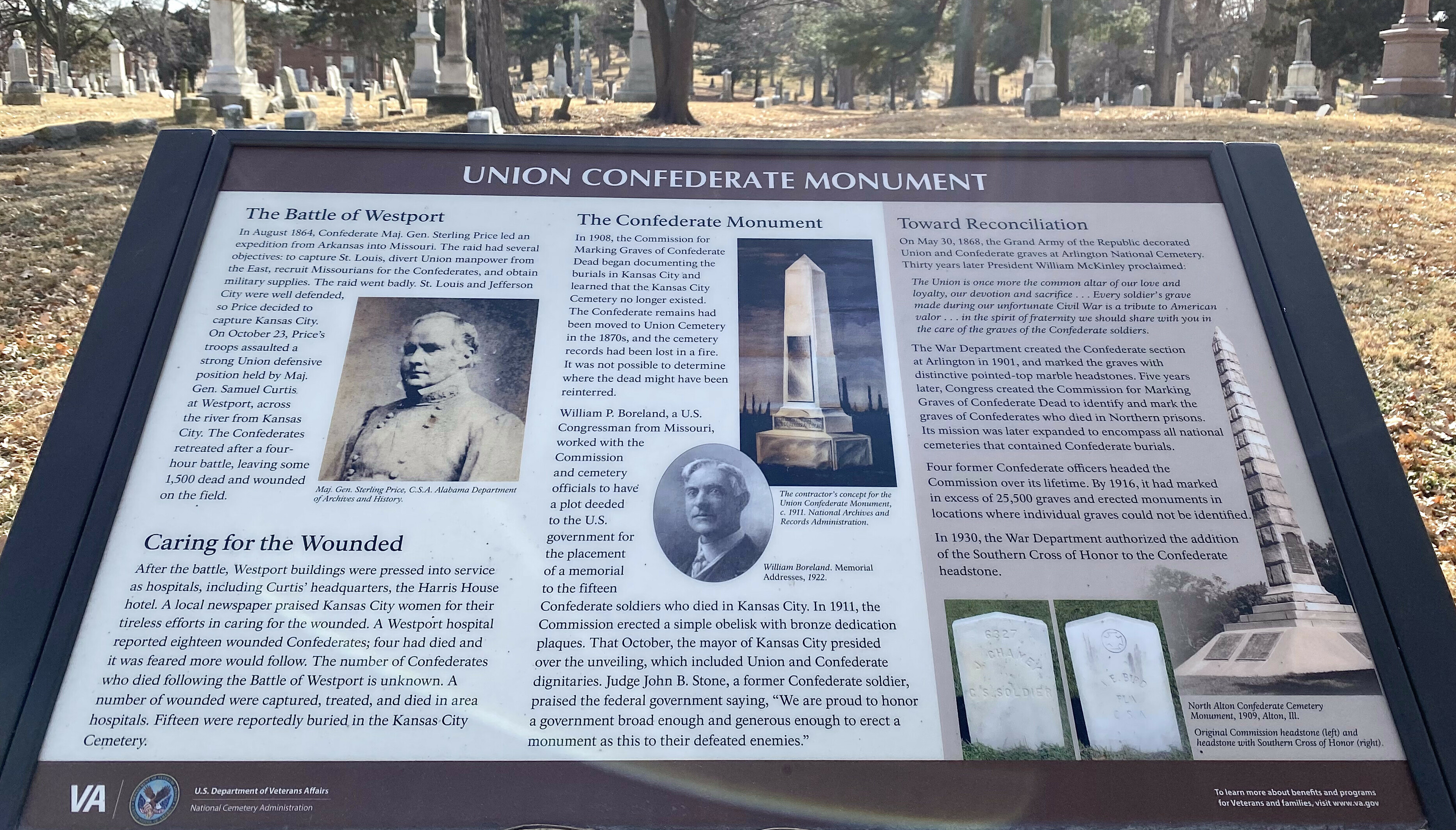
Union Confederate Monument

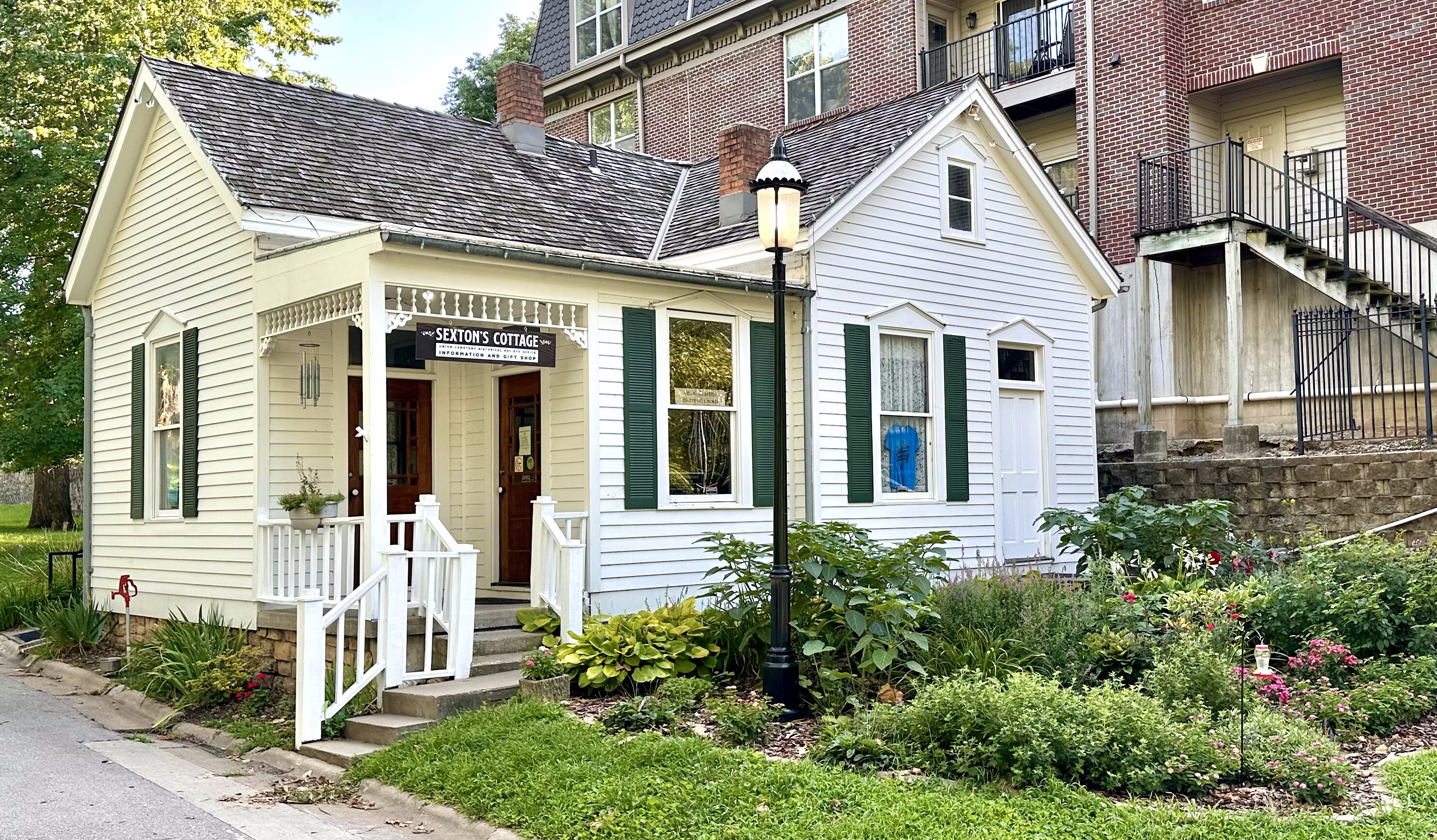
Sexton's cottage is an office and museum.

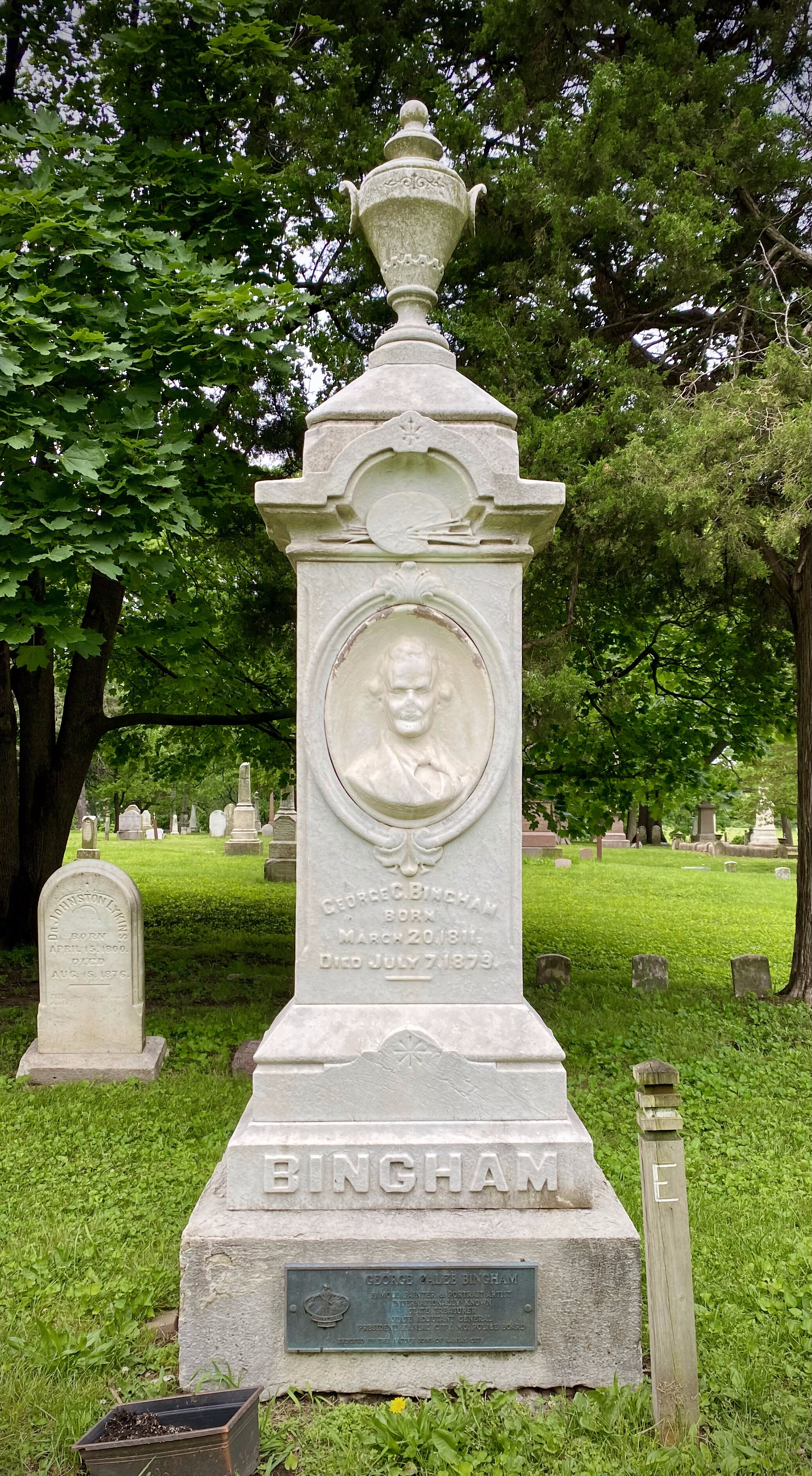
The defacement of George Caleb Bingham's gravestone forced a sweeping rehabilitation of the blighted Union Cemetery and surrounding city area, with the grave of his good friend Johnston Lykins to the left.

In the 1850s, the area had been settled by the two small boomtowns of West Port to the south and the town of Kansas 4 miles north and bordering the Missouri River. The cholera pandemic of 1849 had killed half of those towns' settlers and filled their local cemeteries, prompting the search for a new cemetery site to unify both communities for all time. On November 9, 1857, while the newly incorporated City of Kansas had a population of about 4,000, a special act of the Missouri General Assembly founded the Union Cemetery Assembly as a for-profit corporation. Its six founding owners included these: Milton J. Payne, then a wealthy land owner, accomplished civic developer, and the fourth mayor of Kansas City in his third of six annual terms; and James M. Hunter, a farmer and Westport merchant.

Hunter deeded 49 acres (20 ha) of his farmland to the corporation. It was bounded by Main and Oak streets, and by 27th and 30th streets. This was reportedly two squares of "rolling, brushy land on the east side of the new Westport turnpike [... with] vested privileges [protecting] it from all encroachments for streets, for railways, and other purposes", intended so even if Kansas City might swallow the cemetery by expanding south to Westport in the unforeseeable future.

On October 19, 1873 – sixteen years after founding, and one year after the founding of Elmwood Cemetery – the Kansas City Times published a picturesque overview of this "City of the Dead", then located less than one mile south of the expanding Kansas City. It said, "The company devotes every dollar realized [...] to improvement of the grounds, and have thus far never realized one dollar of benefit from it; the labor alone [...] is more than double the income or receipts [and so] there will be no more delightful place in the West". The association's board of directors included President Milton Payne, Secretary and Treasurer W. R. Bernard, and Superintendent William Todd. Payne held two-fifths of the stock, and the rest were held by heirs, reportedly constantly funding the recent replacement of wild brush with constant landscaping, road building, and beautification. The association reportedly intended the cemetery to become one of the "most attractive resorts to be found near this city" for rich and poor alike, with miniature lakes, cool springs, hourly streetcar, walking paths, and roads. A nominal fee for burial plots funded the damming of several living springs from north to south, to create cascades and lakes including water lilies. A new US$3,000 (equivalent to about $81,000 in 2025) public receiving vault was constructed for temporary storage of up to 40 coffins awaiting burial arrangements. Plans included removal of old fashioned wooden grave pens that rotted and promote weeds. Two recent additions totaled 49 acres (20 ha).

In August 1889, the cemetery sexton's cottage burned, including the major loss of all historical burial records, leaving hundreds of weathered wooden and limestone grave markers unidentifiable.

By 1910, after decades of virtually no maintenance, the cemetery's condition and the association's reputation had degraded to "a public disgrace". Kansas City's boom then neighbored the cemetery with major new development including Union Station, creating press about the cemetery's conditions. Political leaders decried the decrepit cemetery as "the most narrow and obstructive institution the city has to contend with" in building better roads, especially as alternates to the steep Main Street. The association raised maintenance funds by selling the northwest 19 acres (7.7 ha) at 27th and Main Streets where graves reportedly lay. Past decades of newspaper coverage about the cemetery's deterioration was then accentuated by more lawsuits discovering a long history of haphazard mass graves. In 1911, city counselor H. S. Conrad displayed in court "a sackful of bones – those of men, women, children, picked up at random in a walk through the cemetery". The "unsanitary" conditions included broken coffins, stagnant water, thick brush, uncut weeds, and toppled headstones.

In 1916, the association's shareholders formed another for-profit corporation, the Evergreen Land Co., which used a $20,000 (equivalent to $592,000 in 2025) loan from the Fidelity National Bank and Trust Co. (which also held shares in the cemetery), to buy that 19 acres of northwest land and sell most of it for $600,000 (equivalent to $17,752,000 in 2025), eventually becoming Warwick Trafficway and the White Motor Truck Co. The cemetery's owners had essentially sold part of the cemetery to themselves. In 1924, a lawsuit by bereaved families including descendants of Kansas City's pioneers accused the association of "collusion, fraud, and conspiracy" while violating its charter of dedicated land purpose. The judge acquitted Evergreen, under advice to donate money toward an endowment fund for maintenance, so its $50,000 (equivalent to $939,000 in 2025) contribution brought the association's balance to $80,000 (equivalent to $1,503,000 in 2025) which was stricken by the Great Depression of the 1930s.

Beginning in 1922, a years-long movement among bereaved families was inspired by a speech from Kansas City Star art critic Howard E. Huselton. Aggrieved by the sunken and toppled graves, and 9-foot-tall (2.7 m) weeds, he said, "While we are on the verge of erecting a great Liberty Memorial to the boys who died in France, nearby, eight hundred out of one thousand graves of Civil War veterans lie unmarked."

In 1928, the association's new board of directors included preservationists and descendants of city settlers, such as former plaintiff Nellie McGee Nelson. In 1936, the association voted to deed the cemetery to the city, which in 1937 turned it into a public park. The Union Cemetery Historical Society was founded in 1984 as a non-profit corporation to steward the onsite historical museum and historical records located in the sexton's cottage, maintain much of the grounds and the graves, and to conduct tours, with Kansas City Parks & Recreation department as groundskeeper. The Society's volunteer framework aids in digitizing the historical records of the estimated 55,000 bodies. Many permanently unidentifiable markers or unmarked mass graves remain, especially in the northwest potter's field. Stories of old grave robberies and hauntings continue, and groups visit around Halloween. Gravestones were reconditioned in 2024.

== Notable burials ==
- George Caleb Bingham (1811–1879), American painter
- Joseph Boggs (1749–1843), American Army officer, moved from the Old Westport Cemetery in 1965
- Johnston Lykins (1800–1876), tribal missionary, co-founder and first legal mayor of the Town of Kansas, and lifelong civic booster of Kansas City
- John Calvin McCoy (1811–1889), founder of Westport
- Alexander Majors (1814–1900), co-founder of the Pony Express
- Milton J. Payne (1829–1900), founding co-owner of Union Cemetery, fourth mayor of KC totaling six annual terms, and civic entrepreneur

== See also ==
- Elmwood Cemetery, another historical site and reinterment destination from Union Cemetery
- Arlington National Cemetery mismanagement controversy
