= Robert Wilson (Missouri politician) =

American lawyer and politician (1803–1870)

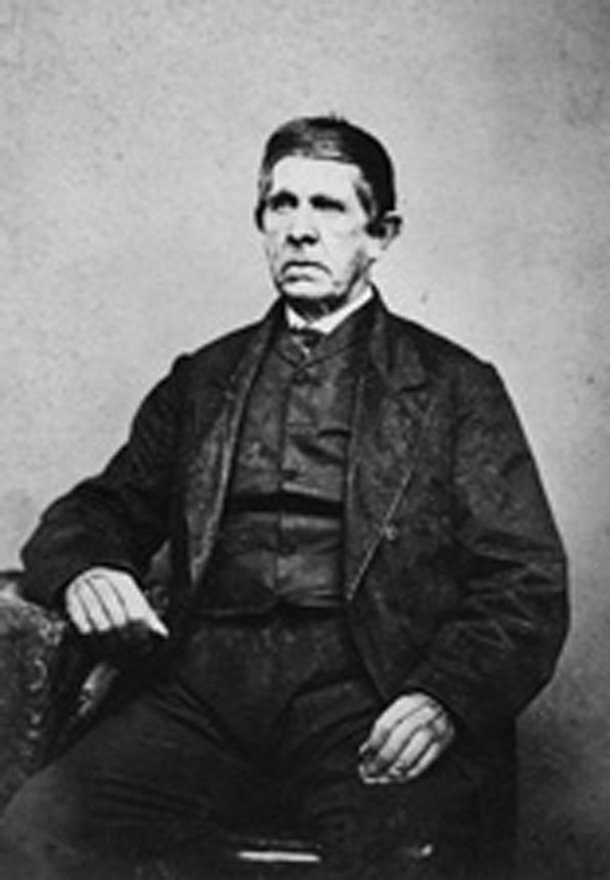

United States Senator from Missouri
- In office January 17, 1862 – November 13, 1863
- Appointed by: Hamilton Rowan Gamble
- Preceded by: Waldo P. Johnson
- Succeeded by: B. Gratz Brown

Member of the Missouri Senate
- In office 1854

Member of the Missouri House of Representatives
- In office 1844

Personal details
- Born: November 1803 Staunton, Virginia, U.S.
- Died: May 10, 1870 (aged 66) Marshall, Missouri, U.S.
- Party: Union
- Occupation: Politician, lawyer

Military service
- Branch/service: Missouri Militia
- Rank: Brigadier General
- Battles/wars: Mormon War

Robert Wilson (November 1803 – May 10, 1870) was an American lawyer and politician. A member of the Union Party, he was a member of the United States Senate from Missouri.

== Biography ==
Wilson's birth date and place are disputed. He was either born in November 1803 or on November 6, 1800, in either Staunton or Abingdon, Virginia. In 1820, he moved to Howard County, Missouri. He worked as an educator, later becoming Howard County's probate judge in 1825 and serving as a court clerk between 1829 and 1840. In 1837, he was a brigadier-general in the Missouri State Defense Force, in which he commanded troops in the 1838 Mormon War. In 1840, he was admitted to the bar, after which he practiced law in Huntsville. In 1852, he moved to Andrew County. He owned slaves.

Wilson was a member of the Union Party, a pro-slavery Unionist political party, though aligned with the Whig Party. He served in the Missouri House of Representatives in 1844, and in the Missouri Senate in 1854. He participated in the 1861 Missouri State Political Convention, where politicians debated whether to secede from the Union. In the Convention, he served as vice president and later as acting president after Sterling Price retired from the position.

Following the expulsion of Waldo P. Johnson from the United States Senate, Wilson was appointed by Governor Hamilton Rowan Gamble to complete his unexpired term. He served from January 17, 1862, to November 13, 1863. On July 12, 1862, he was among the Missouri Congressmen who refused to abolish slavery in the state by request of President Abraham Lincoln. He was a member of the United States Senate Committee on the Pacific Railroad. In 1866, he participated in a "National Union Convention" in Philadelphia.

Following his career in politics, Wilson worked as a farmer in St. Joseph. In 1826, he married Mrs. Snoddy, with whom he had six children. He died on May 10, 1870, aged 66, in Marshall, Missouri, and is buried in Mount Mora Cemetery.

== See also ==
- Third-party and independent members of the United States Congress

U.S. Senate
Preceded by Waldo P. Johnson	U.S. senator (Class 3) from Missouri; January 17, 1862 – November 13, 1863; Served alongside: John B. Henderson	Succeeded by B. Gratz Brown
