= Forest Hill Calvary Cemetery =

Cemetery in Kansas City, Missouri

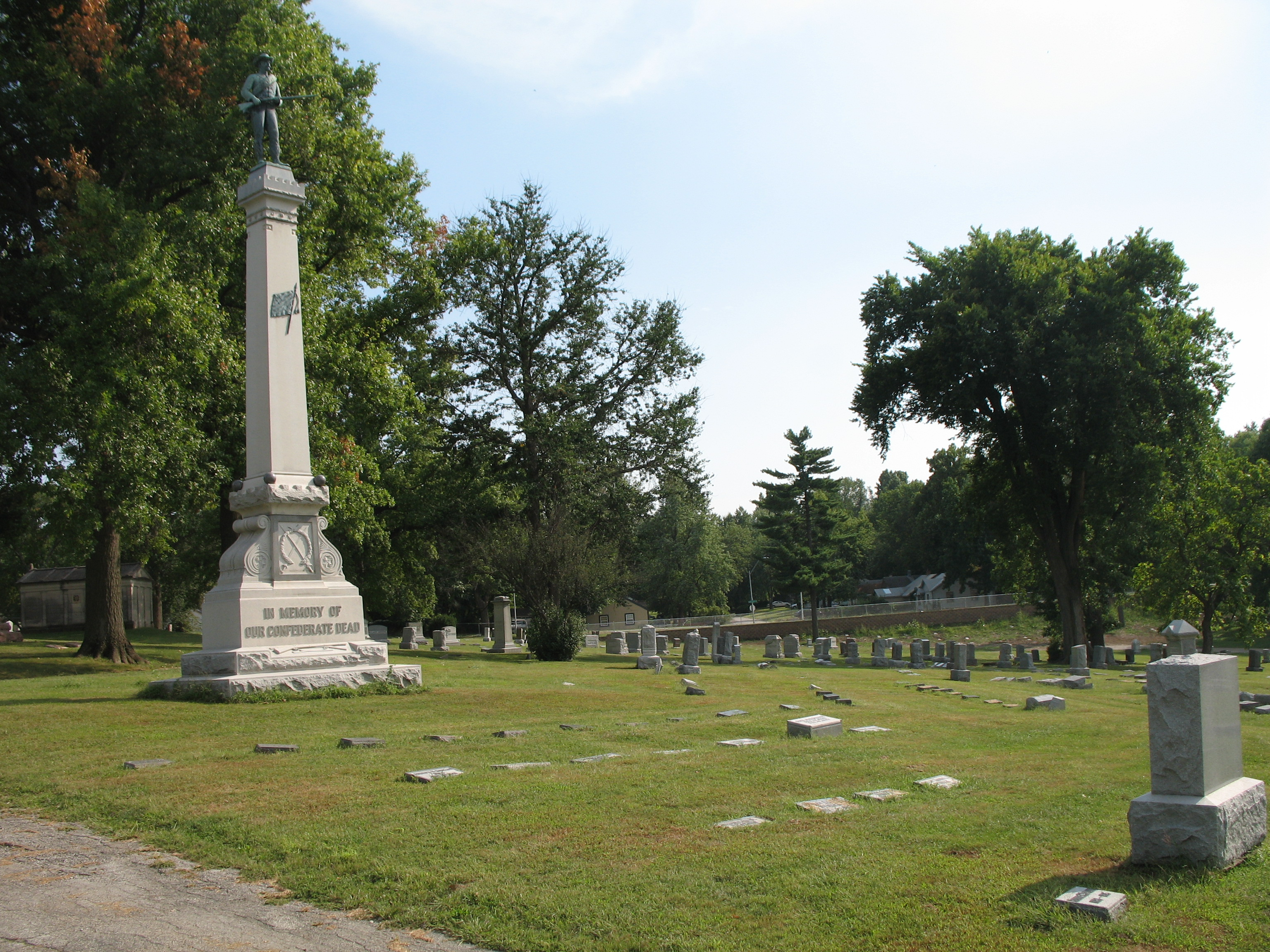
- Interactive map of Forest Hill Calvary Cemetery

Details
- Established: 1888
- Location: 6901 Troost Avenue; Kansas City, Missouri
- Country: United States
- Coordinates: 39°00′08″N 94°34′14″W
- Size: 160 acres (65 ha)
- Website: https://www.fhccemetery.com/

Forest Hill Calvary Cemetery is a cemetery in Kansas City, Missouri.

== History ==
The Forest Hill Calvary Cemetery was established in 1888. George Kessler served as the landscape architect when the cemetery was established.

The cemetery is approximately 160 acres (65 ha). It is located at 69th Street and Troost Avenue.

== Notable burials ==
- Edward Robert Atwill (1840–1911), bishop of Episcopal Diocese of West Missouri
- Charles A. Baird (1870–1944), athletic director at the University of Michigan
- John L. Barkley (1895–1966), U.S. Medal of Honor recipient
- Harold Roe Bartle (1901–1974), businessman, philanthropist, executive, mayor of Kansas City, Missouri, namesake of Kansas City Chiefs
- Albert I. Beach (1883–1939), mayor of Kansas City, Missouri
- Joseph Boggs (1749–1843), army officer, moved from Old Westport Cemetery in 1915
- Daniel Boone III (1809–1880), and Mary Constance Philibert Boone (1814–1904), early Kansas City founders who settled in the area that later became Forest Hill Cemetery
- Louis C. Boyle (1866–1925), Kansas Attorney General and lawyer
- Walter Halben Butler (1852–1931), U.S. Representative from Iowa, newspaperman and lawyer
- Arthur Chapman (1863–1928), member of the Missouri House of Representatives
- Laurie Perry Cookingham (1896–1992), city manager of multiple cities, including Kansas City, Missouri and Fort Worth, Texas
- Thomas T. Crittenden (1832–1909), Governor of Missouri
- Thomas T. Crittenden Jr. (1863–1938), mayor of Kansas City, Missouri
- Jesse M. Donaldson (1885–1970), U.S. Postmaster General
- Tatiana Dokoudovska (1921–2005), French ballet dancer
- Bobby Greenlease (1947–1953), six-year-old kidnapping and homicide victim
- J. C. Hall (1891–1982), founder and chief executive of Hallmark Cards
- Sid J. Hare (1860–1938), landscape architect
- John L. Harrington (1868–1942), civil engineer and bridge designer
- Waldo P. Johnson (1817–1885), Confederate States and U.S. Senator from Missouri
- William Tell Johnson (1848–1930), American lawyer and judge
- William Thornton Kemper Sr. (1867–1938), Kansas City banker
- Bertha Mae Lillenas (1889–1945), evangelist and hymn writer
- Robert A. Long (1850–1934), American lumber baron, developer, investor, newspaper owner, and philanthropist
- Homer B. Mann (1869–1950), president of Park College, insurance businessman and state politician
- Jay H. Neff (1854–1915), mayor of Kansas City, Missouri and newspaperman
- J. C. Nichols (1880–1950), real estate developer
- Buck O'Neil (1911-2006), first baseman and manager in the Negro American League, first African American coach in Major League Baseball, played a major role in establishing the Negro Leagues Baseball Museum, member of the National Baseball Hall of Fame
- Satchel Paige (1906–1982), American baseball player in Negro league and Major League Baseball, member of the National Baseball Hall of Fame
- Sidney Catlin Partridge (1857–1930), bishop of Kyoto, bishop of Episcopal Diocese of West Missouri
- Joseph M. Patterson (1837–1914), member of the Illinois Senate
- Tom Pendergast (1872–1945), Political boss in Kansas City from 1925 to 1939
- Mason S. Peters (1844–1914), U.S. Representative from Kansas
- Charles H. Price II (1931–2012), businessman and U.S. ambassador to the United Kingdom and Belgium
- John H. Ricksecker (1843–1929), Civil War Medal of Honor recipient
- Frank P. Sebree (1854–1940), lawyer and member of the Missouri House of Representatives
- Joe Shannon (1867–1943), U.S. Representative from Missouri and Democratic political boss
- Joseph O. Shelby (1830–1897), Confederate States Army general
- George M. Shelley (1850–1929), Mayor of Kansas City
- Kate Spade, fashion designer and entrepreneur, she was the co-founder and co-owner of the designer brand Kate Spade New York
- Kenneth A. Spencer (1902–1960), coal miner and philanthropist
- Robert Nelson Spencer (1877–1961), bishop of Episcopal Diocese of West Missouri
- Carrie Westlake Whitney (1854–1934), librarian and first director of Kansas City Public Library
- Hazel Browne Williams (1907–1986), educator at the University of Missouri–Kansas City

== See also ==
- List of cemeteries in Missouri
