= 100 Greatest African Americans =

Book by Molefi Kete Asante

100 Greatest African Americans: A Biographical Encyclopedia
- Author: Molefi Kete Asante
- Language: English
- Subject: African-American biographies
- Published: 2002
- Publisher: Prometheus Books
- Publication place: United States
- Media type: Print
- Pages: 345
- ISBN: 978-1573929639

100 Greatest African Americans is a biographical dictionary of one hundred historically great Black Americans (in alphabetical order; that is, they are not ranked), as assessed by Temple University professor Molefi Kete Asante in 2002. A similar book was written by Columbus Salley. First published in 1992, Salley's book is titled The Black 100: A Ranking of the Most Influential African-Americans, Past and Present.

== Criteria ==
Asante used five factors in establishing the list:

- "significance in the general progress of African-Americans toward full equality in the American social and political system"
- "self-sacrifice and a willingness to take great risks for the collective good"
- "unusual will and determination in the face of great danger and against the most stubborn odds"
- "a consistent posture toward raising the social, cultural and economic status of African Americans"
- "personal achievement that reveals the best qualities of the African American people"

Reference and User Services Quarterly reviewed the list positively in 2003, while noting the subjectivity in judging greatness, particularly for contemporary individuals. A review in Booklist that same year states that Asante "makes it very clear that he left out numerous current popular people because he feels the hype around the pop persona is not what makes an individual important ... Each portrait covers two to four pages that summarize the person’s life, work, and importance and is accompanied by a black-and-white photograph or illustration."

== List ==
The list in alphabetical order, as published in Asante's 2002 book:

1. Hank Aaron (1934–2021)
2. Ira Aldridge (1807–1867)
3. Muhammad Ali (1942–2016)
4. Richard Allen (1760–1831)
5. Marian Anderson (1897–1993)
6. Maya Angelou (1928–2014)
7. Arthur Ashe (1943–1993)
8. Crispus Attucks (1723–1770)
9. James Baldwin (1924–1987)
10. Benjamin Banneker (1731–1806)
11. Amiri Baraka (1934–2014)
12. Romare Bearden (1911–1988)
13. Mary McLeod Bethune (1875–1955)
14. Guion Bluford (born 1942)
15. Arna Bontemps (1902–1973)
16. Edward W. Brooke (1919–2015)
17. Gwendolyn Brooks (1917–2000)
18. Blanche K. Bruce (1841–1898)
19. Ralph Bunche (1903–1971)
20. George Washington Carver (1864–1943)
21. Shirley Chisholm (1924–2005)
22. Kenneth B. Clark (1914–2005)
23. John Henrik Clarke (1915–1998)
24. John Coltrane (1926–1967)
25. Bill Cosby (born 1937)
26. Alexander Crummell (1819–1898)
27. Countee Cullen (1903–1946)
28. Benjamin O. Davis Jr. (1912–2002)
29. Martin R. Delany (1812–1885)
30. Frederick Douglass (1817–1895)
31. Charles Drew (1904–1950)
32. W. E. B. Du Bois (1868–1963)
33. Paul Laurence Dunbar (1872–1906)
34. Katherine Dunham (1909–2006)
35. Duke Ellington (1899–1974)
36. James Forten (1766–1842)
37. John Hope Franklin (1915–2009)
38. Henry Highland Garnet (1815–1882)
39. Marcus Garvey (1887–1940)
40. Prince Hall (1735–1807)
41. Fannie Lou Hamer (1917–1977)
42. Lorraine Hansberry (1930–1965)
43. Dorothy Height (1912–2010)
44. Matthew Henson (1866–1955)
45. Charles Hamilton Houston (1895–1950)
46. Langston Hughes (1901–1967)
47. Zora Neale Hurston (1891–1960)
48. Jesse Jackson (1941–2026)
49. Mae Jemison (born 1956)
50. Jack Johnson (1878–1946)
51. James Weldon Johnson (1871–1938)
52. John H. Johnson (1918–2005)
53. Percy Julian (1899–1975)
54. Ernest Just (1883–1941)
55. Maulana Karenga (born 1941)
56. Martin Luther King Jr. (1929–1968)
57. Edmonia Lewis (1844–1907)
58. Alain Locke (1885–1954)
59. Joe Louis (1914–1981)
60. Thurgood Marshall (1908–1993)
61. Benjamin E. Mays (1894–1984)
62. Elijah McCoy (1844–1929)
63. Claude McKay (1890–1948)
64. Oscar Micheaux (1884–1951)
65. Dorie Miller (1919–1943)
66. Garrett Morgan (1877–1963)
67. Toni Morrison (1931–2019)
68. Elijah Muhammad (1897–1975)
69. Jesse Owens (1913–1980)
70. Rosa Parks (1913–2005)
71. Adam Clayton Powell Jr. (1908–1972)
72. Colin Powell (1937–2021)
73. A. Philip Randolph (1889–1979)
74. Hiram Revels (1827–1901)
75. Paul Robeson (1898–1978)
76. Jackie Robinson (1919–1972)
77. John Russwurm (1799–1851)
78. Arturo Schomburg (1874–1938)
79. Benjamin "Pop" Singleton (1809–1900)
80. Mary Church Terrell (1863–1954)
81. William Monroe Trotter (1872–1934)
82. Sojourner Truth (c. 1797–1883)
83. Harriet Tubman (1822–1913)
84. Kwame Ture (1941–1998)
85. Henry McNeal Turner (1834–1915)
86. Nat Turner (1800–1831)
87. David Walker (1796–1830)
88. Madame C. J. Walker (1867–1919)
89. Booker T. Washington (1856–1915)
90. Ida B. Wells-Barnett (1862–1931)
91. Phillis Wheatley (c. 1753–1784)
92. Walter F. White (1893–1955)
93. Roy Wilkins (1901–1981)
94. Daniel Hale Williams (1856–1931)
95. August Wilson (1945–2005)
96. Oprah Winfrey (born 1954)
97. Tiger Woods (born 1975)
98. Carter G. Woodson (1875–1950)
99. Richard Wright (1908–1960)
100. Malcolm X (1925–1965)

== See also ==
- Lists of African Americans
