= Louisville Municipal College =

Historically Black college in Kentucky, US

- Former names: Louisville Municipal College for Negros
- Type: Private
- Active: 1931–1951
- Parent institution: University of Louisville
- Location: Louisville, Kentucky, United States

Louisville Municipal College was a historically black college located in Louisville, Kentucky which existed from 1931 to 1951.

== History ==
In 1920, a bond issue for funding of University of Louisville (which required a two-thirds affirmative vote) failed in part due to Negro opposition, as the bond issue would have used taxes of Negros, however University of Louisville did not allow Negros to attend. In 1925, after compromises including sharing 10% ($100 thousand of the $1 Million of the bond) proceeds with a College for Negros.

Progress on the College for Negros was delayed by the deaths of two University of Louisville Presidents while in Office: President Arthur Younger Ford (President from 1914 to 1926) and his successor, George Colvin (President from 1926 to 1928).

The school was founded on the former location of Simmons College of Kentucky. Simmons, founded in 1879 had had its location at Seventh and Kentucky foreclosed in 1930, Simmons College continued operations elsewhere in Louisville, eventually returning to the Seventh and Kentucky location in 2006.

== Deans ==
Deans of Louisville Municipal College:

- Rufus Early Clement, 1931–1937
- David A. Lane, 1937–1942
- Bertram W. Doyle, 1942–1950

In the last year before the merger, Louisville Municipal College did not have a dean.

== Student activities ==
The school newspaper was The Bantam.

=== Fraternities and Sororities ===
The college had chapters of the following National Pan-Hellenic Council Fraternities and Sororities.

- Alpha Phi Alpha - Alpha Pi chapter - May 7, 1934
- Alpha Kappa Alpha - Beta Epsilon chapter - November 6, 1933
- Kappa Alpha Psi - Alpha Omicron chapter - June 15, 1933
- Delta Sigma Theta - Xi chapter - April 15, 1922 (originally chartered at Simmons College)
- Phi Beta Sigma - Tau chapter - April 25, 1925 (originally chartered at Simmons College)
- Sigma Gamma Rho - Delta chapter - 1930s
- Zeta Phi Beta - Delta Alpha chapter - 1934

== Athletics ==
The football team was the Bantams.

Football seasons ran from at 1931 to 1949 and included 1946 and 1947.

Basketball was also played through 1950

== Notable alumni, faculty and staff ==
=== Alumni ===
- Elmer Lucille Allen - Ceramic artist and chemist
- Leon Bibb - American folk singer
- Fannie R. Givens - artist, missionary, and political activist
- Cynthia Jenkins - American librarian, community activist, and politician from New York.
- Alberta Odell Jones - African-American attorney and civil rights icon
- Georgia Davis Powers - First African American and first woman elected to the Kentucky State Senate.

=== Faculty and Staff ===
- Earl Brown - American Negro league pitcher, journalist, and politician
- Rufus Early Clement - American academic administrator and university president, first dean of LMC.
- Donald Anderson Edwards - African American physicist
- Eliza Atkins Gleason - African American librarian
- Virginia Lacy Jones -African American librarian
- Dwight T. Reed - Football coach at LMC and Lincoln University in Missouri
- Hazel Browne Williams - African American librarian
