= Union Confederate Monument =

Memorial in Kansas City, Missouri

Coordinates: 39.075966°N 94.580690°W

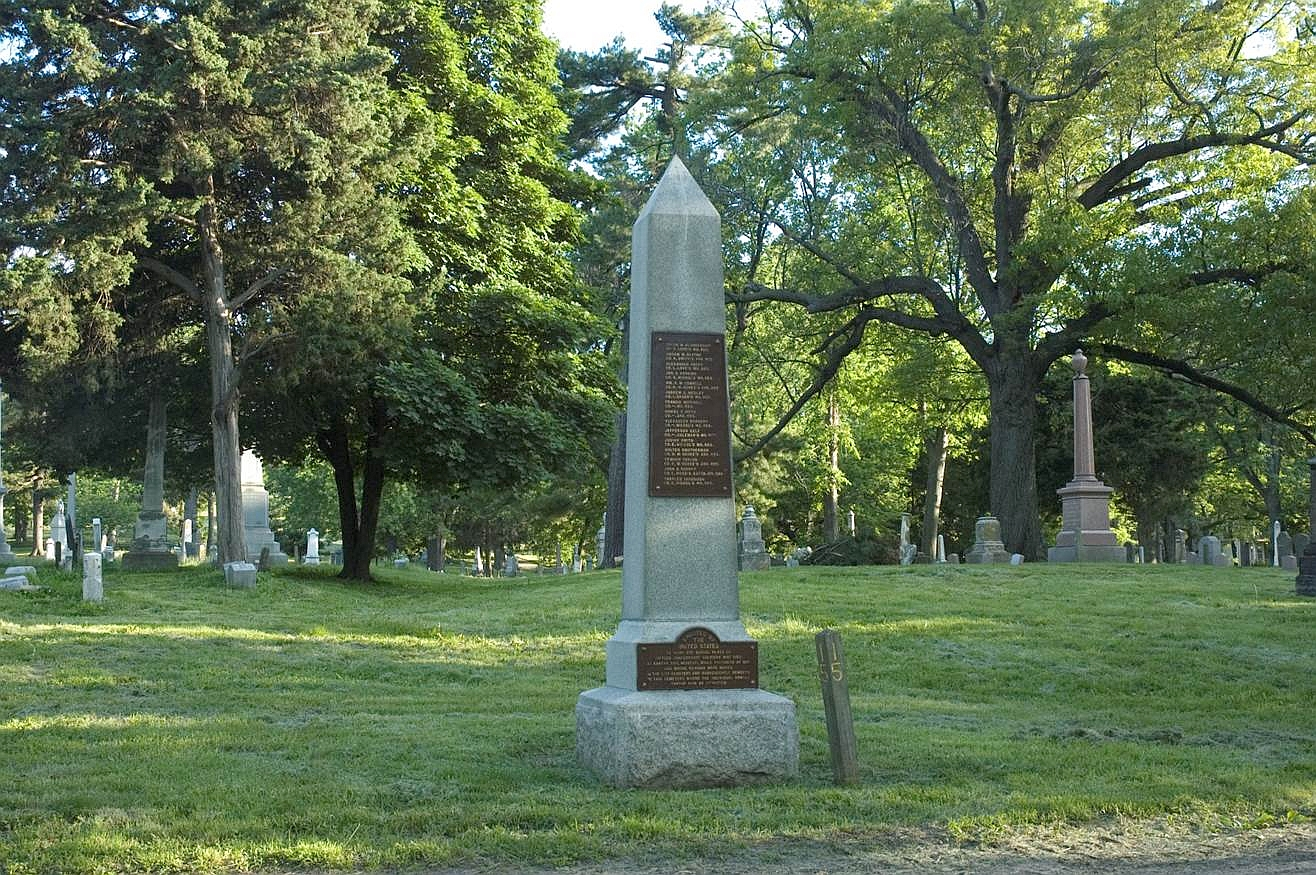
- Union Confederate Monument
- Location: Union Cemetery, Kansas City, Missouri
- Material: Granite sculpture
- Completion date: 1911

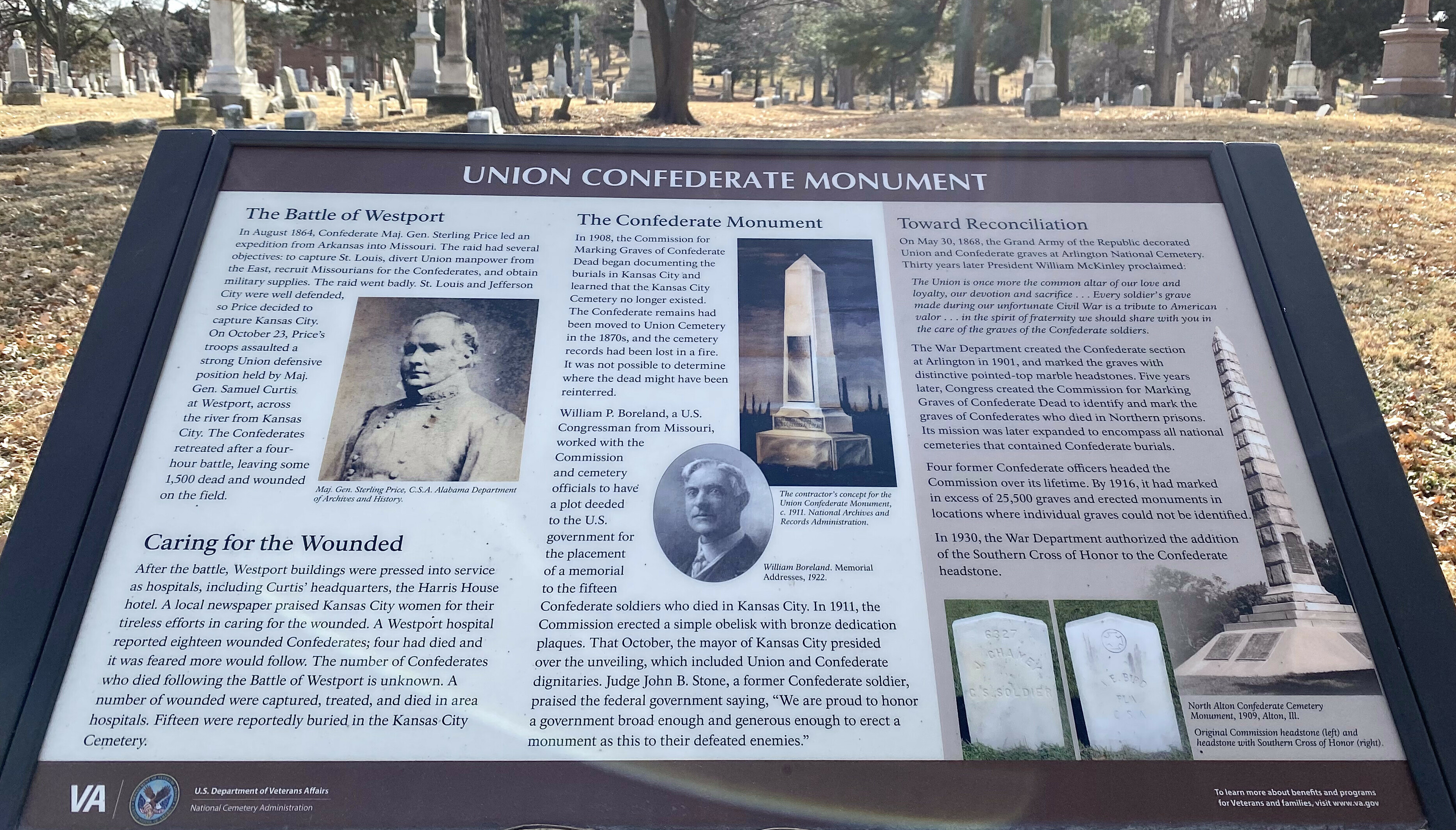
The plaque tells the story.

The Union Confederate Monument, also known as the Unknown Confederate Gravesite Monument, is an outdoor Confederate memorial at Union Cemetery in Kansas City, Missouri. The 15-foot (4.6 m) granite obelisk monument was erected by the U.S. government in 1911 to commemorate the 15 Confederate prisoners of war buried at the site. The exact location of their individual graves is unknown. The memorial includes two bronze tablets displaying the names of the prisoners, who were captured during the Battle of Westport.

== See also ==
- 1911 in art
- List of Confederate monuments and memorials
