= Old Westport Cemetery =

Cemetery in Missouri, US

Coordinates: 39°3′8″N 94°35′27″W

The Old Westport Cemetery, also known as the Yoacham Cemetery and Indian Cemetery, was a cemetery in Westport, Kansas City, Missouri.

== History ==
The Old Westport Cemetery was established in 1835, by Edmund Price. He used a 2,400-square-foot (270 sq yd) area to bury his father, merchant Edgar Price. Bodies began to be moved as other cemeteries opened, and the land was bought by the Badger Lumber Company in 1915 to build their headquarters.

== Notable burials ==
- Joseph Boggs (1749–1843), Army officer, moved to Forest Hill Calvary Cemetery in 1915, then Union Cemetery in 1965
