= Hazel Browne Williams =

American educator (1907–1986)

- Born: Hazel Browne; February 9, 1907; Kansas City, Missouri, U.S.
- Died: July 7, 1986 (aged 79)
- Resting place: Forest Hill Calvary Cemetery; Kansas City, Missouri, U.S.
- Education: University of Kansas; New York University (Ph.D.)
- Occupation: Educator
- Spouse: Claude Williams (died 1937)

Hazel Browne Williams (February 9, 1907 – July 7, 1986) was an American educator. She was the first full-time African American professor at the University of Missouri–Kansas City and the first African American awarded emeritus status there.

== Early life and education ==
Hazel Browne was born in Kansas City, Missouri, on February 9, 1907. She was the only child of John and Effie Moten Browne.

She graduated from Lincoln High School in 1923. While at Lincoln High, she served as the first woman sponsor major of the school's Reserve Officers' Training Corps (ROTC).

Williams studied English at the University of Kansas and was elected to the Phi Beta Kappa academic honor society. She earned her bachelor's degree in 1927, and continued at the university to earn a master's degree in English in 1929. Her master's thesis was titled "The Difficulty of the King James Version of the Bible for the Modern Reader." Williams would later go on to earn another master's degree in guidance counseling from Columbia University, where she was elected to the honor society Kappa Delta Pi. She was the first recipient of foreign fellowships awarded by Alpha Kappa Alpha; she studied for a doctorate in Germany until her work was disrupted by the outbreak of World War II. Williams received her Ph.D. from New York University in 1953; her doctoral thesis was titled "A Semantic Study of Some Current Pejoratively Regarded Language Symbols Involving Negroes in the United States: An Approach to Intergroup Conflict Through a Study of Language Behavior".

Early in her career she married Claude Williams, a principal at Leeds Junior High School; he died in 1937.

== Career and later life ==
Williams began her career teaching at Louisville Municipal College in 1932. She was an assistant professor of English (later assistant professor of modern languages) who also taught German and established a German Studies department at the college. She returned to Kansas City to teach in 1942. In the 1940s to early 1950s she was working as a counselor at the R. T. Coles Vocational and Junior High School, where she took leave from June 1948 until September 1951 to pursue her Ph.D. She was recognized as the first Black instructor in the Kansas City School District to hold a Ph.D.

Williams became an exchange teacher through the Fulbright Program in 1956, teaching English at a girls' secondary school in Vienna.

She was hired by the University of Missouri–Kansas City in 1958 as an associate professor of education, becoming a full professor in secondary education two years later. In this role she was the first African American full-time professor at the university. She served on the school's faculty for 18 years. Her research interests included speech patterns of young children and language development; after 1970 most of her research efforts were associated with the project "Black Educators Prior to 1954," highlighting the neglected accomplishments of Black educators. When she retired in 1976, Williams became the first African American awarded emeritus status by the University of Kansas. Her career was recognized by the University of Missouri in 1977 with the Thomas Jefferson award.

Williams died on July 7, 1986, and was buried at Forest Hill Calvary Cemetery in Kansas City, Missouri.
