= John L. Barkley =

United States Army Medal of Honor recipient

John Lewis Barkley
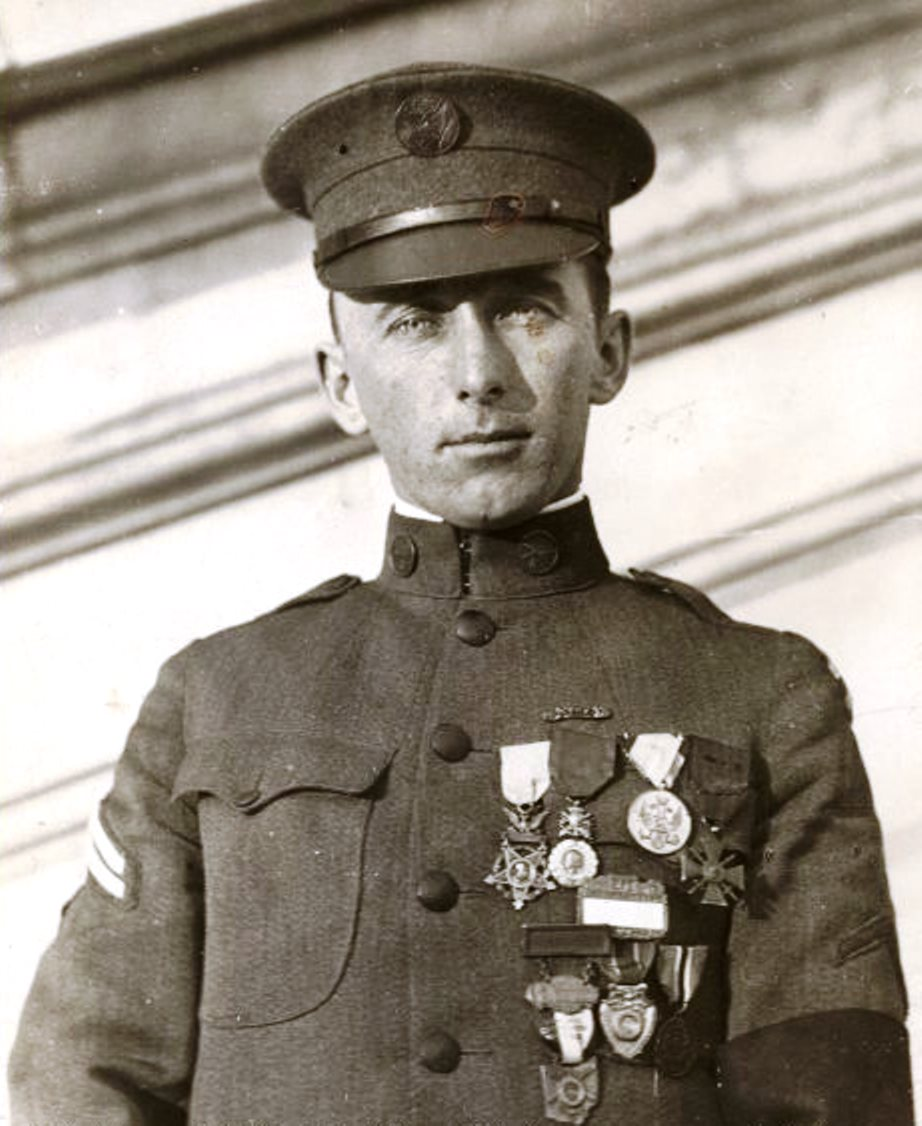
- Medal of Honor recipient
- Born: August 28, 1895; Kansas City, Missouri, U.S.
- Died: April 14, 1966 (aged 70)
- Burial place: Forest Hill Calvary Cemetery; Kansas City, Missouri, U.S.
- Military career
- Allegiance: United States of America
- Branch: United States Army
- Service years: 1917 - 1919
- Rank: Corporal
- Service number: 2214317
- Units: Company K, 4th Infantry Regiment, 3rd Division
- Conflicts: World War I Meuse Argonne Offensive
- Awards: Medal of Honor

John Lewis Barkley (August 28, 1895 – April 14, 1966) was a United States Army Medal of Honor recipient of World War I. Born in Blairstown, Missouri, near Holden, Barkley served as a Private First Class in Company K, 4th Infantry Regiment, 3rd Division. He earned the medal while fighting near Cunel, France, on October 7, 1918. His autobiography, "Scarlet Fields: The Combat Memoir of a World War I Medal of Honor Hero," details his service leading up to and following his Medal of Honor action. The book draws comparisons as the American literary response to "All Quiet on the Western Front."

Barkley died on April 14, 1966, and is buried in Forest Hill Calvary Cemetery in Kansas City, Missouri.

== Medal of Honor citation ==
Rank and organization: Private First Class, U.S. Army, Company K, 4th Infantry, 3rd Division. Place and date: At Cunel, France; October 7, 1918. Entered service at: Blairstown, Missouri. Birth: August 28, 1895; Blairstown, Missouri. General Orders: War Department, General Orders No. 44 (April 2, 1919).

Citation:

Private First Class Barkley, who was stationed in an observation post half a kilometer from the German line, on his own initiative repaired a captured enemy machinegun and mounted it in a disabled French tank near his post. Shortly afterward, when the enemy launched a counterattack against our forces, Private First Class Barkley got into the tank, waited under the hostile barrage until the enemy line was abreast of him and then opened fire, completely breaking up the counterattack and killing and wounding a large number of the enemy. Five minutes later an enemy 77-millimeter gun opened fire on the tank pointblank. One shell struck the drive wheel of the tank, but this soldier nevertheless remained in the tank and after the barrage ceased broke up a second enemy counterattack, thereby enabling our forces to gain and hold Hill 25.

== Military awards ==
Barkley's military decorations and awards include:

1st row	Medal of Honor	World War I Victory Medal w/ one silver and one bronze service star to denote credit for the Aisne, Champagne-Marne, Aisne-Marne, St. Mihiel, Meuse-Argonne and Defensive Sector battle clasps.	Médaille militaire (French Republic)
2nd row	Croix de guerre 1914–1918 with bronze palm (French Republic)	Croce al Merito di Guerra (Italy)	Medal for Military Bravery (Kingdom of Montenegro)

== See also ==
- List of Medal of Honor recipients for World War I
