= Louis C. Boyle =

American lawyer and politician (1866–1925)

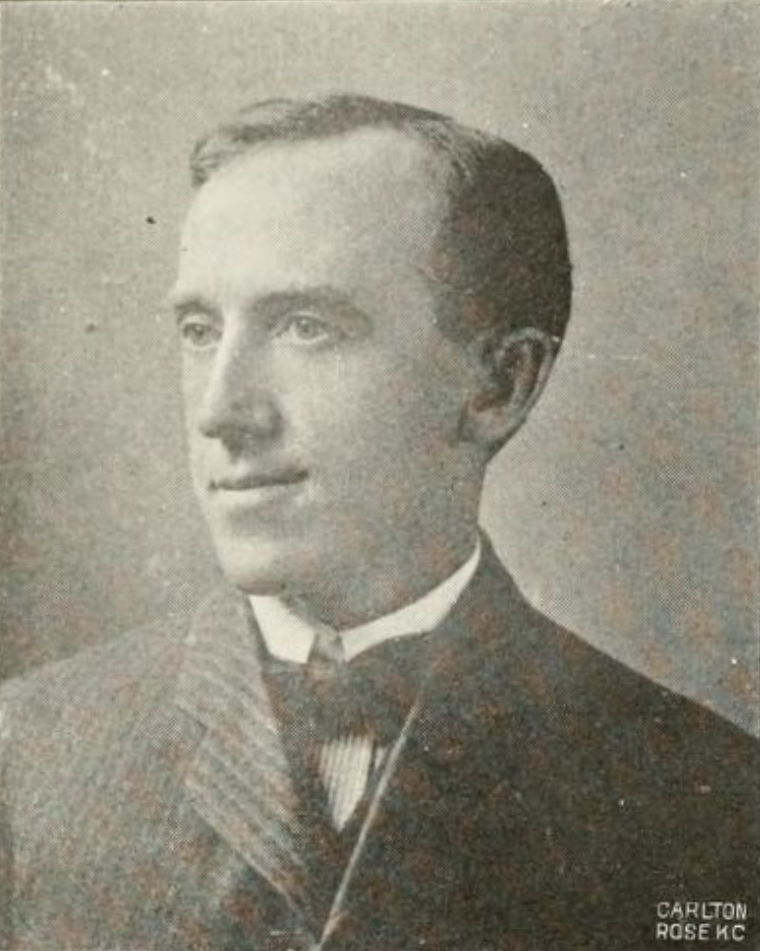
- Boyle (c. 1902)

Kansas Attorney General
- In office 1897–1899
- Preceded by: Fernando Brenton Dawes
- Succeeded by: Aretas Allen Godard

Personal details
- Born: February 26, 1866 Port Colborne, Canada
- Died: July 14, 1925 (aged 59) Rochester, Minnesota, U.S.
- Resting place: Forest Hill Calvary Cemetery; Kansas City, Missouri, U.S.
- Party: Democratic; Populist
- Spouse: Gertrude Burson
- Children: Three
- Education: University of Michigan Law School
- Occupation: Lawyer, politician

Louis C. Boyle (February 26, 1866 – July 14, 1925) was a lawyer and politician from Kansas and Missouri. He served as Kansas Attorney General from 1897 to 1899.

== Early life and education ==
Louis C. Boyle was born on February 26, 1866, in Port Colborne. At the age of eight, his family moved to Watford. He was educated in Watford before moving to Colorado at the age of fifteen to work in the mines. He studied at University of Michigan Law School in Ann Arbor, Michigan, and graduated with a degree in law in 1889. He was then admitted to the bar in Michigan.

== Career ==
After graduating, Boyle moved to Fort Scott, Kansas. Boyle was a Democrat. He was elected as prosecuting attorney of Bourbon County, Kansas. He served in that role for four years. He then returned to practicing law.

In 1896, Boyle was elected as Kansas Attorney General. He remained in the role until 1899 on a Democratic–Populist ticket.

In 1899, Boyle moved to Kansas City, Missouri. In 1903, Boyle formed a law firm with W. F. Guthrie in Fort Scott.

He also worked in Washington, D.C., for a time, supporting the legislative and legal matters for different lumber associations. In May 1923, Boyle formed the Reed, Boyle & Holmes law firm with Senator James A. Reed and Massey Holmes. It was later renamed Reed, Boyle, Holmes & Taylor and Boyle remained with the firm until his death.

== Personal life ==
Boyle married Gertrude Burson, of Garnett, Kansas, in 1890. They had three children, George, Katherine and Clara Louise.

Boyle died on July 14, 1925, at the Mayo Clinic in Rochester, Minnesota, after an operation to remove a goiter and an operation of the abdomen. He was buried at Forest Hill Calvary Cemetery in Kansas City.
