= Dunlap, Kansas =

City in Morris County, Kansas

- City
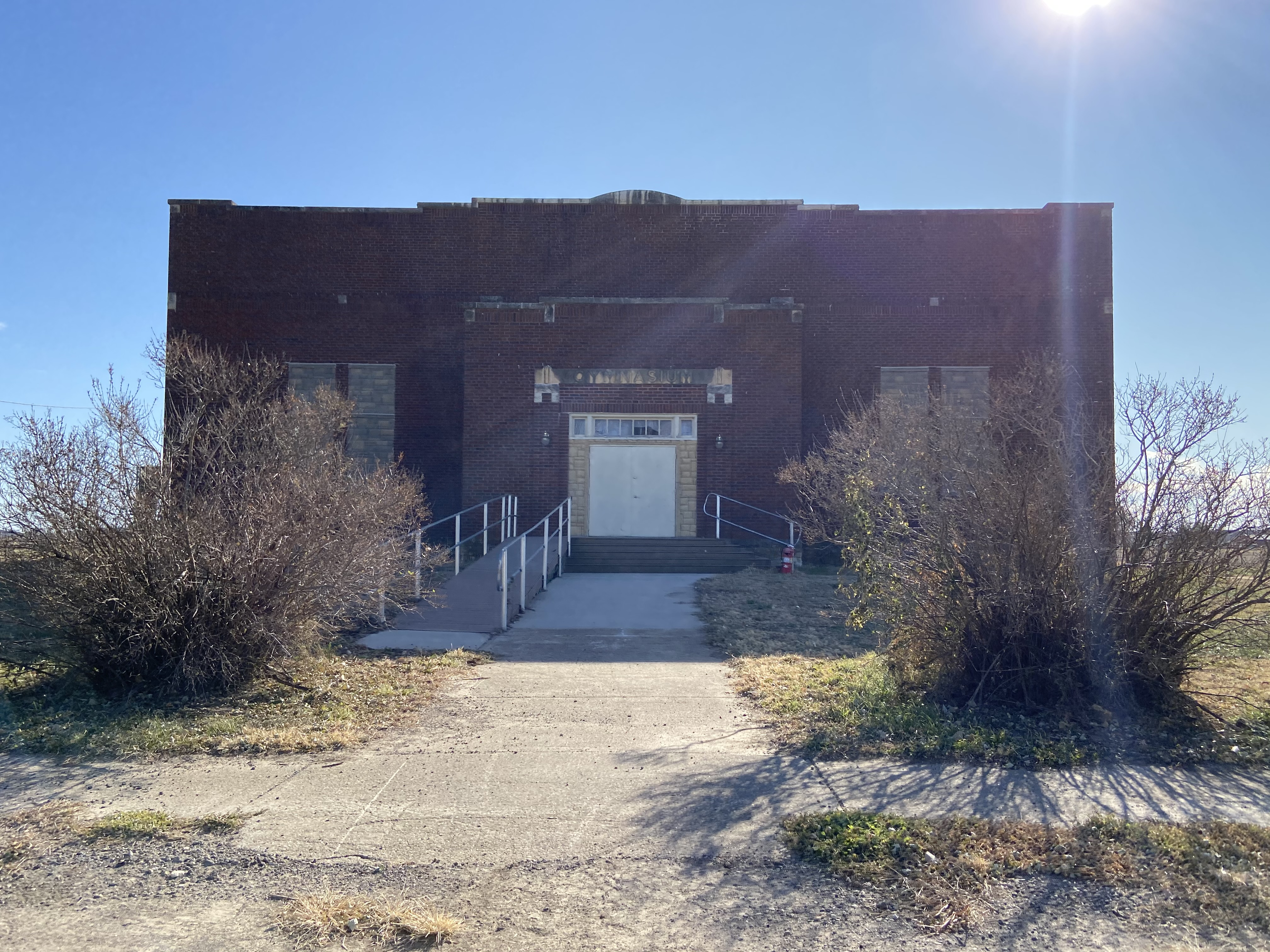
- Dunlap gymnasium on 5th Street (2019)

- Location within Morris County and Kansas

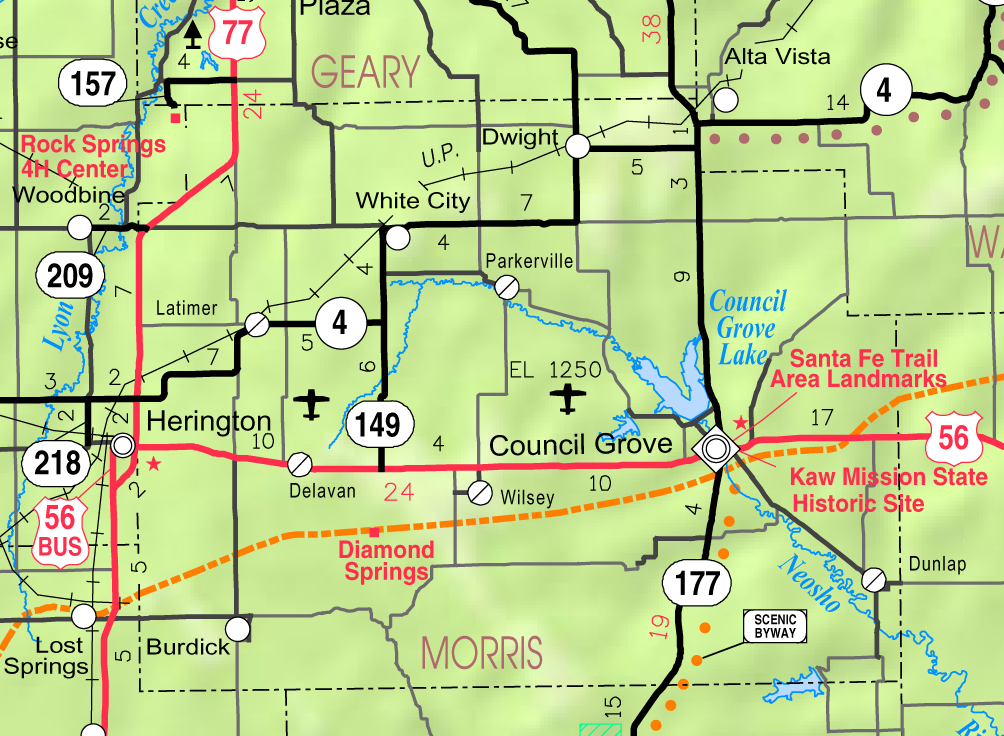
- KDOT map of Morris County (legend)
- Coordinates: 38°34′33″N 96°21′58″W
- Country: United States
- State: Kansas
- County: Morris
- Founded: 1870s
- Incorporated: 1887
- Named for: Joseph Dunlap

Government
  - Type: Mayor–Council

Area
  - Total: 0.25 sq mi (0.64 km^{2})
  - Land: 0.25 sq mi (0.64 km^{2})
  - Water: 0 sq mi (0.00 km^{2})
- Elevation: 1,188 ft (362 m)

Population (2020)
  - Total: 27
  - Density: 110/sq mi (42/km^{2})
- Time zone: UTC-6 (CST)
  - Summer (DST): UTC-5 (CDT)
- ZIP Code: 66846
- Area code: 620
- FIPS code: 20-18950
- GNIS ID: 477177

Dunlap is a city in Morris County, Kansas, United States. As of the 2020 census, the population of the city was 27.

== History ==
On March 19, 1874, a post office was established in Hillsborough, Kansas. It was later reestablished on April 20 of the same year as Dunlap, Kansas. This was named after an Indian agent representing the Kanza tribe named Joseph Gage Dunlap who had founded the town in 1869 once the Kanza tribe had migrated to Oklahoma. The town grew slowly after its founding. The town really started to take off when former slave Benjamin "Pap" Singleton came to town in the spring of 1878. Here he formed Singleton's Colony, which consisted of 200 black families. Between 1877 and 1879, hundreds followed Singleton to Kansas. These people are known as Exodusters.

After Singleton's death, the community continued to grow through the beginning of the 20th century. In 1880, the Presbyterian church's Freedmen's Academy was founded, so that African Americans could have a proper education. African-Americans in Dunlap were also restricted to their own cemetery: Dunlap Colored Cemetery.

In the 1930s the Dust Bowl also occurred. The Dust Bowl was caused by poor farming techniques and resulted in dust storms across the country. This resulted in difficulties in growing crops. Dunlap is only known as one of the many ghost towns of Kansas.

The post office closed its doors in 1988. The community is only home to roughly thirty people. Its last Black resident was buried in the colored cemetery on April 27, 1993.

=== Dunlap Colored Cemetery ===
Dunlap Colored Cemetery, also known as the Exoduster Cemetery, was nominated to the National Register of Historic Places by Janet Kimbrell and the Morris County Historical Society. Dunlap's Colored Cemetery was built in response to segregation and the prejudice against the Exoduster community. The cemetery was first established in 1880 and is now occupied with over a hundred African American graves. Dunlap's Colored Cemetery was added to the register on September 14, 2018. The cemetery was officially added for its association with the Exoduster's Movement and to "Pap" Singleton, the Father of the Exodus.

== Geography ==
Dunlap is located at 38°34′33″N 96°21′58″W (38.575818, -96.366117). According to the United States Census Bureau, the city has a total area of 0.23 square miles (0.60 km^{2}), all land. Dunlap is near the Neosho River, which has historically caused issues with flooding.

=== Climate ===
The climate in this area is characterized by hot, humid summers and generally mild to cool winters. According to the Köppen Climate Classification system, Dunlap has a humid subtropical climate, abbreviated "Cfa" on climate maps.

== Demographics ==
Historical population
Census	Pop.	Note	%±
1880	247		—
1890	408		65.2%
1900	400		−2.0%
1910	333		−16.7%
1920	300		−9.9%
1930	273		−9.0%
1940	219		−19.8%
1950	134		−38.8%
1960	134		0.0%
1970	102		−23.9%
1980	82		−19.6%
1990	65		−20.7%
2000	81		24.6%
2010	30		−63.0%
2020	27		−10.0%
U.S. Decennial Census

=== 2020 census ===
The 2020 United States census counted 27 people, 15 households, and 9 families in Dunlap. The population density was 109.8 per square mile (42.4/km^{2}). There were 21 housing units at an average density of 85.4 per square mile (33.0/km^{2}). The racial makeup was 85.19% (23) white or European American (85.19% non-Hispanic white), 3.7% (1) black or African-American, 0.0% (0) Native American or Alaska Native, 0.0% (0) Asian, 0.0% (0) Pacific Islander or Native Hawaiian, 0.0% (0) from other races, and 11.11% (3) from two or more races. Hispanic or Latino of any race was 0.0% (0) of the population.

Of the 15 households, 13.3% had children under the age of 18; 46.7% were married couples living together; 6.7% had a female householder with no spouse or partner present. 26.7% of households consisted of individuals and 13.3% had someone living alone who was 65 years of age or older. The average household size was 2.7 and the average family size was 4.1.

7.4% of the population was under the age of 18, 0.0% from 18 to 24, 37.0% from 25 to 44, 29.6% from 45 to 64, and 25.9% who were 65 years of age or older. The median age was 50.5 years. For every 100 females, there were 58.8 males. For every 100 females ages 18 and older, there were 66.7 males.

The 2016–2020 5-year American Community Survey estimates show that the median household income was $53,438 (with a margin of error of +/- $30,379). Females had a median income of $20,000 (+/- $10,628) for females. The median income for those above 16 years old was $26,042 (+/- $13,535).

=== 2010 census ===
As of the census of 2010, there were 30 people, 11 households, and 10 families residing in the city. The population density was 130.4 inhabitants per square mile (50.3/km^{2}). There were 22 housing units at an average density of 95.7 per square mile (36.9/km^{2}). The racial makeup of the city was 96.7% White and 3.3% from two or more races.

There were 11 households, of which 27.3% had children under the age of 18 living with them, 63.6% were married couples living together, 9.1% had a female householder with no husband present, 18.2% had a male householder with no wife present, and 9.1% were non-families. 9.1% of all households were made up of individuals. The average household size was 2.73 and the average family size was 2.90.

The median age in the city was 45.5 years. 16.7% of residents were under the age of 18; 16.7% were between the ages of 18 and 24; 16.6% were from 25 to 44; 36.7% were from 45 to 64; and 13.3% were 65 years of age or older. The gender makeup of the city was 60.0% male and 40.0% female.

=== 2000 census ===
As of the census of 2000, there were 81 people, 25 households, and 21 families residing in the city. The population density was 353.7 inhabitants per square mile (136.6/km^{2}). There were 28 housing units at an average density of 122.3 per square mile (47.2/km^{2}). The racial makeup of the city was 95.06% White, 1.23% from other races, and 3.70% from two or more races. Hispanic or Latino of any race were 1.23% of the population.

There were 25 households, out of which 52.0% had children under the age of 18 living with them, 72.0% were married couples living together, 12.0% had a female householder with no husband present, and 16.0% were non-families. 16.0% of all households were made up of individuals, and 8.0% had someone living alone who was 65 years of age or older. The average household size was 3.24 and the average family size was 3.62.

In the city, the population was spread out, with 38.3% under the age of 18, 8.6% from 18 to 24, 27.2% from 25 to 44, 18.5% from 45 to 64, and 7.4% who were 65 years of age or older. The median age was 27 years. For every 100 females, there were 118.9 males. For every 100 females age 18 and over, there were 100.0 males.

The median income for a household in the city was $42,500, and the median income for a family was $42,500. Males had a median income of $43,750 versus $22,083 for females. The per capita income for the city was $12,939. There were 9.1% of families and 6.3% of the population living below the poverty line, including no under eighteens and none of those over 64.

== Education ==
The community is served by Morris County USD 417 public school district.
