= Benjamin "Pap" Singleton =

American activist and businessman (1809–1900)

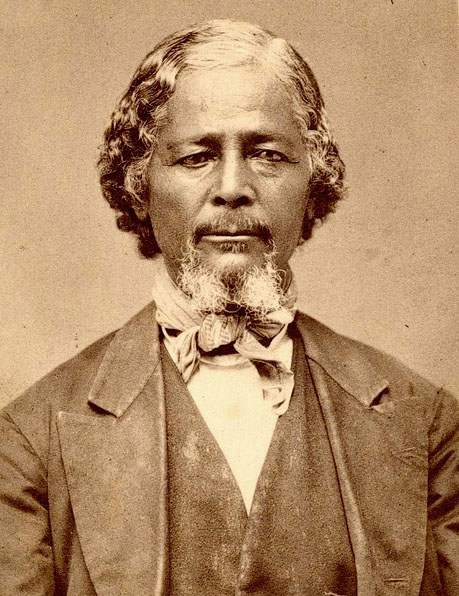
- Born: August 15, 1809; Davidson County, Tennessee, US
- Died: February 17, 1900 (aged 90); Kansas City, Missouri, US
- Resting place: Union Cemetery; Kansas City, Missouri
- Movement: Abolitionist

Benjamin "Pap" Singleton (August 15, 1809 – February 17, 1900) was an American activist and businessman best known for his role in establishing African American settlements in Kansas. A former slave from Tennessee who escaped to freedom in Ontario in 1846, he returned to the United States, settling for a period in Detroit. He became a noted abolitionist, community leader, and spokesman for African-American civil rights.

Singleton returned to Tennessee during the Union occupation in 1862 but concluded that blacks would never achieve economic equality in the white-dominated South. After the end of Reconstruction, Singleton organized the movement of thousands of black colonists, known as Exodusters, to found settlements in the free state of Kansas. A prominent voice for early black nationalism, he became involved in promoting and coordinating black-owned businesses in Kansas and developed an interest in the Back-to-Africa movement.

== Early life and education ==
Although it is known that Singleton was enslaved at birth in 1809 in Davidson County near Nashville, Tennessee, details of his early life remain scant. He was the son of a white father and an enslaved black mother. As a youth, he was trained as a carpenter but regretted never learning to read and write. Reportedly Singleton made several attempts to escape slavery but was unsuccessful.

In 1846, Singleton managed to escape to freedom. He made his way north along the Underground Railroad to Windsor, Ontario, and remained there a year before relocating to Detroit, Michigan, where he lived as a scavenger and used what resources he could to help other escaped slaves find their way to freedom in Canada. Singleton lived in Detroit until after the Civil War was underway. During this time, he worked as a carpenter.

== Separatism ==
After the Union Army occupied Middle Tennessee in 1862, Singleton returned and took up residence in Nashville, believing his freedom would be protected within Union lines. He worked as a cabinetmaker and coffin maker. As freedmen were still subject to white racial violence and political problems, Singleton concluded that blacks would have no chance for equality in the South. Disgusted by political leaders who failed to deliver on promises of equality for freedmen, in 1869 Singleton joined forces with Columbus M. Johnson, a black minister in Sumner County, and began looking for ways to establish black economic independence.

In 1874, Singleton and Johnson founded the Edgefield Real Estate Association with the goal of helping African Americans acquire land in the Nashville area. White landowners were unwilling to bargain with them and wanted too high prices for their land. Convinced that freedmen must leave the South to achieve true economic independence, in 1875 Singleton began to explore the idea of planting black colonies in the American West. His real estate organization was renamed the Edgefield Real Estate and Homestead Association. In 1876, Singleton and Johnson traveled to Kansas to scout land in Cherokee County in the southeastern corner of the state. Heartened by what he saw, Singleton returned to Nashville and began recruiting settlers for a proposed colony.

== Singleton colonies ==
In the summer of 1877, Singleton led approximately 73 black settlers to Cherokee County near Baxter Springs. Once the settlers arrived, they began negotiating with the Missouri River, Fort Scott, and Gulf Railroad for land to build their proposed Singleton Colony. Their timing was late, as rich lead deposits had been discovered in the area the previous year, which led to a mining boom and caused land prices to rise too high for their funds. Without the ability to buy land, they could not create a colony in Cherokee County. Singleton began looking elsewhere.

He searched for government land which his settlers could acquire through the 1862 Homestead Act. He found some available land on what had been the former Kaw Indian Reservation near Dunlap, Kansas, on the borders of Morris and Lyon counties. Dunlap was situated along the tracks of the Missouri-Kansas-Texas Railroad which extended into Kansas from Missouri. The land was marginal, but in the spring of 1878, Singleton's settlers left middle Tennessee for Kansas via steamboats on the Cumberland River. The following year they officially established the Dunlap colony. More than 2,400 settlers emigrated from the Davidson and Sumner County areas. Most settlers lived in dugouts during their first year on the Great Plains. They stuck it out and made the colony a success.

== Exodusters, 1879–80 ==
By 1879 of the "Great Exodus", 50,000 freedmen known as Exodusters had migrated from the South to escape poverty and racial violence following whites' regaining political control across the former Confederacy. They migrated to Kansas, Missouri, Indiana and Illinois seeking land, better working conditions, and the chance to live in peace. Part of Topeka, Kansas, was known as "Tennessee Town" because of many migrants from that state. Most had no direct connection with Singleton's organized colony movement, but Singleton and his followers were sympathetic to their plight. Many white Kansans began to object to the arrival of so many desperately poor blacks into their state. Singleton stepped forward to defend the Exodusters' right to try to make better lives in the American West.

In 1880, Singleton was requested to appear before the United States Senate in Washington, D.C., to testify on the causes of the Great Exodus to Kansas. Singleton rebuffed the efforts of southern Senators to discredit the Exodus Movement. He testified to his own success in setting up independent black colonies and noted the terrible conditions which caused freedmen to leave the South. Singleton returned to Kansas as a nationally recognized spokesman for the Exodusters. But the migration of so many poor blacks put more of a financial burden on the Dunlap Colony than the original settlers could bear. By 1880, the Presbyterian Church had taken charitable control of the settlement; it planned to build a Freedmen's Academy in the town. Singleton had no more dealings with his colony at Dunlap.

== Final years ==
By 1881, Singleton was referred to affectionately as "old Pap". He used his reputation to bring together blacks into an organization called the Colored United Links (CUL). The goal of the CUL, which he created in Topeka, was to combine the financial resources of all black people to build black-owned businesses, factories, and trade schools. The group held several conventions and was successful enough locally that Republican Party officials in Kansas became interested in its potential political strength. Presidential candidate James B. Weaver of the Greenback Party met with CUL leaders, to discuss fusion between the two groups. After 1881, CUL membership faltered, however, and the organization soon fell apart.

After the failure of the CUL, Singleton became convinced that blacks would never be allowed to succeed in the United States. In 1883, he briefly joined with Joseph Ware, a St. Louis, Missouri, businessman, and John Williams, a black minister, in proposing that American blacks migrate to the Mediterranean island of Cyprus. That idea was not developed.

In 1885, Singleton moved to Kansas City, where he began to organize around Pan-Africanism. In 1885, he founded the United Transatlantic Society (UTS) with the goal of having all blacks relocate from the United States to Africa, where such Western-influenced colonies as Sierra Leone and Liberia had been founded by Great Britain and the United States, respectively. In this time period, Bishop Henry McNeil Turner also had his own proposed African migration movement. The UTS lasted until 1887 but never sent anyone to Africa.

In poor health, Singleton retired from his life of activism. He raised his voice one final time in 1889 to call for a portion of the newly opening Oklahoma Territory to be reserved as an all-black state. He died on February 17, 1900, in Kansas City. He is buried in Union Cemetery.

== Family ==
Benjamin Singleton married and was the father of several children. Two of his children – Emily, born about 1840 in Tennessee, and Sarah, born about 1858 in Michigan – wrote letters to their father from East Nashville, Tennessee, during the mid-1880s. An undated note regarding Singleton's testimony before the U.S. Senate Committee in 1880 quotes Singleton as saying: "I have been a slave fled to Canada when my children were small and nineteen years after when I returned they were grown."

His son Joshua W. Singleton settled in Allensworth, California, a black agricultural settlement. Joshua's grandchildren, through his married daughter Virginia Louise Williams and her husband John, were John Williams Jr., Midge Williams (1915-1952), Charles and Robert Williams. As young adults, they started singing together in the Bay Area as the Williams Quartette. In 1928 they started touring as the Williams Four. In 1933, they had a successful tour in Shanghai, China, which was a destination for increasing numbers of European refugees, and Japan. Midge Williams also sang as a swing jazz soloist in the late 1930s and 1940s. She recorded with a group as Midge Williams and Her Jazz Jesters.

== Legacy and honors ==
In 2002, American scholar Molefi Kete Asante listed "Pap" Singleton as among the 100 Greatest African Americans.

== History of colonies ==
Singleton did not establish his Real Estate Association prior to 1874 and did not make his first scouting trip to Kansas until 1876; the Singleton Colony in Cherokee County failed almost immediately after being settled. Nicodemus, Kansas, was founded independently in 1877 by black settlers from Kentucky, one year before Singleton founded his successful colony at Dunlap.
