= Senator Manning =

Senator Manning may refer to:

- Gayle Manning (born 1950), Ohio State Senate
- George T. Manning (1908–1956), New York State Senate
- James Manning Jr. (fl. 2010s), Oregon State Senate
- James S. Manning (1859–1938), North Carolina State Senate
- John Lawrence Manning (1816–1889), South Carolina State Senate
- Nathan Manning (born 1982), Ohio State Senate
- Randolph Manning (1804–1864), Michigan State Senate
- Richard Irvine Manning I (1789–1836), South Carolina State Senate

== See also ==
- Senator Mann (disambiguation)
