= John H. Ricksecker =

American Civil War Medal of Honor recipient (1843–1929)

John Henry Ricksecker
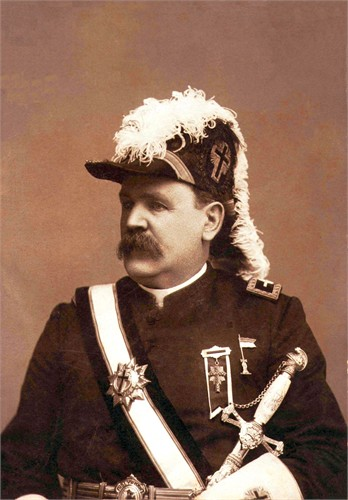
- Ricksecker in 1865
- Born: November 14, 1843; Richland County, Ohio, U.S.
- Died: August 2, 1929 (aged 85); Kansas City, Missouri, U.S.
- Burial place: Forest Hill Calvary Cemetery; Kansas City, Missouri, U.S.
- Military career
- Allegiance: United States (Union)
- Branch: Union Army
- Rank: Private
- Units: Company D, 106th Ohio Volunteer Infantry
- Awards: Medal of Honor

John Henry Ricksecker (14 November 1843 - 2 August 1929) was a private in the United States Army who was awarded the Medal of Honor for gallantry during the American Civil War. On November 30, 1864, Ricksecker captured the flag of the 16th Alabama Artillery of the Confederate Army. For this action, he received the Medal of Honor on 3 February 1865.

== Personal life ==
Ricksecker was born in Richland County, Ohio, on November 14, 1843, to parents John Henry Ricksecker Sr. and Eliza Geiger Ricksecker. He was the fifth of eight children, all surviving to adulthood. He married Estella May Loomis and fathered 6 children, of which only one, John Gordon Ricksecker, survived to adulthood. He died on August 2, 1929, in Kansas City, Missouri and was buried in Forest Hill Calvary Cemetery in Kansas City.

== Military service ==
Ricksecker was a private in Company D of the 104th Ohio Infantry. He was awarded the Medal of Honor for capturing the flag of the 16th Alabama Artillery at the Battle of Franklin near Franklin, Tennessee, on November 30, 1864.
