= Arthur Chapman (Missouri politician) =

American businessman and politician (1863–1928)

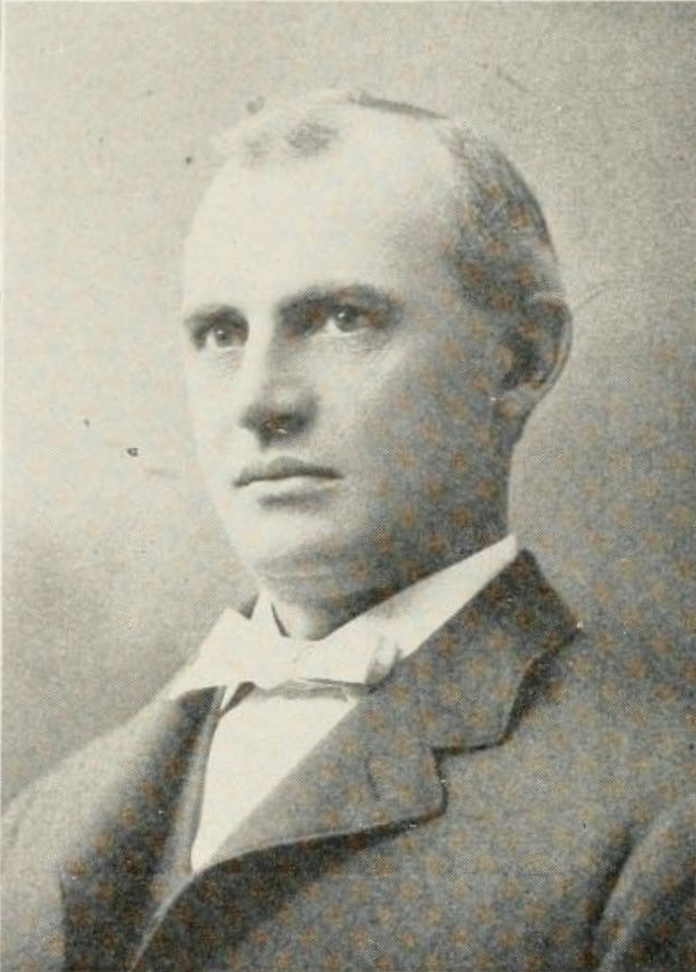
- Chapman (c. 1902)

Member of the Missouri House of Representatives
- In office 1902

Personal details
- Born: December 30, 1863 Clay County, Missouri, U.S.
- Died: July 24, 1928 (aged 64) Kansas City, Missouri, U.S.
- Resting place: Forest Hill Calvary Cemetery; Kansas City, Missouri, U.S.
- Party: Democratic
- Spouse(s): Jessie Wallace (m. 1886; div. 1909) Jewel C. Fuller (m. 1909)
- Children: 5
- Occupation: Businessman; politician

Arthur Chapman (December 30, 1863 – July 24, 1928) was a businessman and state politician from Missouri.

== Early life ==
Arthur Chapman was born on December 30, 1863, in Clay County, Missouri, to Andrew L. Chapman. His father was a physician. His family moved to Kansas City, Missouri in 1866. His brothers were Campbell and Homer. He attended public schools and graduated Central High School. He worked as a paperboy and also worked as one of the first switchboard operators for a telephone company in Kansas City.

== Career ==
After graduating high school, Chapman worked for the Kansas City, Fort Scott and Memphis Railroad. He later worked as the chief clerk at the Southern Kansas Railroad. Chapman was then appointed Deputy Recorder of Deeds and served as Secretary of the Board of Health. He also worked in the City Engineer's office in Kansas City. In 1899, Chapman joined the mercantile business.

Chapman was a Democrat. He was elected to the Missouri House of Representatives, representing the 7th District, in 1902.

== Personal life ==
Chapman married Jessie Wallace in 1886. They had at least four children, Wallace, Josephine, Ella and Clifford. Chapman had an additional daughter, Barbara. Chapman and his wife divorced on April 12, 1909. Chapman married Jewel C. Fuller on April 21, 1909.

Chapman died on July 24, 1928, at General Hospital in Kansas City. He was buried at Forest Hill Calvary Cemetery in Kansas City.
