= Fayette County, Virginia =

Fayette County, Virginia has existed twice in the U.S. state of Virginia's history. Formed in 1780, and 1831, respectively, both counties were named in honor of the Marquis de Lafayette, who had played a key role assisting the Continental Army during the American Revolutionary War, and each was separated from Virginia due to the creation of a new state, partitioned in accordance with Article IV, Section 3, Clause 1 of the United States Constitution. The two counties continued in existence as:

- Fayette County, Kentucky, separated when Kentucky was admitted to the Union in 1792.
- Fayette County, West Virginia, separated when West Virginia was admitted to the Union in 1863.

== See also ==
- Former counties, cities, and towns of Virginia
