= Joseph M. Patterson (politician) =

American politician (1837–1914)

Member of the Illinois Senate from the 11th district
- In office 1872–1874
- Preceded by: redistricted
- Succeeded by: Henry A. Mills

Personal details
- Born: August 12, 1837 Mount Joy, Pennsylvania, U.S.
- Died: January 26, 1914 (aged 76) Kansas City, Missouri, U.S.
- Resting place: Forest Hill Calvary Cemetery; Kansas City, Missouri, U.S.
- Profession: Attorney and banker

Joseph M. Patterson (August 12, 1837 – January 26, 1914) was an American politician from Pennsylvania. Moving to Sterling, Illinois, in 1857, Patterson quickly became a prominent lawyer. He served with the 15th Illinois Volunteer Infantry Regiment in the Civil War and was mustered out as a lieutenant. Soon after his return to Sterling, he was elected an alderman (1868), then township supervisor (1869–1874). In 1872, Patterson was elected to the Illinois Senate for a two-year term. Patterson briefly served as township supervisor again 1877 before being elected Mayor of Sterling.

== Biography ==
Joseph M. Patterson was born in Mount Joy, Pennsylvania, on August 12, 1837. In 1857, he moved west to Sterling, Illinois, where he was admitted as a partner to the Patterson, Witmer & Co. law firm. When the Civil War broke out in 1861, he joined Company B of the 15th Illinois Volunteer Infantry Regiment and was soon named Orderly Sergeant. In 1863, he was made a lieutenant. He was mustered out in 1864 and returned to his law firm. He left in 1866, entering a partnership the next year with the Rogers, Patterson & Co. banking house. When it dissolved, Patterson joined the Patterson & Co. bank in Sterling.

In 1868, Patterson was elected alderman of Sterling's 2nd Ward, serving a two-year term. During this term, he was also elected township supervisor for a four-year term, leading the board for two years. However, he resigned in 1872 following his election to the Illinois Senate, where he served a two-year term. Patterson co-founded the Sterling Gsa Light Company in 1874 and served as its first president. He was re-elected to his position as township supervisor in 1876, then was elected Mayor of Sterling the next year.

Patterson later moved to Kansas City, Missouri. He died there on January 26, 1914, and was buried in Forest Hill Calvary Cemetery in Kansas City.
