= William Tell Johnson =

American politician (1848–1930)

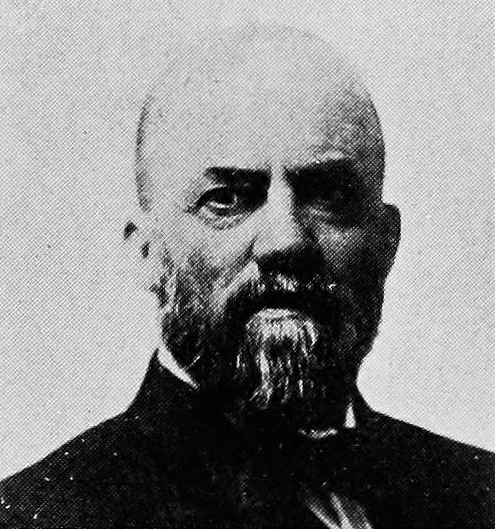
- Johnson in 1917 publication

Personal details
- Born: August 4, 1848 Osceola, Missouri, U.S.
- Died: September 11, 1930 (aged 82) Kansas City, Missouri, U.S.
- Resting place: Forest Hill Calvary Cemetery; Kansas City, Missouri, U.S.
- Party: Democratic
- Spouse: Agnes M. Harris (m. 1885)
- Children: 3
- Parent: Waldo P. Johnson (father)
- Education: University of Notre Dame (BA, MA)
- Occupation: Politician; judge; lawyer
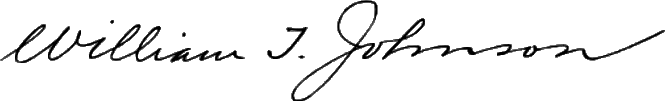
- Signature

William Tell Johnson (August 4, 1848 – September 11, 1930) was an American politician, judge and lawyer from Missouri.

== Early life ==
William Tell Johnson was born on August 4, 1848, in Osceola, Missouri, to Emily (née Moore) and Waldo P. Johnson. His father was a U.S. Senator, member of the Confederate States Senate and advisor to Jefferson Davis. He studied at private and grammar schools in Hamilton, Ontario. He graduated from University of Notre Dame with Bachelor of Arts and Master of Arts degrees. He studied law at the office of his father and was admitted to the bar in Butler in 1872.

== Career ==
Johnson served as mayor of Osceola in 1872. He served as judge of the St. Clair County probate court from 1873 to 1874.

Johnson opened the law firm Johnson & Lucas in Osceola with John H. Lucas in 1874. They expanded to Kansas City in 1879. In 1883, William H. Lucas joined the firm. The firm was later renamed Johnson, Lucas, Landon & Graves. After moving to Kansas City, Johnson became an advisor to the bishop of the Kansas City diocese. He remained in that role until his death.

Johnson was a Democrat. In 1921, Johnson was a member of the Missouri constitutional convention.

He served as vice president of the Western Exchange Bank. He was a member of the National Geographical Society. He was also a farmer and operated several farms.

== Personal life ==
Johnson became a Catholic in 1867. He married Agnes M. Harris on September 5, 1885. They had three children, Robert W., Mrs. Mary J. Bland and Mrs. Margaret J. Morley. He was friends with Bishop Thomas Francis Lillis.

Johnson moved to Kansas City in 1880. Johnson died on September 11, 1930, at his home at 3659 Harrison Street in Kansas City. He was buried at Forest Hill Calvary Cemetery.

== Awards and legacy ==
Johnson received the Knighthood of St. Gregory from the Pope in 1924.
