= Waldo P. Johnson =

American politician (1817–1885)

Waldo Johnson
- Johnson c. 1875

Confederate States Senator from Missouri
- In office December 24, 1863 – May 10, 1865
- Preceded by: Robert Peyton
- Succeeded by: Seat abolished

United States Senator from Missouri
- In office March 17, 1861 – January 10, 1862
- Preceded by: James Green
- Succeeded by: Robert Wilson

Member of the Missouri House of Representatives
- In office 1847–1848

Personal details
- Born: Waldo Porter Johnson; September 16, 1817 Bridgeport, Virginia, U.S. (now West Virginia)
- Died: August 14, 1885 (aged 67) Osceola, Missouri, U.S.
- Resting place: Forest Hill Calvary Cemetery; Kansas City, Missouri, U.S.
- Party: Democratic
- Children: William Tell Johnson
- Education: Rector College (BA)

Military service
- Allegiance: United States; Confederate States
- Branch/service: United States Army; Confederate States Army
- Unit: 1st Missouri Regiment of Mounted Volunteers; 4th Missouri Infantry Regiment
- Battles/wars: Mexican–American War; American Civil War

Waldo Porter Johnson (September 16, 1817 – August 14, 1885) was an American lawyer and politician who served as a Missouri state representative, as well as briefly as a U.S. senator before being expelled for treason in 1862, then serving as a Confederate States Army officer and Confederate States senator from Missouri from 1863 to 1865 and finally as chairman of the Missouri constitutional convention of 1875.

== Early and family life ==
Born in Bridgeport, Virginia (present-day West Virginia), to the former Olive Waldo (1798-1852) and her New York-born cousin and husband, William Johnson (1791-1868). Waldo Porter Johnson had a dozen siblings and attended public and private schools. His father had become Bridgeport's postmaster, and his older brother (this boy's uncle) Joseph Johnson was a prominent local farmer and politician who intermittently served as the area's Congressman during this boy's youth and became Governor of Virginia in 1851, after this Johnson moved to Missouri as described below. W.P. Johnson graduated from Baptist-affiliated Rector College (Pruntytown, Virginia) in 1839.

== Career ==
After reading law, Johnson was admitted to the Virginia bar, and began his legal practice in Harrison County, Virginia in 1841.

A year later, in 1842, Johnson moved westward to Osceola, Missouri, and continued his legal practice in the developing (and troubled) border between Missouri and what became the State of Kansas following the Missouri Compromise of 1850.

Meanwhile, Johnson volunteered to fight in the Mexican–American War, serving as a private in the First Missouri Regiment of Mounted Volunteers. In 1847, he won election to the Missouri House of Representatives and was elected circuit attorney in 1848 and judge of the seventh judicial circuit in 1851. He resigned his government positions in 1852 and resumed his private legal practice.

During the 1850s, Johnson filed several land claims with the General Land office.

Missouri voters elected Johnson as a Democrat to the United States Senate in 1860, and he served from March 17, 1861, to January 10, 1862, when he was expelled from the Senate for disloyalty to the government. He was a member of the peace convention of 1861 held in Washington, D.C., in an effort to devise means to prevent the impending American Civil War.

Johnson volunteered to serve in the Confederate Army during the Civil War, having attained the rank of Major in the Missouri State Guard. He recruited a battalion which fought in the Battle of Pea Ridge near Bentonville, Arkansas. On April 28, 1862, his unit was reorganized in Memphis, Tennessee, as the 4th Missouri Infantry Regiment (Confederate) with Johnson as lieutenant colonel. In 1863, Johnson was appointed a member of the Confederate States Senate to fill a vacancy.

Following the Confederate surrender, Johnson resided in Hamilton, Ontario from August 1865 to April 1866. He returned to Osceola, received a presidential pardon and resumed his legal practice. Johnson was president of the State constitutional convention in 1875.

== Personal life ==
In 1847 he married Emily Moore (1822-1884) in Harrison County. By 1850 they lived in Missouri, where she had given birth to the future lawyer and judge William Tell Johnson (1848-1930). In the 1860 census, Johnson's real estate and personal property values had soared, and his family included 11 year old W.T. Johnson and his brothers Charles (1859-1901), St. Clair (1855-1900) and Thomas Moore Johnson (1851-1919), Johnson also owned a 30 year old mulatto woman as a slave.

== Death and legacy ==
Johnson survived his wife, but died of a lung abscess in Osceola in 1885. He was reburied in the elaborate family tomb at Forest Hill Calvary Cemetery in Kansas City, Missouri. His son William Tell Johnson also became a Missouri lawyer and judge, and named a son to honor this man. His son Thomas Moore Johnson also became a lawyer, as well as Osceola's mayor and a writer. Their son St. Clair Johnson moved to Texas, where he died, but his remains and those of his brother Charles were later returned for burial at Forest Hill Cemetery.

== See also ==
- List of United States senators expelled or censured

U.S. Senate
Preceded by James Green	United States Senator (Class 3) from Missouri; 1861–1862; Served alongside: Trusten Polk	Succeeded by Robert Wilson
Confederate States Senate
Preceded by Robert Peyton	Confederate States Senator (Class 2) from Missouri; 1863–1865; Served alongside: John Clark, George Vest	Seat abolished
