= Senator Mann =

Senator Mann may refer to:

- Alice Mann (politician) (born 1980), Minnesota State Senate
- Charles A. Mann (1803–1860), New York State Senate
- Curtis Mann (1815–1894), Wisconsin State Senate
- Horace Mann (1796–1859), Massachusetts State Senate
- James Mann (1822–1868), Maine State Senate
- Job Mann (1795–1873), Pennsylvania State Senate
- Joel Keith Mann (1780–1857), Pennsylvania State Senate
- Kenny Mann (fl. 2010s), West Virginia State Senate
- Mark Mann (politician) (fl. 2010s–present), Oklahoma State Senate
- Thomas Mann (Iowa politician) (born 1949), Iowa State Senate
- William Hodges Mann (1843–1927), Virginia State Senate

== See also ==
- Representative Mann (disambiguation)
- Senator Manning (disambiguation)
