= Joseph Boggs =

American Army officer (1749–1843)

- Born: Joseph A. Boggs; October 20, 1749; Chester County, Pennsylvania, US
- Died: January 22, 1843 (aged 93); Clay County, Missouri, US
- Relatives: Lilburn Boggs (nephew)
- Military career
- Branch: Army
- Rank: Lieutenant
- War: American Revolutionary War

Joseph A. Boggs (October 20, 1749 – January 22, 1843) was an American Army officer. Ranked Lieutenant, he fought in the American Revolutionary War.

== Biography ==
Boggs was born on October 20, 1749, at the Gum Tree post office in Chester County, Pennsylvania, to William and Jane Boggs (née Stein). He married Sarah Riddle in 1773, having three children; she was born in 1755 and died in 1810, in Madison County, Kentucky.

In September 1777, Boggs enlisted in the United States Army, serving under Lieutenant Colonel John Bartholomew in the 1st company of the 4th Pennsylvania Regiment. After serving, he began selling land lots; including a 40-acre property to his nephew Lilburn. He owned land in Madison County, Kentucky, Howard County, Missouri and Clay County, Missouri. He also sold land to Nathan Scarritt, who used the land to build the Reverend Nathan Scarritt Home.

Boggs died on January 22, 1843, in Clay County, Missouri, aged 93. He was buried in the Old Westport Cemetery, and was possibly moved to the Forest Hill Calvary Cemetery in 1915.
