= Homer B. Mann =

American newspaperman and politician (1869–1950)

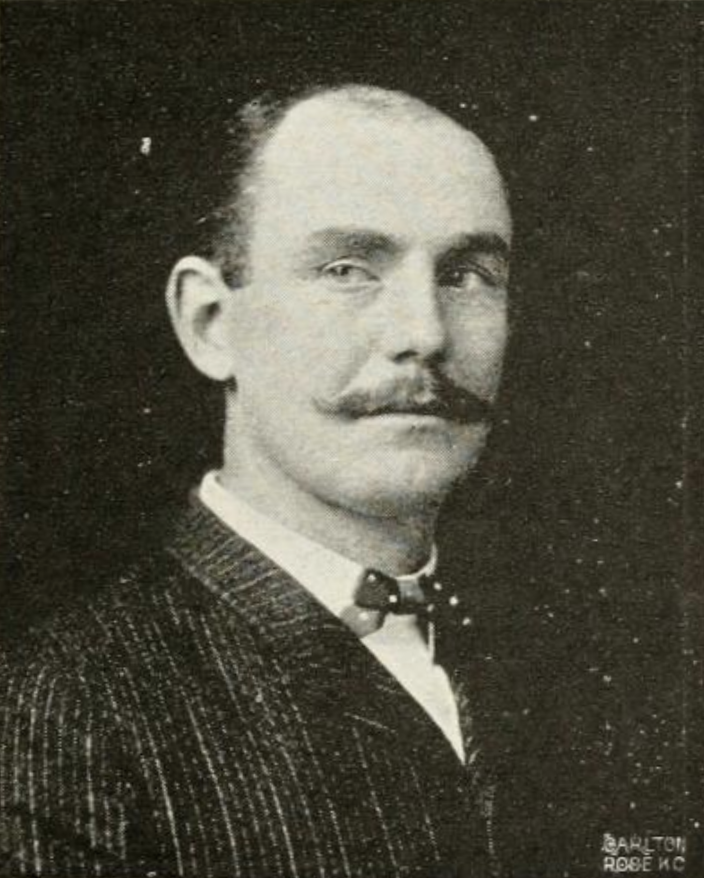
- Mann (c. 1902)

Member of the Missouri House of Representatives
- In office 1898

Personal details
- Born: June 16, 1869 Chester, Illinois, U.S.
- Died: August 6, 1950 (aged 81) Kansas City, Missouri, U.S.
- Resting place: Forest Hill Calvary Cemetery; Kansas City, Missouri, U.S.
- Party: Republican
- Spouse: Sallie Campbell (m. 1892)
- Children: 2
- Education: Park College
- Occupation: Newspaperman; insurance businessman; politician

Homer B. Mann (June 16, 1869 – August 6, 1950) was a newspaperman, state politician and insurance businessman from Missouri. He served as president of Park College for 25 years.

== Early life ==
Homer B. Mann was born on June 16, 1869, in Chester, Illinois, to Sarah Stuart (née Hood) and Alfred M. Mann. His father was of Welsh ancestry and his mother was of Irish ancestry. His father was a Presbyterian missionary and was known for starting Presbyterian churches throughout Kansas. The family moved to Missouri. He attended public schools in Missouri and Park College for three years, leaving in 1891.

== Career ==
In 1891, Mann moved to Kansas City, Missouri, and worked as a cashier at the Holland Shoe Company. In the winter of 1891, Mann moved to Minot, North Dakota, and he became the editor of the Minot Journal. He worked as editor for three and a half years. He was appointed as city clerk of Minot and served two terms. Mann moved to Kansas City, Missouri, in 1894. He worked for Drovers Telegram until 1896.

In 1896, Mann was appointed to a clerkship by Mayor James M. Jones. He was then appointed as Superintendent of Sidewalks and Curbing. Homer was a Republican. He was elected to the Missouri House of Representatives, representing the 2nd district, in November 1898. Mann was later re-appointed as Superintendent of Sidewalks and Curbing. In Spring of 1900, Mann joined the W. S. Dickey Clay Company. He remained with that company until February 1904. He later organized the firm Trout & Mann, a fire and accident insurance business. Mann worked with P. S. Brown and Sons Insurance Company (later Brown & Mann), joining as a junior member in 1904. His insurance company later was renamed the Mann, Kerdolff, Kline & Welsh firm.

In 1902, Mann was elected to the lower house of the Kansas City, Missouri City Council. He served two terms and one as speaker. Mann served as the treasurer of the Republican County Central Committee and served as delegate to the Missouri State Conventions for about ten years.

Mann served as president of Park College for 25 years. He served on the board of trustees of Park College for 33 years. Mann retired as president of the board of trustees in 1939.

== Personal life ==
Mann married Sallie Hood Campbell of Paola, Kansas, on October 15, 1892. They had two children, Fred C. and Robert H.

Mann built his home at 2834 Olive Street around 1906 in Kansas City. He later moved to 1310 Manheim Road. About 1924, Homer built his home at 1209 West 58th Street. Homer died of a heart attack on August 6, 1950, at his home. He was buried at Forest Hill Calvary Cemetery in Kansas City.
