= Atwell =

Atwell may refer to:

== People ==
- Atwell (surname)

== Places ==
In the United States

- Atwell, Missouri, an unincorporated community
- Atwell, West Virginia, an unincorporated community
- Atwell Township, Rowan County, North Carolina, a civil township

Elsewhere

- Atwell, Western Australia, a suburb of Perth
- Atwell Peak, the southern peak of Mount Garibaldi, a stratovolcano in British Columbia, Canada

== Other ==
- Atwell, a house of The Skinners' School in England
- Atwell College, Western Australia
- Atwell Suites, one of brands of IHG Hotels & Resorts

== See also ==
- Attwell (disambiguation)
- Atwill
