= Robert Nelson Spencer =

American bishop of West Missouri (1877–1961)

The Right Reverend Robert Nelson Spencer
- Bishop of West Missouri
- Church: Episcopal Church
- Diocese: West Missouri
- Elected: May 13, 1930
- In office: 1930-1949
- Predecessor: Sidney Catlin Partridge
- Successor: Edward R. Welles II

Orders
- Ordination: April 5, 1904 (deacon); June 4, 1905 (priest) by Frank Rosebrook Millspaugh
- Consecration: October 28, 1930 by William Theodotus Capers

Personal details
- Born: February 18, 1877 Tunnel, New York, U.S.
- Died: July 19, 1961 (aged 84) Ludington, Michigan, U.S.
- Buried: Forest Hill Calvary Cemetery; Kansas City, Missouri, U.S.
- Denomination: Anglican
- Parents: Nelson Horatio Spencer & Hannah E. Pratt
- Spouse: Amy Frances Moffatt (m. 1905; died 1954)
- Children: Kathleen Spencer

Robert Nelson Spencer (February 18, 1877 – August 19, 1961) was a hymn writer and the third bishop of West Missouri in The Episcopal Church, serving from October 28, 1930, to 1949.

== Early life and education ==
Spencer was born on February 18, 1877, in Tunnel, New York, the son of Nelson Horatio Spencer and Hannah E. Pratt. He studied at Dickinson College between 1896 and 1899, and then at the Kansas Theological School, from where he graduated in 1904. He was awarded a Doctor of Divinity in 1931 and a Doctor of Laws in 1943 from Dickson.

== Ordained ministry ==
Spencer was ordained deacon on April 5, 1904, and priest on June 4, 1905, by Bishop Frank Rosebrook Millspaugh of Kansas. He married Amy Frances Moffatt on September 14, 1905, and together had a daughter. He was rector of the Church of the Covenant in Junction City, Kansas, and special preacher at Fort Riley between 1904 and 1907. He was then rector of St John's Church in Springfield, Missouri, from 1907 to 1909. In 1909 he transferred to Grace and Holy Trinity Church in Kansas City, Missouri, to serve as its rector, where he remained until 1930. He was also chaplain Saint Luke's Hospital in Kansas City between 1923 and 1930.

== Bishop ==
Spencer was elected Coadjutor Bishop of West Missouri during it 41st annual convention at Christ Church in St. Joseph, Missouri, on May 13, 1930. Since Bishop Partridge died a month after the elected, he automatically became the diocesan bishop elect. He was consecrated on October 28, 1930, in Grace and Holy Trinity Church by the Bishop of West Texas William Theodotus Capers. He served as acting Missionary Bishop of Salina between 1939 and 1941. He retired in 1949 and died on August 19, 1961, in Ludington, Michigan. He was buried at Forest Hill Calvary Cemetery in Kansas City.

A senior living facility in Kansas City is named for him.

== Hymns ==
Spencer also wrote hymn texts. Notably he contributed to the well known hymn Eternal Father, Strong to Save and wrote O heavenly grace in holy rite descending.
