= Atwill =

Atwill is a surname. Notable people with the surname include:

- Douglass H. Atwill (1881–1960), American Episcopal bishop
- Edward Robert Atwill (1840–1911), American Episcopal bishop
- Henry Converse Atwill (1872–1936), American politician
- John Atwill (1926–2001), Australian lawyer and politician
- Lionel Atwill (1885–1946), English and American actor

== See also ==
- Atwell (surname)
