= Attwell =

Attwell is a surname. Notable people with the name include:

- Arthur Attwell (1920–1991), Anglican clergyman
- Bob Attwell (born 1959), Canadian ice hockey player
- David Attwell, British neuroscientist
- Erin Attwell (born 1999), Canadian cyclist
- Ernest T. Attwell (1877–1949), American football coach
- J. Evans Attwell (1931–2007), American attorney
- Hayley Atwell (born 1982), British-American actress
- Jamie Attwell (born 1982), English football player
- Lesley Attwell (born 1971), Canadian softball player
- Mabel Lucie Attwell (1879–1964), British illustrator
- Michael Attwell (1943–2006), English actor
- Reg Attwell (1920–1986), English football player
- Ron Attwell (1935–2017), Canadian ice hockey player
- Rory Attwell (born 1980), British musician
- Stuart Attwell (born 1982), English football referee

== See also ==
- Atwell (surname)
