= George T. Masuda =

Bishop of the Episcopal Diocese of North Dakota

The Right Reverend George Theodore Masuda D.D.
- Bishop of North Dakota
- Church: Episcopal Church
- Diocese: North Dakota
- Elected: October 1964
- In office: 1965–1979
- Predecessor: Richard R. Emery
- Successor: Harold A. Hopkins Jr.

Orders
- Ordination: March 25, 1943 by Henry H. Daniels
- Consecration: January 14, 1965 by Conrad H. Gesner

Personal details
- Born: March 13, 1913 Minneapolis, Minnesota, United States
- Died: December 17, 1995 (aged 82) Monterey County, California, United States
- Buried: St Mary's by-the-sea Church, Pacific Grove, California
- Denomination: Anglican
- Parents: Roy T. Masuda & Minnie T. Gilbertson
- Spouse: Jeanne Bennett (m. 1951)
- Children: 2
- Education: Seabury-Western Theological Seminary
- Alma mater: Carleton College

George Theodore Masuda (March 13, 1913 - December 17, 1995) was bishop of the Episcopal Diocese of North Dakota from 1965 to 1979.

== Early life and education ==
Masuda was born on March 13, 1913, in Minneapolis, Minnesota, the son of Roy T. Masuda and Minnie T. Gilbertson. He studied at Carleton College, graduating in 1934 with a Bachelor of Arts. He then enrolled at the Seabury-Western Theological Seminary, graduating with a Master of Divinity in 1942; he was awarded an honorary Doctor of Divinity in 1965.

== Ordained ministry ==
Masuda was ordained deacon on March 16, 1942, in the Chapel of St John the Divine at the Seabury-Western Theological Seminary, by Bishop Frank McElwain of Minnesota. He was ordained a priest on March 25, 1943, in Trinity Church, Whitefish, Montana, by Bishop Henry H. Daniels of Montana. He served as vicar of Trinity Church in Whitefish, Montana between 1942 and 1948, and then as rector of St Luke's Church in Billings, Montana, between 1948 and 1965. He married Jeanne Bennett on October 20, 1951, and together had two sons.

== Bishop ==
In October 1964, Masuda was elected Missionary Bishop of North Dakota, and was consecrated on January 14, 1965, in Gethsemane Cathedral by the Bishop of South Dakota Conrad H. Gesner. He became the first diocesan bishop when the Missionary District of North Dakota became a diocese in 1971. He remained in office till his retirement in 1979. He then served as Assistant Bishop of Washington. Masuda died on December 17, 1995, in Monterey County, California.
