= Chrystal Falls =

1980s novel series

Chrystal Falls is a novel series that was written over seven books by various ghost writers dealing with the residents of a fictional (and fiercely divided) Pennsylvania town. The books were published by Scholastic in the mid-1980s.

== Plot summary ==
Chrystal Falls is a mill community in Pennsylvania which is bisected by the Rapid River. The community was divided along class and economic strata lines, between the "Hill" where all the mansions were and the well-to-do lived; and the "Mill" area, the slightly more depressed area where the people who are employed by the Chrystal Mills live.

The town's richest family was the Chrystal Family, whose ancestors founded the community and the mills. Alexander, a prominent attorney, his socialite wife Elizabeth; his parents; and their children, Chelsea and Amy. They also had a son, Montgomery, called Monty, who was away at a reform school for arson.

Recently widowed doctor, Barbara Newhouse (née Barbara Gilbert) had just moved to Chrystal Falls, with her two children, Dawn and Josh. She joined the hospital staff, along with her brother, Walter, who was Chrystal Falls' most beloved physician. The family had lived in an apartment near the hospital for the first few months, until they moved into a larger house.

Most of the conflict in the story was between the populace over their location. It was often dealing with the Hill vs. Mill situation. Dawn, although she was related to someone who lived in the Hill section (because her uncle and mother were doctors) and was later classified as being part of the Hill crowd, had friends on both sides of the fence. To her, it mattered not who was Hill or who was Mill, she liked them basically as they were.

Dawn's best friend was Chelsea Chrystal, who had fallen in love with her brother, Josh. Not liking this choice of friendship was Chelsea's former steady date, Ryan Simpson, nicknamed Simp the Wimp, who was also a crack Tennis player, but was dethroned in that sport by Josh, also, Alexander Chrystal didn't like the idea of Chelsea dating Josh, although he enjoyed Dawn's company. Dawn got along wonderfully with the rest of the Chrystal family as well as with Chelsea.

Chelsea's other friend, Perky Palmer, the daughter of one of her father's law partners, was a vicious schemer whose constant lies had almost sent some of the Mill kids to jail. She was often derisively called the "Palmer Witch". However, eventually, Perky and Ryan began to unbend to Dawn and somewhat welcomed her into their circle of friends. Another friend was Ian McFarland, a young cultured man, who was friends with both Chelsea and Dawn.

Dawn's other friends included Mill kids, Karen Pickett; her boyfriend, Mitch; and her nascent love interest, Pete Carter, the son of a union leader at the mill. To quote Karen, whenever any of her Mill friends cut down Dawn, she would say that "Dawn's not a nut case, she's a very nice, decent person, and if the Hill had more of her, Chrystal Falls would be a better town." (quote from book #3 The Bad and the Beautiful) This stems from Dawn's stubbornness and her insistence that there was good in everyone, which explains why she is friendly with students from both factions.

What made it worse, was that the Hill vs. Mill conflict also entered into some of the adults lives and judgments. Some of the teachers and administrators blatantly gave the Hill kids preferential treatment, whilst the Mill kids got punished more harshly, and also on the flip side, people would gossip more harshly about the Hill people when they get away with something that the Mill people couldn't get away with.

Dawn, because of her neutrality, was punished in variable states, until she got more acclimated into the school and community life. To the administrators, she was later considered to be part of the Hill group because of her family's status as doctors.

The one member of their extended family that really had a lot of animosity towards them was Walter's wife, Victoria (called Aunt Vicki). At first, the Newhouses thought that their son, Tim, was bad, but it shocked them all that Tim was very nice and unpretentious, like his father, while his mother was hell-bent on making her sister in-law and her niece and nephew Hill people. Even Perky Palmer, at her worst, was more tolerable compared to Dawn's Aunt Vicki.

Much of the stories centered around the students at Chrystal Falls high school; and the requisite romances. Other situations include where Dawn was either kidnapped or injured; had to testify in court, or had to referee squabbles between her diverse set of friends, due to their prestige, or lack thereof.

== Bibliography ==
1. The Wrong Side of Love by Meredith Hill (1985, ISBN 0-590-33760-2)
2. Breaking the Rules by Candice F. Ransom (1985, ISBN 0-590-33761-0)
3. The Bad and the Beautiful by Caroline B. Cooney (1985, ISBN 0-590-33690-8)
4. The Morning After by Caroline B. Cooney (1985, ISBN 0-590-33691-6)
5. A Loss of Innocence by Meredith Hill (1986, ISBN 0-590-33744-0)
6. Forbidden Love by Meredith Hill (1986, ISBN 0-590-33745-9)
7. A Night to Forget by Diane Hoh (1986, ISBN 0-590-33985-0)
