= Martin Scott Field =

American bishop

The Right Reverend Martin Scott Field
- Bishop of West Missouri
- Church: Episcopal Church
- Diocese: West Missouri
- Elected: November 6, 2010
- In office: 2011-2021
- Predecessor: Barry Robert Howe
- Successor: Diane Jardine Bruce (provisional)

Orders
- Ordination: October 10, 1990 (deacon); May 2, 1991 (priest) by Donald Purple Hart
- Consecration: March 6, 2011 by Katharine Jefferts Schori

Personal details
- Born: September 13, 1956 (age 69) Salem, Ohio, United States
- Denomination: Anglican (prev. Disciples of Christ)
- Spouse: Donna Jean Cassarino (m. 1979)
- Children: 2

Martin Scott Field (born September 13, 1956) was the eighth bishop of the Episcopal Diocese of West Missouri from March 6, 2011, until September 14, 2021.

== Early life and education ==
Field was born on September 13, 1956, in Salem, Ohio. He was educated at Salem High School in Salem, Ohio, graduating in 1974. He then studied at Bethany College from where he earned a Bachelor of Arts in religious studies. He also earned a Master of Divinity in May 1983 from the Lexington Theological Seminary. He also undertook a Doctor of Ministry in congregational development at the Seabury-Western Theological Seminary in Evanston, Illinois, between 2004 and 2006.

== Ordained ministry ==
Field was ordained into ministry in the Christian Church (Disciples of Christ) on June 6, 1983, after which he ministered in Maryland and Ohio. After two years he joined the Episcopal Church and served as youth minister at St John's Church in Chevy Chase, Maryland, from 1985 until 1989. His ministry was then translated into the Holy Orders of the Episcopal Church when he was ordained a deacon on October 10, 1990, in the Diocese of Hawaii. He was ordained a priest in Hawaii on May 2, 1991, by Bishop Donald Purple Hart. He was a non-stipendiary assistant at St Christopher's Church in Kailua, Hawaii, between 1989 and 1993, after which he became interim rector of St Matthew's Church in Covington, Tennessee, and in 1996 interim rector of St Anne's Church in Millington, Tennessee.

He entered the Chaplain Corps of the U.S. Navy and served in Hawaii and Tennessee while on active duty. He also participated in several overseas deployments including Operation Desert Shield, Operation Desert Storm, and Operation Southern Watch. After naval chaplaincy, he served as associate rector at St Luke's Church in Jackson, Tennessee, from 1998 until 2003 and then rector of St Paul's Church in Flint, Michigan.

== Episcopacy ==
Field was elected the 8th bishop of West Missouri on November 6, 2010. He was ordained and consecrated as bishop on March 6, 2011, by Presiding Bishop Katharine Jefferts Schori. On Holy Cross Day, 2021 Bishop Field resigned from his ministry as the eighth Bishop of West Missouri. In 2022 he became interim rector of St Luke's Church in Worcester, Massachusetts. He married Donna Jean Cassarino on August 4, 1979, and the couple has two children: Chandra and Christopher.

== See also ==
- List of Episcopal bishops of the United States
- Historical list of the Episcopal bishops of the United States
