= St. John Chrysostom Church (Delafield, Wisconsin) =

Historic church in Wisconsin, United States

- U.S. National Register of Historic Places
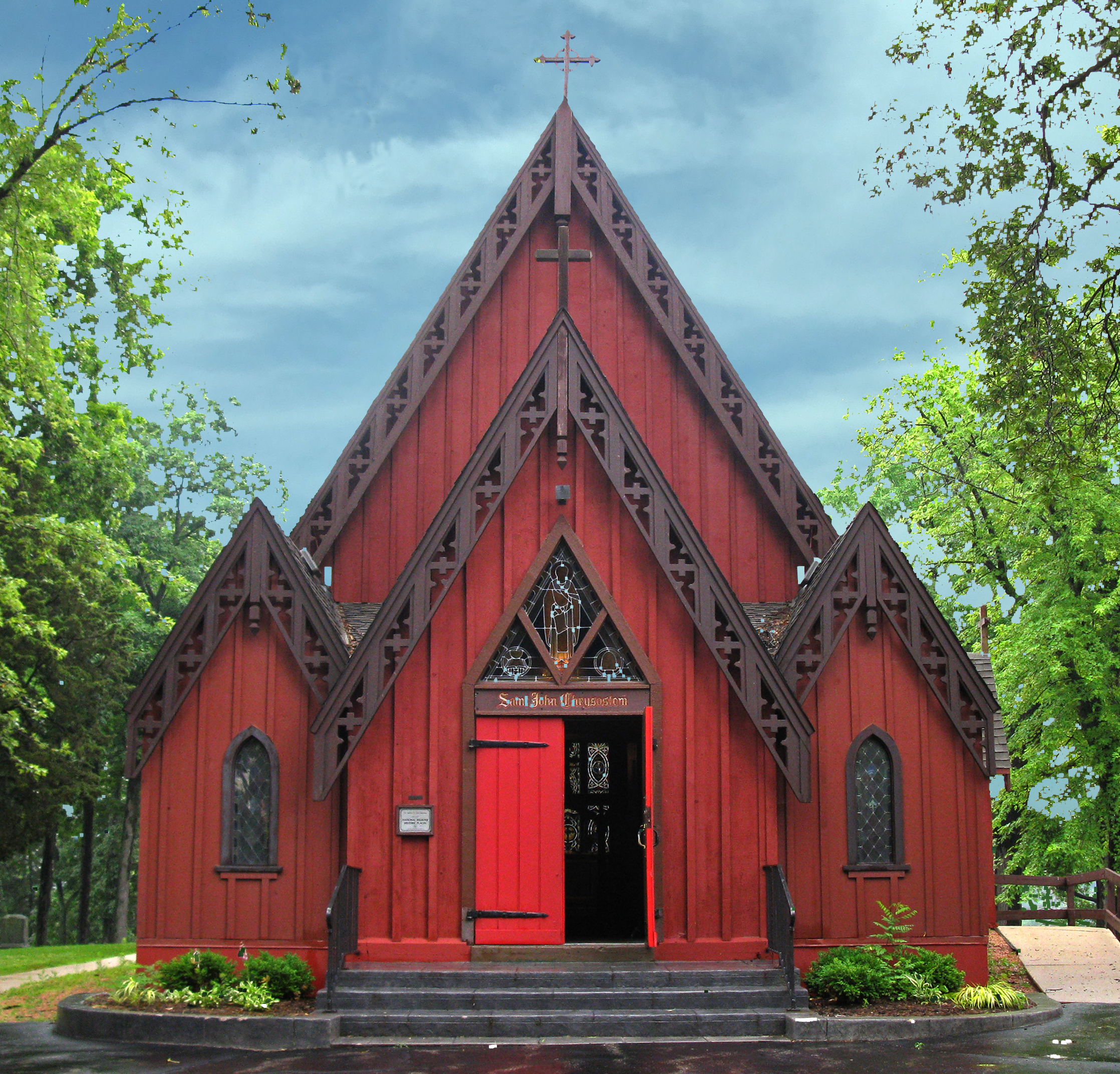

- Location within Wisconsin Location within the United States
- Location: 1111 Genesee St., Delafield, Wisconsin
- Coordinates: 43°3′49″N 88°24′19″W
- Area: 0.5 acres (0.20 ha)
- Built: 1853
- Architect: Richard M. Upjohn
- Architectural style: Carpenter Gothic
- NRHP reference No.: 72000069
- Added to NRHP: February 23, 1972

St. John Chrysostom Church, also known as the Episcopal Church of St. John Chrysostom and the Little Red Church on the Hill, is a wooden Episcopal church built in 1852 in Delafield, Waukesha County, Wisconsin. In 1972 it was listed on the National Register of Historic Places.

St. John's is an active parish in the Episcopal Diocese of Milwaukee. Its current rector is the Rev. Philip J. Cunningham. In 2020, it reported 95 members and 88 average attendance, with $112,495 plate and pledge. In 2024, it reported 74 Average Sunday Attendance and $151,118 in plate and pledge income.

== Background ==
St John's was built from 1851 to 1853, a wooden structure with Gothic Revival style typified in the vertical emphasis and the pointed arches on the openings. Local tradition holds that Robert Ralston Cox, a founder of the congregation, designed the church, but Richard Perrin, an architectural historian, argues that the design is based on one from Richard Upjohn's book Upjohn's Rural Architecture: Designs, Working Drawings, and Specifications for Wooden Church, and other Rural Structures. Perrin observes that the shape and size of the main structure, the location of pulpit, organ and choir stalls inside, the triple window, and the detail of the interior woodwork are all very close to Upjohn's design. The only major difference is that Upjohn included a tower on the church, whereas St. John's has the bell house as a freestanding structure. Some of the ornamental detail also was added by local craftsmen. Carpenter Alden Kelly added the bargeboards with incised designs and the rood screen inside the church. Blacksmith Jacob Luther forged the wrought-iron hinges to suggest tree branches.

James DeKoven served as the parish's first rector from 1855 until 1859. Bishop Jackson Kemper consecrated the building on May 20, 1856. On February 23, 1972, the building was added to the National Register of Historic Places.

Notable previous clergy include Arthur Anton Vogel, fifth bishop of the Episcopal Diocese of West Missouri, who served as rector from 1953 to 1957.
