= John Buchanan (bishop) =

American bishop (1933–2020)

The Right Reverend John Clark Buchanan
- Bishop of West Missouri
- Church: Episcopal Church
- Diocese: West Missouri
- Elected: October 22, 1988
- In office: 1989-1999
- Predecessor: Arthur A. Vogel
- Successor: Barry Robert Howe
- Other posts: Assistant Bishop of Texas (2004-2006); Assistant Bishop of Southern Virginia (2006-2009); Provisional Bishop of Quincy (2009-2013); Assisting Bishop of Chicago (2013-2014)
- Previous post: Coadjutor Bishop of West Missouri (1989)

Orders
- Ordination: 1969 (deacon); January 1, 1970 (priest) by Gray Temple
- Consecration: February 25, 1989 by Edmond L. Browning

Personal details
- Born: May 6, 1933 Joanna, South Carolina, United States
- Died: April 20, 2020 (aged 86) Charleston, South Carolina, United States
- Denomination: Anglican
- Parents: Dock Jones Buchanan & Ella Virginia Clark
- Spouse: Peggy Annelle Brown (m. 1964)
- Children: 2

John Clark Buchanan (May 6, 1933 – April 15, 2020) was an American bishop. He was the sixth bishop of the Episcopal Diocese of West Missouri.

== Early life and education ==
Buchanan was born on May 6, 1933, in Joanna, South Carolina to Dock Jones Buchanan and Ella Virginia Clark. He served in the U.S. Air Force between 1951 and 1955 before attending the University of South Carolina from where he graduated with a Bachelor of Arts in 1958 and a Juris Doctor in 1961. He then practiced law and worked in the insurance industry until 1966 when he enrolled at the General Theological Seminary to study for the priesthood. He graduated with a Master of Divinity in 1969. He also completed a Doctor of Ministry at the McCormick Theological Seminary in Chicago in 1975. He was also awarded an honorary Doctor of Divinity by the General Theological Seminary in 1990.

== Ordained ministry ==
Buchanan was ordained deacon in 1969 and priest on January 1, 1970, by the Bishop of South Carolina Gray Temple. He served as vicar of St Barnabas' Church in Dillon, South Carolina between 1969 and 1971, before becoming rector of St Matthew's Church in Darlington, South Carolina. In 1975 he then became rector of St Andrew's Church in Mount Pleasant, South Carolina, where he remained until 1989.

== Episcopacy ==
During a special convention of the Diocese of West Missouri on October 22, 1988, Buchanan was elected Coadjutor Bishop of West Missouri. He was consecrated on February 25, 1989, in Grace and Holy Trinity Cathedral and succeeded as diocesan bishop on July 1, 1989. He resigned on December 31, 1999, and then returned to his native state of South Carolina where he served at St Michael's Church in Charleston, South Carolina. After a while he became Bishop-in-Residence of the Diocese of Texas. In 2006 he was appointed Assistant Bishop of Southern Virginia while in 2009, Buchanan became the provisional bishop of the Episcopal Diocese of Quincy after a majority of the diocese left for the Anglican Church in North America. He maintained this role until Quincy was merged into the Episcopal Diocese of Chicago. He then served a year as an assisting bishop in Chicago before retiring. He died on April 15, 2020, at his home in Charleston, South Carolina. He married Peggy Annelle Brown in 1964 and together had two daughters.
