= Sunfire =

Sunfire may refer to:

- Sunfire (character), a superhero character in Marvel Comics
- Sunfire (Exiles), a superheroine character from the Marvel Comics series Exiles
- Sunfire (horse), an American Thoroughbred racehorse
- Pontiac Sunfire, an automobile manufactured by General Motors
- Asüna Sunfire, an automobile manufactured by Isuzu
- Sunfire (series), a series of young adult novels
- Sun Fire, brand of server computers introduced by Sun Microsystems in 2001
