= Sidney Catlin Partridge =

The Right Reverend Sidney Catlin Partridge
- Bishop of West Missouri
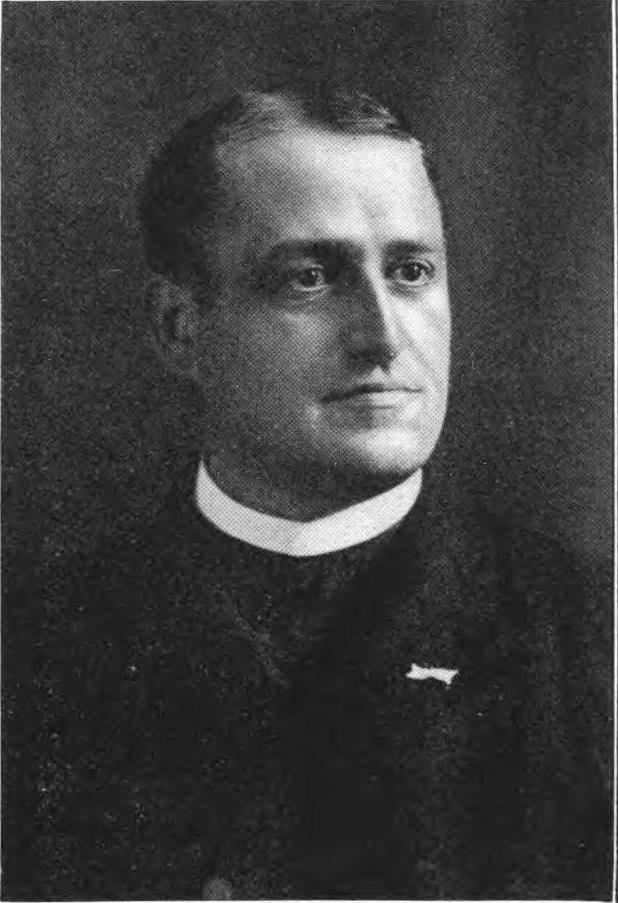
- Church: Episcopal Church
- Diocese: West Missouri
- Elected: 1911
- In office: 1911-1930
- Predecessor: Edward Robert Atwill
- Successor: Robert Nelson Spencer
- Previous post: Bishop of Kyoto (1900-1911)

Orders
- Ordination: 1885 by William Jones Boone
- Consecration: February 2, 1900 by John McKim

Personal details
- Born: September 1, 1857 New York City, New York, U.S.
- Died: June 22, 1930 (aged 72) Kansas City, Missouri, U.S.
- Buried: Forest Hill Calvary Cemetery; Kansas City, Missouri, U.S.
- Denomination: Anglican
- Parents: George Sidney Partridge & Helen Derby Catlin
- Spouse: Charlotte Irene Mills (m. 1884; died 1886) Agnes Laura Louise Simpson (m. 1901)
- Children: Helen Louise Chapin; Amalia Ortwed Lucy Lymon
- Education: Berkeley Divinity School; Yale Divinity School; Yale University

Sidney Catlin Partridge (September 1, 1857 – June 22, 1930) was the first Bishop of Kyoto (1900–1911) and the second Bishop of the Episcopal Diocese of West Missouri (1911–1930).

== Early life and education ==
Partridge was born in New York City on September 1, 1857, to George Sidney Partridge and Helen Derby Catlin. He graduated from Yale in 1880, where he served on the eighth editorial board of The Yale Record and was a member of Skull and Bones. He then undertook studies at Berkeley Divinity School and graduated in 1884.

== Ordained ministry ==
John Williams, Bishop of Connecticut, ordained Partridge to the diaconate on June 4, 1884, at the Church of the Holy Trinity in Middletown, Connecticut. The Reverend Partridge married Charlotte Irene Mills (1857-1886) on Tuesday, June 10, 1884, in Brooklyn, New York. He then worked as a missionary in China under Bishop William Jones Boone, Jr. who ordained him a priest in 1885. Between 1884 and 1887 he served as an instructor in natural science at St John's Missionary College in Shanghai and was treasurer of the mission. He then was in charge of Bishop Boone Memorial School in Wuchang until 1899 where he taught Chinese and English. In 1886, Charlotte Irene Mills Partridge died of typhoid fever. Their daughter, Helen Louise Partridge (1885-1963) was sent to live with her paternal grandmother in the United States, while Partridge continued his mission work in China. He was also involved in teaching bible studies at St Peter's Divinity School.

== Bishop ==
In January 1900, Partridge was elected as the first Missionary Bishop of Kyoto in Japan, and was consecrated on February 2, 1900, in Trinity Cathedral, Tokyo by the Bishop of Tokyo John McKim. Other bishops in attendance included:

- William Awdry, Bishop of South Tokyo
- Hugh James Foss, Bishop of Osaka
- Philip Kemball Fyson, Bishop of Hokkaido
- Frederick Rogers Graves, Bishop of Shanghai
- John McKim, Bishop of North Tokyo

He was decorated as a Knight of the Order of the Dannebrog following his marriage to Agnes Laura Louisa Simpson (1877-1954), the daughter of the Danish consul general at San Francisco on November 27, 1901. She was the daughter of Captain John Simpson (1840-1905) and Amalia Barbara Jeanette Ortved Simpson (1851-1921). In 1911, he was elected Bishop of West Missouri and was enthroned in Grace Church, now Grace and Holy Trinity Cathedral, on June 27, 1911. He was a bishop associate of the American Branch of the Confraternity of the Blessed Sacrament. On June 12, 1928, Rev. Partridge offered the invocation at the opening of the 1928 Republican National Convention in Kansas City.

He died in Kansas City, Missouri, due to double lobar pneumonia. He was buried in Forest Hill Calvary Cemetery in Kansas City, Missouri.
