= Barry Robert Howe =

American bishop

The Right Reverend Barry Robert Howe
- Bishop of West Missouri
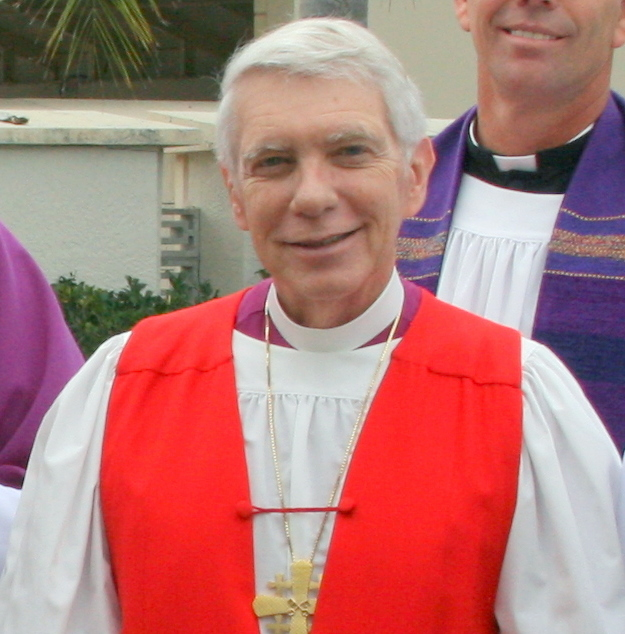
- Church: Episcopal Church
- Diocese: West Missouri
- Elected: September 13, 1997
- In office: 1999-2011
- Predecessor: John Buchanan
- Successor: Martin Scott Field
- Previous post: Coadjutor Bishop of West Missouri (1998-1999)

Orders
- Ordination: January 13, 1968 by Robert L. DeWitt
- Consecration: March 14, 1998 by Frank Griswold

Personal details
- Born: Norristown, Pennsylvania, United States
- Denomination: Anglican
- Spouse: Mary Ballard Howe (m. 1965)
- Children: 2

Barry Robert Howe was bishop of the Episcopal Diocese of West Missouri, serving from 1999 to 2011.

== Early life and education ==
Howe was born in Norristown, Pennsylvania. He studied at Gettysburg College and graduated in 1964 before commencing studies at the former Philadelphia Divinity School. He then graduated with a Master of Divinity in 1967. He also earned a Doctor of Ministry and later a Doctor of Divinity from the University of the South.

== Ordained ministry ==
Howe was ordained deacon in 1967 and priest on January 13, 1968 by Bishop Robert L. DeWitt of Pennsylvania. He initially served as curate at St David's Church in Devon, Pennsylvania until 1971 when he became an associate priest at St Boniface's Church in Sarasota, Florida. In 1973 he was appointed canon pastor at St Luke's Cathedral in Orlando, Florida while in 1978 he accepted the rectorship of St Richard's Church in Winter Park, Florida. Between 1983 and 1987 he was rector of Christ Church in South Hamilton, Massachusetts and then became the Dean of St Peter's Cathedral in St. Petersburg, Florida.

== Bishop ==
On September 13, 1997, Howe was elected as the Coadjutor bishop of West Missouri on the fourth ballot. He was consecrated bishop on March 14, 1998 at the Redemptorist Church in Kansas City, Missouri with Presiding Bishop Frank Griswold as primary consecrator. He succeeded as diocesan bishop on December 31, 1999 and was enthroned at Grace and Holy Trinity Cathedral on January 8, 2000. He remained in office until his retirement in 2011. Since then he has been assistant bishop in the Episcopal Diocese of Southwest Florida.

== See also ==
- List of Episcopal bishops of the United States
- Historical list of the Episcopal bishops of the United States
