= Shay Craig =

American bishop

Shay Craig is an American Episcopal bishop currently serving as the 12th Bishop of North Dakota, having previously been dean of Christ Cathedral in Salina, Kansas.

== Early life and education ==
Craig was born in Omaha, Nebraska, to the writer Mary Francis Shura (née Young) and her second husband, Raymond C. Craig, and grew up in California, near San Francisco, where she attended a Quaker boarding school. She earned a Bachelor’s degree in English from the University of Illinois Urbana-Champaign and a Master's degree in theological studies, specializing in the Hebrew Bible, from Garrett-Evangelical Theological Seminary in Evanston, Illinois.

== Career ==
Craig was a member of the vestry and a Sunday school teacher at Christ Church in Winnetka, Illinois, when she felt a call to ordained ministry. Prior to ordination, she worked as a development officer for the Episcopal Diocese of Chicago. After being ordained as a priest in 2018, she was a canon of Christ Cathedral in Salina, Kansas, from 2018 to 2020. She then served as vicar of St. Michael’s and St. Andrew’s churches in Hays, Kansas, before returning to Salina in 2023 as dean of Christ Cathedral.

On October 25, 2025, Craig was elected to serve as the 12th Bishop of North Dakota, succeeding the Provisional Bishop, Brian J. Thom. Her consecration took place at Gethsemane Cathedral in Fargo on March 14, 2026 in the presence of ten American and Canadian bishops, including the Presiding Bishop of the Episcopal Church of America, Sean Rowe.

== Family ==
Craig is married to John Houston, a lawyer, with whom she has four children.

Her half-sister, Minka Sprague, was an Episcopal priest and her aunt, Judith Craig, was a bishop in the United Methodist Church.
