= Edward R. Welles II =

American bishop (1907–1991)

The Right Reverend Edward Randolph Welles II
- Bishop of West Missouri
- Church: Episcopal Church
- Diocese: West Missouri
- Elected: December 6, 1949
- In office: 1950-1972
- Predecessor: Robert Nelson Spencer
- Successor: Arthur A. Vogel

Orders
- Ordination: April 1931 (deacon); October 1931 (priest) by Paul Matthews
- Consecration: April 19, 1950 by Henry Knox Sherrill

Personal details
- Born: April 20, 1907 Cincinnati, Ohio, United States
- Died: April 15, 1991 (aged 83) Kansas City, Missouri, United States
- Denomination: Anglican
- Parents: Samuel Gardner Welles & Mabel De Geer
- Spouse: Catharine Van Alstyne (m. 1931; died 1983) Martha Borland Willis (m. 1984; died 1984) Ferne Bingham Malcolm (m. 1984)
- Children: 4

Edward Randolph Welles II (April 20, 1907 – April 15, 1991) was the fourth bishop of the Episcopal Diocese of West Missouri, serving from 1950 to 1972.

== Early life and education ==
Welles was born on April 20, 1907, in Cincinnati, Ohio, the son of the Reverend Samuel Gardner Welles and Mabel De Geer. His grandfather was the Bishop of Milwaukee Edward R. Welles. He was educated at Kent School and later studied at Princeton University from where he graduated with a Bachelor of Arts in 1928. He then undertook studies at the University of Oxford from where he earned a Bachelor of Arts in 1930, and a Master of Arts in 1934. He also attended the General Theological Seminary from where he graduated with a Bachelor of Sacred Theology in 1932. He was awarded a Doctor of Sacred Theology from General in 1950, and a Doctor of Divinity from Nashotah House and Missouri Valley College, respectively and both in 1950.

== Ordained ministry ==
Welles was ordained as a deacon in April 1931 and as a priest in October 1931 by Bishop of New Jersey Paul Matthews. He served as the rector of Trinity Church in Woodbridge, New Jersey, between 1931 and 1934. He was also the chaplain at St Mark's School in Southborough, Massachusetts, from 1934 until 1936. He then was elected dean of All Saints Cathedral in Albany and in 1940 became rector of Christ Church in Alexandria, Virginia. In 1944, he was then elected as the dean of St Paul's Cathedral in Buffalo, New York, where he remained until 1950.

== Bishop ==
On December 6, 1949, Welles was elected as the fourth Bishop of West Missouri and was consecrated on April 19, 1950, in Grace and Holy Trinity Cathedral by Presiding Bishop Henry Knox Sherrill. During his episcopacy the number of communicants in his diocese increased, and 12 new congregations were created. He was president of the board directors at Saint Luke's Hospital in Kansas City, Missouri, between 1950 and 1969, and then chairman of the Board from 1969 until 1972. He retired as Bishop of West Missouri in 1972. Between 1973 and 1990, he served as Assistant Bishop in Maine. He died quietly in his sleep on April 15, 1991, at his home in Kansas City, Missouri.

He was a pioneer for supporting the ordination of women. It was in 1974, that he joined two other retired bishops in the first ordination of female priests in The Episcopal Church.

== Family ==
Welles married three times. First to Catharine Van Alstyne on June 2, 1931, who died in 1983, and had four children. He then married Martha Borland Willis on January 23, 1984, but who died shortly after in April 1984. Finally he married Ferne Bingham Malcolm on November 2, 1984.
