= Richard R. Emery =

American bishop

The Right Reverend Richard Runkel Emery D.D.
- Bishop of North Dakota
- Church: Episcopal Church
- Diocese: North Dakota
- In office: 1951–1964
- Predecessor: Douglass H. Atwill
- Successor: George T. Masuda

Orders
- Ordination: December 1937 by Stephen Keeler
- Consecration: May 15, 1951 by Henry Knox Sherrill

Personal details
- Born: November 25, 1910 Pine Island, Minnesota, United States
- Died: February 23, 1964 (aged 53) Grand Forks, North Dakota, United States
- Buried: Lakewood Cemetery
- Denomination: Anglican
- Parents: Hiram Fifield Emery & Della Runkel
- Spouse: Alice Marian Phelps (m. 1941)
- Children: 2
- Education: University of Minnesota; Seabury-Western Theological Seminary

Richard Runkel Emery (November 25, 1910 - February 23, 1964) was bishop of the Episcopal Diocese of North Dakota from 1951 to 1964.

== Early life and education ==
Emery was born on November 25, 1910, in Pine Island, Minnesota, the son of Hiram Fifield Emery and Della Runkel. He was educated at the public schools of Pine Island, and then at the High School in St. Paul, Minnesota. He attended the University of Minnesota and graduated with a Bachelor of Arts in 1934. He also studied at the Seabury-Western Theological Seminary, graduating with a Bachelor of Sacred Theology in 1937, a Master of Sacred Theology in 1943, and a Doctor of Divinity in 1951.

== Ordained ministry ==
Emery was ordained deacon in February 1937 by Bishop Frank McElwain of Minnesota, and priest in December 1937 by Bishop Stephen Keeler, Coadjutor of Minnesota. He served as minister-in-charge of the Church of the Good Shepherd in Windom, Minnesota in 1937, before transferring to St John's Church in Worthington, Minnesota that same year. In 1942, he became rector of the Church of Christ in Albert Lea, Minnesota, and in 1948 rector of St Paul's Church in Minneapolis.

== Bishop ==
After being elected Missionary Bishop of North Dakota, Emery was consecrated on May 15, 1951, with Presiding Bishop Henry Knox Sherrill as chief consecrator.

== Death ==
While riding in a station wagon on February 23, 1964, Bishop Emery, and four other were killed when a passenger train hit their wagon at a railroad crossing. The accident took place in Grand Forks, North Dakota. The funeral service was held on February 26, 1964, at Gethsemane Cathedral in Fargo, North Dakota. He was buried in Lakewood Cemetery.
