= Amy Dafler Meaux =

American bishop

Amy Dafler Meaux is an American Episcopal bishop currently serving as the 9th Bishop of West Missouri, having previously been dean and rector of Trinity Episcopal Cathedral in Little Rock, Arkansas.

== Education ==
Dafler Meaux studied at Louisiana Scholars' College (part of Northwestern State University) before obtaining a Master of Divinity degree from the Seminary of the Southwest in 2002.

== Career ==
Dafler Meaux served in parishes in New Orleans (Louisiana), Dallas (Texas) and Danville (Kentucky) before being appointed dean and rector of Trinity Episcopal Cathedral in Little Rock, Arkansas, in 2020.

On November 9, 2024, she was elected to serve as the 9th Bishop of West Missouri, succeeding Diane Jardine Bruce. On May 3, 2025, she was consecrated with the Presiding Bishop of the Episcopal Church Sean Rowe as chief consecrator, at Grace and Holy Trinity Cathedral in Kansas City.

== Family ==
Dafler Meaux and her husband Jared are the parents of three children.
