= St. John's Episcopal Church (Springfield, Missouri) =

St John's Episcopal Church, Springfield, Missouri
- St John's Episcopal Church, Springfield, Missouri
- 37.2263°N 93.2866°W
- Denomination: Episcopal Church
- Churchmanship: High Church, Anglo-Catholic
- Website: https://stjohnsspringfield.diowestmo.org/

History
- Dedication: St John

Administration
- Province: VII
- Diocese: West Missouri
- Deanery: Southern
- Parish: St. John's, Springfield, Missouri

Clergy
- Rector: The Rev'd Benjamin W. George-Thoms

St. John's Episcopal Church, built in 1888, is an historic church located at 515 East Division Street in Springfield, Missouri. It is listed on the city of Springfield's register of historic sites.

== History ==
In 1881, a small but dedicated number of Christ Church members recognized the need for a second Episcopal parish in Springfield. A location was selected, and on March 19, 1886, the organizational meeting was held. A six-member vestry was elected, a plan for financial support was developed, and application was made for a Certification of Incorporation. The building was completed in 1888 and the first liturgy was celebrated on September 23 with 123 communicant members present.

On May 1, 1978, the church was presented a plaque designating it as an historical site.
