= Sunfire (series) =

Series of romance novels

- Author: Vivian Schurfranz, Jane Claypool Miner, Candice F. Ransom, Mary Francis Shura, Jeffie Ross Gordon, and Willo Davis Roberts
- Genre: Young adult historical romance
- Publisher: Scholastic Books
- No. of books: 32

Sunfire is a series of young adult historical romance novels published by Scholastic Books in the 1980s. They are currently out of print.

== Background ==
The books were written by a group of authors, including Vivian Schurfranz (9), Jane Claypool Miner (6), Candice F. Ransom (6), Mary Francis Shura (6), Jeffie Ross Gordon (2), and Willo Davis Roberts (3).

== Structure of the novels ==
The Sunfire books contained two themes: history and romance. Each book featured a teenage girl who experienced a particular period or event in American history. At the same time, with very few exceptions, the girl was torn between two potential lovers. The girl was typically ahead of her time in ideas and actions and the suitor she almost always chose was the one who approved of or accepted her actions. The cover art always featured the main character flanked by her two potential lovers, along with scenes from the historical event or period that was the setting for the book.

== Series ==
Titles in the Sunfire series listed in order of publication
#	Title	Author	Setting	Ref
1	Amanda	Candice F. Ransom	1846; Oregon Trail	
2	Susannah	Candice F. Ransom	1864; American Civil War	
3	Elizabeth	Willo Davis Roberts	1692; Salem Witch Trials	
4	Danielle	Vivian Schurfranz	1814; War of 1812	
5	Joanna	Jane Claypool Miner	1836; Lowell, Massachusetts textile mills.	
6	Jessica	Mary Francis Shura	1873; Kansas.	
7	Caroline	Willo Davis Roberts	1852; California Gold Rush.	
8	Kathleen	Candice F. Ransom	1847; Great Famine and Irish immigration to the USA.	
9	Marilee	Mary Francis Shura	1622; Jamestown Colony.	
10	Laura	Vivian Schurfranz	1918; World War I, the suffrage movement, and the 1918 influenza pandemic.	
11	Emily	Candice F. Ransom	1900; high society in the Gilded Age.	
12	Jacquelyn	Jeffie Ross Gordon	1931; the Great Depression.	
13	Victoria	Willo Davis Roberts	1835; the Texas Revolution.	
14	Cassie	Vivian Schurfranz	1755; Iroquois Confederacy during the French and Indian War.	
15	Roxanne	Jane Claypool Miner	1938; the Golden Age of Hollywood.	
16	Megan	Vivian Schurfranz	1867; the Alaska Purchase.	
17	Sabrina	Candice F. Ransom	1780; the American Revolutionary War.	
18	Veronica	Jane Claypool Miner	1941; the Attack on Pearl Harbor and World War II.	
19	Nicole	Candice F. Ransom	1912; Sinking of the RMS Titanic.	
20	Julie	Vivian Schurfranz	1868; building of the transcontinental railroad, including the "Last Spike" ceremony.	
21	Rachel	Vivian Schurfranz	1910; the Central European migration to the USA and includes the Triangle Shirtwaist Factory fire.	
22	Corey	Jane Claypool Miner	1864; American Civil War.	
23	Heather	Vivian Schurfranz	1665; the beginning of New York City.	
24	Gabrielle	Mary Francis Shura	1880; on a Mississippi showboat.	
25	Merrie	Vivian Schurfranz	1620; Plymouth Colony	
26	Nora	Jeffie Ross Gordon	1906; 1906 San Francisco earthquake.	
27	Margaret	Jane Claypool Miner	1886; A midwestern one-room schoolhouse.	
28	Josie	Vivian Schurfranz	1861; the 18-month run of the Pony Express.	
29	Diana	Mary Francis Shura	1803; Louisiana Purchase and the Lewis and Clark Expedition.	
30	Renee	Vivian Schurfranz	1888; Great Blizzard of 1888.	
31	Jennie	Jane Claypool Miner	1889; Johnstown Flood.	
32	Darcy	Mary Francis Shura	1900; 1900 Galveston hurricane.	

== Reception ==
A review by Catherine Bowles, in the journal Children's Book and Media Review of the first 4 books in the series, found the books under researched, formulaic and "of mediocre quality". On the other hand Joyce A. Litton, while conceding that the novels were formulaic, called the series an "ecelent set of historical novels".
