= Arthur A. Vogel =

American author and prelate

The Right Reverend Arthur Anton Vogel
- Bishop of West Missouri
- Church: Episcopal Church
- Diocese: West Missouri
- Elected: December 6, 1970
- In office: 1973-1989
- Predecessor: Edward R. Welles II
- Successor: John Buchanan
- Previous post: Coadjutor Bishop of West Missouri (1971-1972)

Orders
- Ordination: February 1946 (deacon); February 1948 (priest) by Benjamin F. P. Ivins
- Consecration: May 25, 1971 by John E. Hines

Personal details
- Born: February 24, 1924 Cincinnati, Ohio, United States
- Died: March 6, 2012 (aged 88) Kansas City, Missouri, United States
- Buried: Nashotah House
- Denomination: Anglican
- Parents: Arthur Louis Vogel & Gladys Eirene Larson
- Spouse: Katharine Louise Nunn (m. 1947)
- Children: 3

Arthur Anton Vogel (February 24, 1924 – March 6, 2012) was an American author and prelate who was the fifth bishop of the Episcopal Diocese of West Missouri.

== Biography ==
Vogel was born in Milwaukee, Wisconsin, on February 24, 1924, son of Arthur Louis Vogel and Gladys Eirene Larson. He was educated at the University of the South between 1942 and 1943 and Carroll University in Waukesha, WI from 1943 until 1944. He then studied at Nashotah House Theological Seminary, and graduated with a Bachelor of Divinity in 1946. Later he also attended the University of Chicago, where he earned a Master of Arts in 1948. He also graduated with a Doctor of Philosophy from Harvard University in 1952. He was also awarded a number of honorary doctorates: Doctor of Sacred Theology from General Theological Seminary in 1969; Doctor of Civil Law from Nashotah House in 1969; and a Doctor of Divinity from the University of the South in 1971.

== Ordained ministry ==
Vogel was ordained deacon in February 1946 and priest in February 1948 by Bishop Benjamin F. P. Ivins of Milwaukee. He served his diaconate and initial months as a priest as curate at St Mark's Church in Milwaukee, until he became a teaching assistant of philosophy at Harvard University in 1949. In 1950 he became an instructor at Trinity College and retained the post until his appointment as rector of St John Chrysostom Church in Delafield, Wisconsin, where he remained until 1957. Concurrent with this position, he was Professor of Philosophical and Systematic Theology at Nashotah House from 1952 to 1971. He was also sub-dean of Nashotah House from 1964 until 1971.

== Episcopacy ==
At a special election held on December 6, 1970, Vogel was elected Coadjutor Bishop of the Diocese of West Missouri on the first ballot. He was consecrated by Presiding Bishop John E. Hines on May 25, 1971. On January 1, 1973, he succeeded as diocesan bishop and remained in office until his retirement in 1989. During his ministry as a priest, and later as bishop, he was involved in the Anglican-Roman Catholic Consultation and worked tirelessly for ecumenism. Vogel died on March 6, 2012, in Kansas City, Missouri.

On August 16, 1976, Vogel offered the invocation at the opening of the 1976 Republican National Convention in Kansas City, Missouri.

== Publications (selected) ==
- 1959: Reality, Reason and Religion. New York: Longmans
- 1963: The Christian Person. New York: Seabury Press
- 1966: The next Christian epoch. New York: Harper & Row
- 1968: Is the Last Supper finished? secular light on a sacred meal. New York: Sheed and Ward
- 1973: Body theology; God's presence in man's world. New York: Harper & Row
- 1976: The Power of His Resurrection: the mystical life of Christians. New York: Seabury Press
- 1982: Jesus Prayer for Today. New Jersey: Paulist
- 1984 (as editor): Theology in Anglicanism, "The Anglican Studies Series". Wilton, Connecticut: Morehouse Barlow
- 1989: I Know God Better Than I Know Myself. New York: Bloomsbury
- 1992: Christ in His Time and Ours. New York: Sheed and Ward
- 1995: God, Prayer, and Healing: Living With God in a World Like Ours. Michigan: Eerdmans
- 1995: Radical Christianity and the Flesh of Jesus. Michigan: Eerdmans
