= Mary Francis Shura =

American novelist

- Born: Mary Francis Young; February 23, 1923; Pratt, Kansas, United States
- Died: January 12, 1991 (aged 67); Maywood, Illinois, United States
- Occupation: Novelist
- Spouse(s): Daniel Charles Shura (1943-1959), Raymond C. Craig (1961-divorced)
- Children: 4, including Shay Craig
- Writing career
- Pen name: Mary Francis Shura, Mary Craig, Alexis Hill, M. S. Craig, Mary Shura Craig, Meredith Hill, M. F. Craig, Mary S. Craig
- Language: English
- Period: 1960–1990
- Genres: Children, young adult romance, romance, gothic, suspense

Mary Francis Shura Craig (née Young; 23 February 1923 – 12 January 1991) was an American writer of over 50 novels from 1960 to 1990. She wrote children's adventures and young adult romances as Mary Francis Shura, M. F. Craig, and Meredith Hill; gothic novels as Mary Craig; romance novels as Alexis Hill, Mary Shura Craig and Mary S. Craig; and suspense novels as M. S. Craig.

She was a recipient of the Carl Sandburg Literary Arts Award in 1985, and was elected president of the Mystery Writers of America in 1990.

== Biography ==
Born Mary Francis Young on 23 February 1923 in Pratt, Kansas, she was the daughter of Jackson Fant Young and Mary Francis Milstead.

On 24 October 1943, she married Daniel Charles Shura, with whom she had three children: Marianne Francis Shura (later Sprague), an Episcopal priest; Daniel Charles Shura; and Alice Barrett Shura (later Stout). Following her husband's death in 1959, she married Raymond C. Craig on 8 December 1961. They had one daughter, Shay Craig, currently Bishop of North Dakota, before they divorced.

On 12 January 1991, she died of injuries suffered in a fire in her apartment on 13 December 1990.

== Bibliography ==
Some of her novels were republished under different titles

=== As Mary Francis Shura ===
==== Children's literature ====
===== Single novels =====
- Simple Spigott (1960); Publisher: New York, Alferd A. Knopf.
- The garret of Greta McGraw (1961); Publisher: New York, Knopf.
- Mary's marvelous mouse (1962); Adrienne Adams; Publisher: New York, Knopf.
- The nearsighted knight (1964); Publisher: New York, Knopf.
- Shoefull of shamrock (1965); Publisher: New York : Atheneum.
- Run away home (1965)
- A tale of middle length (1966); Publisher: New York, Atheneum.
- Backwards for luck (1966)
- Pornada (1968)
- The valley of the frost giants (1971)
- The seven stone (1972) aka Maggie in the middle; Dale Payson; Publisher: New York : Scholastic Book Services.
- The shop on Threnody Street (1972)
- Topcat of Tam (1972) aka Top Cat
- The riddle of Raven's Gulch (1975) aka The riddle of Raven Hollow; Publisher: New York : Dodd, Mead.
- The season of silence (1976); Ruth Sanderson; Publisher: New York : Atheneum.
- The gray ghosts of Taylor Ridge (1978); Michael A Hampshire; Publisher: New York : Dodd, Mead.
- The Barkley Street six-pack (1979) aka My Friend Natalie aka Some Kind of Friend; Gene Sparkman; Publisher: New York : Dodd, Mead.
- Mister Wolf and me (1979); Konrad Hack; Publisher: New York : Dodd, Mead
- Happles and cinnamonger (1981); Bertram M Tormey; Publisher: New York : Dodd, Mead.
- The search for Grissi (1985); Ted Lewin; Publisher: New York, N.Y. : Dodd, Mead.
- Tales from Dickens (1985)
- The Josie gambit (1986); Publisher: New York : Dodd, Mead.
- Don't call me Toad! (1987); Jacqueline Rogers; Publisher: New York : Dodd, Mead.
- The Sunday doll (1988); Ted Lewin; Publisher: New York : Dodd, Mead.
- The mystery at Wolf River (1989); Publisher: New York, N.Y. : Scholastic.
- Kate's book (1989); Publisher: New York : Scholastic.
- Kate's house (1990); Publisher: New York : Scholastic.
- Polly panic (1990); Publisher: New York : Putnam, 1990.
- Gentle Annie : the true story of a Civil War nurse (1991); Publisher: New York : Scholastic.
- Our teacher is missing (1992); Publisher: New York : Scholastic.

===== Kids of the Neighborhood series =====
1. Chester the great (1980) aka Chester; Susan Swan; Publisher: New York : Dodd, Mead.
2. Eleanor (1983); Susan Swan; Publisher: New York : Dodd, Mead.
3. Jefferson (1984); Susan Swan; Publisher: New York : Dodd, Mead.

==== Young adult romances ====
===== Sunfire =====
- Jessica (1984); Publisher: New York : Scholastic Inc.
- Marilee (1984); Publisher: New York : Scholastic.
- Marilee (1987); Publisher: New York : Scholastic.
- Diana (1988): Publisher: New York : Scholastic.
- Darcy (1989); Publisher: New York : Scholastic.

===== Other novels =====
- Winter dreams, Christmas love (1992); Publisher: New York : Scholastic.
- Summer dreams, winter love (1993); Publisher: London : Scholastic.

=== As Mary Craig ===
==== Gothic novels ====
- A Candle for the Dragon (1973)
- Ten Thousand Several Doors (1973) aka Mistress of Lost River
- The Cranes of Ibycus (1974) aka Shadows of the Past
- Were He a Stranger (1978)

=== As Alexis Hill ===
==== Riviere Saga (romance) ====
1. Passion's Slave (1979)
2. The Untamed Heart (1980)

=== As M. S. Craig ===
==== Romance novels ====
- Dust to Diamonds: The Chicagoans (1981)

==== Suspense novels ====
- To play the fox (1982); Publisher: New York : Dodd, Mead.
- Gillian's chain (1983); Publisher: New York : Dodd, Mead.
- The third blonde (1985); Publisher: New York : Dodd, Mead.
- Flash point (1987); Publisher: New York, N.Y. : Dodd, Mead.

=== As Mary Shura Craig ===
==== Romance novels ====
- Lyon's Pride (1983)
- Pirate's Landing (1983)
- Fortune's Destiny (1986)

=== As Meredith Hill ===
==== Young adult romances ====
===== Individual novels =====
- The Silent Witness (1983)

===== Chrystal Falls series =====
1. The Wrong Side of Love (1986)
5. A Loss of Innocence (1986)
6. Forbidden Love (1986)

=== As M. F. Craig ===
==== Children's literature ====
- The Mystery at Peacock Place (1986)

=== As Mary S. Craig ===
==== Romance novels ====
- Dark Paradise (1986)
