= Andrew Fairfield =

American Anglican bishop (1943–2020)

The Right Reverend Andy Fairfield
- X Bishop of North Dakota
- Church: Episcopal Church
- See: North Dakota
- In office: 1989–2003
- Predecessor: Harold A. Hopkins Jr.
- Successor: Michael G. Smith

Orders
- Consecration: 1989

Personal details
- Born: May 31, 1943 Northampton, Massachusetts, U.S.
- Died: February 16, 2020 (aged 76) Shutesbury, Massachusetts, U.S.
- Spouse: Sarah Jane McCune (married 1967)

Andrew Hedtler "Andy" Fairfield (May 31, 1943 – February 16, 2020) was an American Anglican bishop.

He was a theological conservative. He served from 1989 to 2003 as the tenth bishop of the Episcopal Diocese of North Dakota in the Episcopal Church.

In a 1996, Bishop Fairfield was the dissent in a 7-to-1 decision to dismiss heresy charges against retired bishop Walter C. Righter.

In 2008, he renounced his ordained ministry in the Episcopal Church. After his retirement, in disagreement with the pro-homosexuality policies of his church, he was translated to the Anglican Church of Uganda, in 2007, and subsequently to the Anglican Church in North America. Until his death, he was assisting bishop in the Anglican Diocese in New England.

== See also ==
- Anglican realignment

Episcopal Church (USA) titles
Preceded by Harold A. Hopkins, Jr.	X Bishop of North Dakota; 1989–2003	Succeeded by Michael Smith
