= Diane Jardine Bruce =

Interim Dean and President, Seminary of the Southwest

The Right Reverend Diane Jardine Bruce
- Interim Dean and President, Seminary of the Southwest
- Church: Episcopal Church
- Previous post: Provisional Bishop of West Missouri (2021-2025)

Orders
- Ordination: January 17, 1998 by Frederick H. Borsch
- Consecration: May 15, 2010 by Katharine Jefferts Schori

Personal details
- Born: Diane M. Jardine; 1956 (age 69–70) Pequannock Township, New Jersey, United States
- Denomination: Anglican (prev. Roman Catholic)
- Spouse: Gregory Stephen Bruce
- Children: 2

Diane M. Jardine Bruce (born June 1956) is currently the Interim Dean and President of Seminary of the Southwest in Austin, TX. She was the Bishop Provisional of the Episcopal Diocese of West Missouri from 2021 to 2025. She previously served as the seventh bishop suffragan of the Episcopal Diocese of Los Angeles.

== Early life and education ==
Diane was born in June 1956 in Pequannock, New Jersey. She was raised as a Roman Catholic. She studied at the University of California, Berkeley and graduated with a Bachelor of Arts in linguistics in 1979. In 1980 she commenced employment with Wells Fargo Bank and subsequently served as vice president, in compensation management, and in analysis. It was in 1986 that she joined the Episcopal Church. She then earned a Master of Divinity from Claremont School of Theology in 1997. She also has a Doctor of Ministry from Seabury-Western Theological Seminary in Congregational Development. She also has two honorary doctorates: One from Seabury Western, one from the Church Divinity School of the Pacific.

== Ordained ministry ==
Diane was ordained deacon on June 7, 1997, by the Assistant Bishop of Los Angeles Robert Marshall Anderson, and then priest on January 17, 1998, by the Bishop of Los Angeles Frederick H. Borsch. Between 1997 and 2000 she was associate rector of the Church of the Messiah in Santa Ana, California where she was responsible for Women’s ministry and youth group. Between 2000 and 2010 she was rector of St Clement’s by-the-Sea Church in San Clemente, California.

== Episcopacy ==
Diane was elected Suffragan Bishop of Los Angeles on December 4, 2009. She was consecrated as a bishop on May 15, 2010 with Presiding Bishop Katharine Jefferts Schori as chief consecrator. She retained the post until her election on November 6, 2021, as the Provisional Bishop of the Diocese of West Missouri by the diocesan convention meeting at Grace and Holy Trinity Cathedral in Kansas City, Missouri. Upon the completion of her ministry in the Diocese of Los Angeles, Bruce took up residence and began her ministry in the Diocese of West Missouri on December 1, 2021, where she served until 2025. On November 14, 2025, the Board of Trustees of Seminary of the Southwest appointed her Interim Dean and President. She was commmissioned in this role on January 28, 2026 in Christ Chapel on the campus of Seminary of the Southwest. She is married to Gregory Stephen Bruce and is the mother of two.

== See also ==
- List of Episcopal bishops of the United States
- Historical list of the Episcopal bishops of the United States
