= James DeKoven =

Episcopal priest and educator (1831–1879)

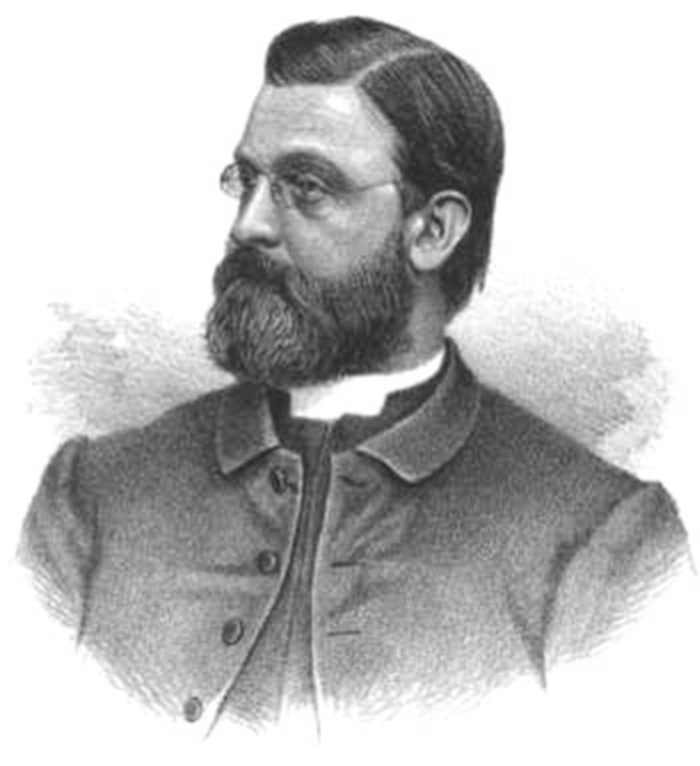

Priest
- Born: September 19, 1831; Middletown, Connecticut, U.S.
- Died: March 19, 1879
- Venerated in: Anglican Communion
- Feast: March 22

James DeKoven (September 19, 1831 – March 19, 1879) was an American priest, educator, and leader of Anglican Ritualism in the Episcopal Church, which commemorates him in Lesser Feasts and Fasts.

== Early life and education ==
DeKoven was born in Middletown, Connecticut to wealthy parents of ten children. He was the uncle of Reginald De Koven. He was educated at Columbia College and General Theological Seminary. In 1854, he was ordained as a deacon.

== Career ==
He accepted a teaching position at Nashotah House in Wisconsin and became rector of the nearby St. John Chrysostom parish in Delafield. It was there that he was ordained as a priest by Bishop Jackson Kemper. While in Delafield, he established a school called St. John's Hall. In 1859 he became the warden of Racine College and continued to be at the center of that school for the rest of his life.

He spoke in support of the cause for ritualism at the National Conventions in 1871 and 1874. DeKoven was nominated several times and even elected as a bishop, but was never ordained to the episcopate. He was nominated or elected as bishop of Massachusetts (1873), Wisconsin (1874), Fond du Lac (1875), and Illinois (1875).

In the Illinois election, he was chosen by the clergy and the laity, but a majority of the standing committee refused to endorse his election. The reason given by the standing committee was his "Doctrine on the Holy Eucharist," an open letter published in the Milwaukee, Wisconsin newspaper on January 14, 1874, was at least partly responsible for his Eucharistic doctrine being questioned. The signers of this letter included three faculty members from Nashotah House. According to his opponents, his views on transubstantiation "were generally understood to approximate more closely to Romanism than the language of the Thirty-Nine Articles admitted." He also addressed the Church Congress (a series of national meetings to provide a vision for the Episcopal Church) in 1876.

DeKoven remained in Wisconsin for the rest of his life, turning down calls to serve at some of the nation's largest and wealthiest parish churches, including Trinity Church in New York City, Church of the Advent in Boston, and St. Mark's Church in Philadelphia.

== Death and legacy ==
After suffering a fall on the ice, De Koven died on Saint Joseph's Day (March 19) in 1879. He is buried on the grounds of Racine College, now the DeKoven Center, in Racine, Wisconsin. In the Calendar of the Church Year, his feast day is March 22.

== Popular culture ==
DeKoven's image is used as a graphic by the rock band Monstrance, which is composed of clergy from the Episcopal Diocese of Milwaukee.
