= Harold A. Hopkins Jr. =

American Episcopal bishop (1930–2019)

The Right Reverend Harold Anthony Hopkins D.D.
- Bishop of North Dakota
- Church: Episcopal Church
- Diocese: North Dakota
- Elected: October 18, 1979
- In office: 1980–1988
- Predecessor: George T. Masuda
- Successor: Andrew Fairfield

Orders
- Ordination: 1955
- Consecration: February 18, 1980 by John Allin

Personal details
- Born: April 24, 1930 Philadelphia, Pennsylvania, United States
- Died: January 3, 2019 (aged 88) Portland, Maine, United States
- Denomination: Anglican
- Parents: Harold Anthony Hopkins & Ellen Sophia Christianson
- Spouse: Nancy Stone Myer (m. 1954; died 2018)
- Children: 6
- Education: University of Pennsylvania; General Theological Seminary

Harold Anthony Hopkins Jr. (April 24, 1930 – January 3, 2019) was ninth bishop of the Episcopal Diocese of North Dakota, serving from 1980 to 1988.

== Early life and education ==
Hopkins was born on April 24, 1930, in Germantown, Philadelphia, Pennsylvania, to the Reverend Harold Anthony Hopkins Sr. and Ellen Sophia Christianson. He was educated at the Germantown Academy, and then at the University of Pennsylvania. He spent two years attending officers training in the US Navy, and then left after two years to study at the General Theological Seminary, graduating in 1955. He was awarded an honorary Doctor of Divinity in 1980 from General Seminary.

== Ordained ministry ==
Hopkins was ordained to the diaconate and the priesthood in the Episcopal Diocese of Pennsylvania in 1955. He served as assistant at Christ Church in Pelham Manor, New York between 1955 and 1957, and then moved to Millinocket, Maine to serve as rector of St Andrew's Church. In 1962, he became rector of St Saviour's Church in Bar Harbor, Maine. In 1969, he was appointed assistant to the Bishop of Maine, a post he retained till 1978 when he became Archdeacon of Maine. He also founded St Bartholomew's Church in Yarmouth, Maine.

== Bishop ==
Hopkins was elected Bishop of North Dakota on October 6, 1979, on the ninth ballot. He was consecrated to the episcopate on February 18, 1980, in the First Lutheran Church in Fargo, North Dakota. He remained in office till his retirement in 1988. After that, he lived in Minneapolis, before moving back to Maine while working in the Office of Pastoral Development of the Episcopal Church. He retired in 1997 and moved to the Piper Shores retirement community in Scarborough, Maine. Hopkins died after a brief illness on January 3, 2019, at the Maine Medical Center in Portland, Maine.

== Bibliography ==
- Nominees in an Episcopal Process (1989)
- The Interval Between Election and Consecration (1992)
- (contributor) Restoring the Soul of a Church (1995)
