= Michael G. Smith =

The Right Reverend Michael Gene Smith
- Bishop of North Dakota
- Church: Episcopal Church
- Diocese: North Dakota
- Elected: February 7, 2004
- In office: 2004–2019
- Predecessor: Andrew Fairfield
- Successor: Keith Whitmore

Orders
- Consecration: May 8, 2004 by Frank Griswold

Personal details
- Born: Michael Gene Smith; September 5, 1955 (age 71) Purcell, Oklahoma, US
- Denomination: Anglican
- Spouse: Lisa White Smith
- Children: 3
- Education: Oklahoma State University; Marymount College; University of Oklahoma; Seabury-Western Theological Seminary

Michael Gene Smith (born September 5, 1955) is an American prelate, who was the eleventh Bishop of North Dakota between 2004 and 2019. He was consecrated on May 8, 2004.

== Early life and education ==
Smith is an enrolled member of the Potawatomi Nation of Oklahoma. He is chair of the Bishops’ Native Collaborative and Chair of the Communion Partner Bishops Advisory Committee.

Smith holds degrees in Psychology, Music, Social Work, and Theology from Oklahoma State University, Marymount College of Kansas, the University of Oklahoma and Seabury-Western Theological Seminary. He is currently pursuing a doctoral degree in preaching through Aquinas Institute of Theology in St. Louis, Missouri.

Prior to becoming bishop of North Dakota, Smith served at Episcopal churches Oklahoma and Minnesota.

Considered a theological conservative, Smith was one of the few Episcopalian American bishops to oppose same-sex marriages. After the General Convention of the Episcopal Church approved rites of marriage for LGBTQ couples in 2015, Smith said that he could not "in good conscience" allow same-sex marriages in his diocese.

== Personal life ==
Smith is married to the Rev. Lisa White Smith, also an Episcopal priest. The couple have three grown children and eight grandchildren.

== See also ==
- List of Episcopal bishops of the United States
- Historical list of the Episcopal bishops of the United States
