= Jamie Attwell =

English footballer

Personal information
- Full name: Jamie Wayne Attwell
- Date of birth: 8 June 1982 (age 44)
- Place of birth: Bristol, England
- Height: 6 ft 5 in (1.96 m)
- Position: Goalkeeper

Youth career
- ?–2001: Tottenham Hotspur

Senior career*
Years	Team	Apps	(Gls)
2001–2002	Bristol City	0	(0)
2002	→ Tiverton Town (loan)	5	(0)
2002	Torquay United	4	(0)
- * Club domestic league appearances and goals

Jamie Wayne Attwell (born 8 June 1982) is an English football goalkeeper. He represented Wales at junior level.

Attwell began his career as a junior with local Bristol sides Shirehampton and St. Vallier, before joining Everton's junior scheme. He failed to settle at Everton and returned to Bristol in March 2001, playing a couple trial games for Bristol City before signing a three-year traineeship with Tottenham Hotspur. Upon his release from Spure having played with Peter Crouch and Ledley King he went on to join Kidderminster Harriers, Bradford City, Salisbury City and Southend United before joining Bristol City in August 2001 as cover for Steve Phillips and Mike Stowell

Hi bid to make the first team fell short with City and he joined Tiverton Town on loan in March 2002, before being released by City at the end of the season.

In July 2002, Attwell was on trial at Tranmere Rovers, but moved to Torquay United later that month.

He made his league debut in place of the injured Kevin Dearden on 17 August 2002 in a 4–3 defeat away to York City. His next game came on 22 October 2002, a 4–0 defeat in the Football League Trophy at home to Wycombe Wanderers, followed 4 days later by a 5–1 defeat away to Scunthorpe United.

He was replaced by first team keeper after the Scunthorpe game, but on 29 October played in the 4–0 home win against AFC Bournemouth, replacing Dearden as a substitute with the game still at 0-0. He made one further appearance for Torquay, on 19 November, as a half-time substitute for Arjan van Heusden in the 2–2 draw at home to Kidderminster Harriers F.C. before being released early the following week. Jamie was not helped by a poor defence who collectively conceded 15 goals in the equivalent of less than four games. Jamie's career finished upon the arrival of his first child.
