= Episcopal Diocese of West Missouri =

Diocese of the Episcopal Church in the United States

Diocese of West Missouri Diœcesis Missouriensis Occidentalis

Location
- Country: United States
- Ecclesiastical province: Province VII
- Coordinates: 39°05′53″N 94°35′22″W

Statistics
- Area: 36,720 sq mi (95,100 km^{2})
- Congregations: 47 (2025)
- Members: 8,112 (2025)

Information
- Denomination: Episcopal Church
- Established: 1889
- Cathedral: Grace and Holy Trinity Cathedral

Current leadership
- Bishop: Amy Dafler Meaux

Map
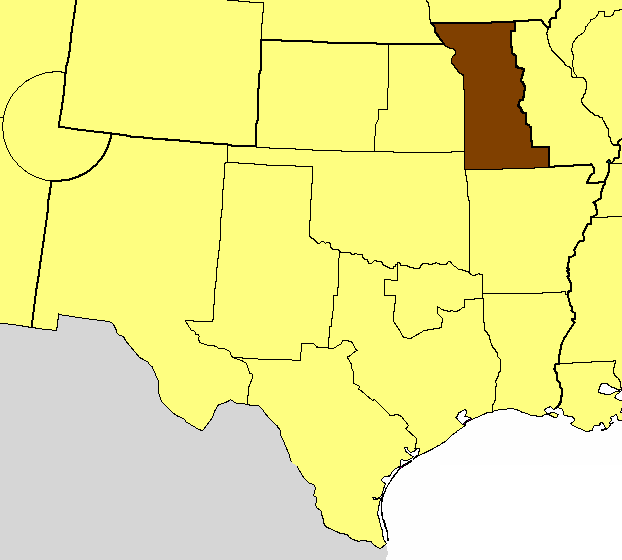
- Location of The Diocese of West Missouri

Website
- diowestmo.org

The Diocese of West Missouri is a diocese of the Episcopal Church in the United States of America and a member of Province VII. It has jurisdiction over sixty counties in western Missouri running from the cities Fairfax in the north to Branson in the south and from Kansas City in the west to Fayette in the east. Its Cathedral and diocesan offices are located in downtown Kansas City. As of 2025 the diocese was made up of 47 parishes and congregations divided into three deaneries.

The diocese reported 9,928 members in 2015 and 8,112 members in 2025. Plate and pledge income for the 47 filing congregations of the diocese in 2025 was $8,786,208. Average Sunday attendance (ASA) in 2025 was 2,344 persons, down from 3,279 in 2015.

== History ==
The diocese traces its roots to the missionary work of Bishop Jackson Kemper who founded churches in the area between 1836 and 1845. In 1841 the churches in the state of Missouri were joined together in the newly founded Diocese of Missouri. Over time the diocese grew to over 90 congregations throughout the state and in 1886 the 50th diocesan convention of the Diocese of Missouri approved a plan to split the diocese in two. On October 15, 1889, The 36th General Convention of the Episcopal Church approved the motion presented by the Diocese of Missouri and the Diocese of West Missouri was born.

The new diocese, originally known as the diocese of Kansas City, was given jurisdiction over 60 counties in the western part of the state covering 36,720 square miles. On June 3, 1890, the new diocese elected its first bishop, the Right Rev. Edward Robert Atwill. Under Atwill the diocese continued to grow and 9 new churches were founded. Bishop Atwill served the Diocese of West Missouri until his death on January 24, 1911.

Following Atwill's death, the diocese elected the Right Rev. Sidney Catlin Partridge, the first bishop of Kyoto, as their second bishop. He was translated to the see of West Missouri and served as its bishop until his death on June 22, 1930, from lobar pneumonia. It was under Partridge's episcopate that Harry S. Truman married his wife Bess at Trinity Episcopal Church in Independence.

In 1930 the diocese elected the Rev. Robert Nelson Spencer to succeed Partridge. Spencer was consecrated a bishop on October 28, 1930. From Bishop Atwill's time the diocese had continued to grow and it was under Bishop Spencer in 1935 that Grace and Holy Trinity Church at 13th and Broadway was designated as the diocese's Cathedral Church. Spencer resigned his ministry as Bishop of West Missouri in 1949.

Spencer was followed as bishop by Edward Randolph Welles II who was elected as bishop on December 6, 1949, and consecrated for that role on April 19, 1950. Under Bishop Welles the diocese continued to grow and 11 churches were founded between 1953 and 1972. Bishop Welles resigned in 1972 and two years later took part in the ordination of the Philadelphia Eleven.

After Welles' retirement the diocese elected Arthur Anton Vogel, a professor at Nashotah House theological seminary, to be its fifth bishop. Vogel authored two books during his tenure as Bishop and delivered the invocation at the 1976 Republican National Convention which met in Kansas City. Vogel retired in 1989 and was succeeded by his Coadjutor, The Rt. Rev. John Clark Buchanan who served the diocese for ten years retiring in 1999. Under Buchanan two more churches were admitted to the diocese.

Buchanan was followed on the diocesan seat by Barry Robert Howe who served as diocesan bishop until his retirement in 2011. Following Howe's retirement the diocesan convention elected the Rev. Martin Scott Field to serve as the 8th Bishop of West Missouri. Field was consecrated on March 6, 2011, by the Most Rev. Katherine Jefferts Schori. On April 8, 2021, following a mediation process outlined by the canons of the Episcopal Church it was announced that Bishop Field would resign his ministry as Bishop on Holy Cross Day, 2021 and that the diocese would begin the process of calling a Bishop Provisional.

On August 3, 2021, the Standing Committee of the diocese announced that their candidate for Bishop Provisional was the Rt. Rev. Diane Jardine Bruce, the 7th Bishop Suffragan of the Diocese of Los Angeles. On Saturday, November 6, 2021, the Convention of the Diocese meeting at Grace and Holy Trinity Cathedral, Kansas City elected Diane Jardine Bruce as Bishop Provisional. She took up residence in the Diocese and began her ministry on December 1, 2021. Bruce is the first woman to lead the diocese as its bishop. She was formally welcomed and seated in the diocesan Cathedra on the Feast of the Epiphany, 2022.

== Bishops of West Missouri ==
	Name	Dates
1st	Edward Robert Atwill	1890–1911
2nd	Sidney Catlin Partridge	1911–1930
3rd	Robert Nelson Spencer	1930–1949
4th	Edward Randolph Welles II	1950–1972
5th	Arthur Anton Vogel	1973–1989
6th	John Clark Buchanan	1989-1999 (Coadjutor Bishop, 1989)
7th	Barry Robert Howe	1999-2011
8th	Martin Scott Field	2011-2021
	Diane Jardine Bruce (provisional)	2021-2025
9th	Amy Dafler Meaux	2025-

=== Suffragan and Assisting Bishops ===
- Robert R. Spears, Jr., Suffragan Bishop 1967-1970 (subsequently Bishop of the Episcopal Diocese of Rochester, 1970–1984)

== Churches ==
Central Deanery	Northwest-Metro Deanery	Southern Deanery
St. Mary Magdalene, Belton	St. Oswald’s, Fairfax	St. Alban’s in the Ozarks, Bolivar
Resurrection, Blue Springs	Good Shepherd, Kansas City	Shepherd of the Hills, Branson
Christ Church, Boonville	Grace & Holy Trinity Cathedral, Kansas City	St. George, Camdenton
Grace Church, Chillicothe	Redeemer, Kansas City	Grace Church, Carthage
St. Paul’s, Clinton	St. Andrew’s, Kansas City	St. Thomas a Becket, Cassville
St. Luke’s, Excelsior Springs	St. Augustine’s, Kansas City	St. Phillip's, Joplin
St. Mary’s, Fayette	St. Mary’s, Kansas City	St. Mark’s, Kimberling City
St. Peter’s, Harrisonville	St. Paul’s, Kansas City	Trinity, Lebanon
St. Michael’s, Independence	St. Peter & All Saints, Kansas City	St. Stephen’s, Monett
Trinity, Independence	Grace Church, Liberty	Church of the Transfiguration, Mountain Grove
St. Anne’s, Lee's Summit	Christ Church, St. Joseph	St. John's, Neosho
St. Paul’s, Lee's Summit	St. Mary’s, Savannah	All Saints', Nevada
Christ Church, Lexington		St. Nicholas, Noel
St. Matthew’s, Raytown		St. Matthew's, Ozark
Calvary, Sedalia		Christ Church, Springfield
St. Philip’s, Trenton		St. James, Springfield
Christ Church, Warrensburg		St. John's, Springfield
		All Saints', West Plains

== Ministries ==
The diocese sponsors and supports a number of ministries throughout its geographical boundaries. They include:

- Saint Luke's Hospital of Kansas City
- Bishop Spencer Place, Kansas City
- Nourish KC
- St. Luke's Nursing Center, Carthage
- Bishop Kemper School for Ministry
- Council of Churches of the Ozarks
- St. Luke's Home Care and Hospice

== See also ==
- List of Succession of Bishops for the Episcopal Church, USA
