= Douglass H. Atwill =

American Episcopal bishop (1881–1960)

The Right Reverend Douglass Henry Atwill D.D.
- Bishop of North Dakota
- Church: Episcopal Church
- Diocese: North Dakota
- Elected: October 1936
- In office: 1937–1951
- Predecessor: Frederick B. Bartlett
- Successor: Richard R. Emery

Orders
- Ordination: December 1907 by Edward Robert Atwill
- Consecration: January 21, 1937 by Stephen Keeler

Personal details
- Born: June 4, 1881 Burlington, Vermont, United States
- Died: May 22, 1960 (aged 78) Minneapolis, Minnesota, United States
- Buried: Lakewood Cemetery
- Denomination: Anglican
- Parents: Edward Robert Atwill & Mary Whiting
- Spouse: Mima Janisch (m. 1909)
- Children: 2

Douglass Henry Atwill (June 4, 1881 – May 22, 1960) was bishop of the Episcopal Diocese of North Dakota, serving from 1937 to 1951.

== Early life and education ==
Atwill was born on June 4, 1881, in Burlington, Vermont, the son of the Reverend, later Bishop of Kansas City, Edward Robert Atwill, and Mary Whiting. He studied at Yale University, graduating with a Bachelor of Arts in 1903, and then at the Episcopal Theological School, from where he earned a Bachelor of Divinity in 1907. He was awarded a Doctor of Divinity from Seabury-Western Theological Seminary in 1934. He married Mima Josephine Janisch on November 2, 1909, and together they had two children.

== Ordained ministry ==
Atwill was ordained deacon in June 1907, and priest in December of the same year, by his father Edward Robert Atwill. He served as rector of Calvary Church in Sedalia, Missouri between 1907 and 1914, and then was a missionary in Ventura County, California between 1914 and 1918, serving St Paul's Mission in Santa Paula, California, and St Mark's Mission in Fillmore, California. In 1918, he returned to Missouri to become rector of St Augustine's Church in St. Louis, while in 1923 he became rector of St Clement's Memorial Church in Saint Paul, Minnesota, where he remained until 1937.

== Bishop ==
In October 1936, Atwill was elected Missionary Bishop of North Dakota. He was consecrated on January 21, 1937, in the Church of St John the Evangelist in Saint Paul, Minnesota, by the Bishop of Minnesota Stephen Keeler. He remained in office until his retirement in 1951. He died on May 22, 1960, in St Barnabas' Hospital, Minneapolis, Minnesota. He was buried in Lakewood Cemetery.
