= Episcopal Diocese of North Dakota =

Diocese of the Episcopal Church in the United States

Coordinates: 46°49′34″N 96°49′07″W

Diocese of North Dakota Diœcesis Dakotensis Septentrionalis

Location
- Country: United States
- Territory: North Dakota, Clay County, Minnesota
- Ecclesiastical province: Province VI

Statistics
- Congregations: 18 (2025)
- Members: 1,918 (2025)

Information
- Denomination: Episcopal Church
- Established: October 11, 1883 (As Missionary District of North Dakota); September 24, 1971 (As Diocese of North Dakota)
- Cathedral: Gethsemane Cathedral

Current leadership
- Bishop: Shay Craig

Map
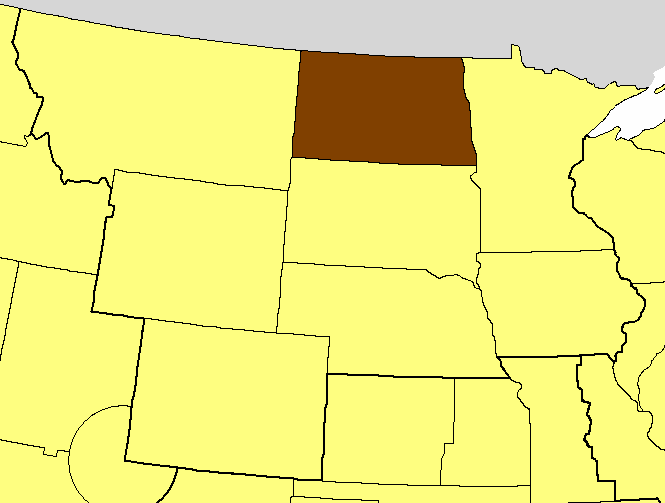
- Location of the Diocese of North Dakota

Website
- www.ndepiscopal.org

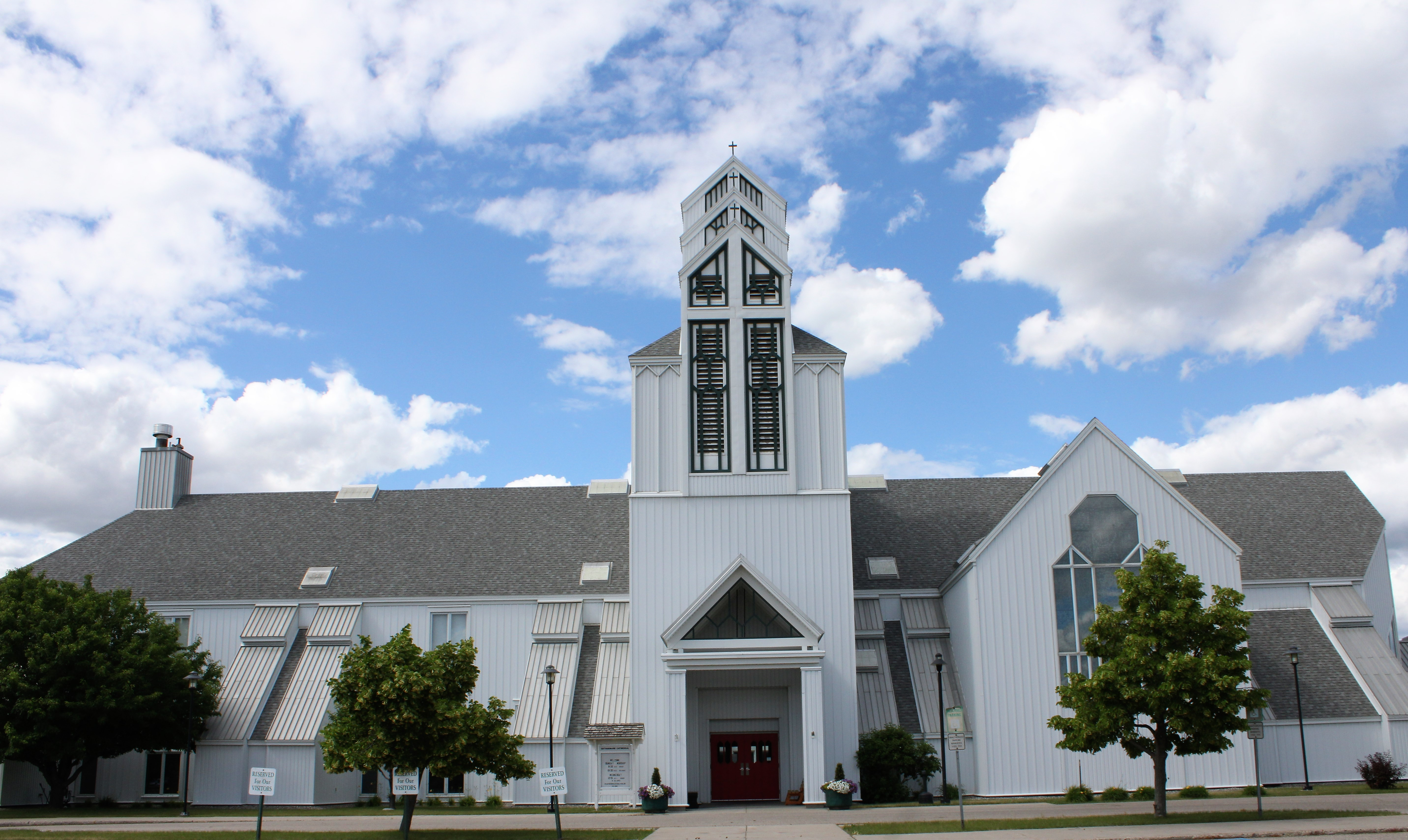
Gethsemane Cathedral, Fargo

The Episcopal Diocese of North Dakota is the diocese of the Episcopal Church in the United States of America with jurisdiction over the state of North Dakota plus Clay County, Minnesota. It has 19 congregations in North Dakota and one in Moorhead, Minnesota. It is in Province VI and its cathedral, Gethsemane Episcopal Cathedral, is in Fargo, as are the diocesan offices.

The most recent diocesan bishop, Michael G. Smith, retired on May 1, 2019, and was subsequently named an assisting bishop in the Diocese of Dallas. He is an enrolled member of the Potawatomi Nation of Oklahoma and a graduate of Seabury-Western Theological Seminary.

The diocesan bishop is the Rt. Rev. Shay Craig.

== Statistics ==
The diocese reported 2,582 members in 2016 and 1,918 members in 2025. Plate and pledge income for the 18 filing congregations of the diocese in 2025 was $807,969. Average Sunday attendance (ASA) in 2025 was 430 persons. This represented a decrease from 663 ASA in 2015.

== List of bishops ==
The bishops of the diocese have been:

1. William D. Walker, 1883–1896
2. Samuel Cook Edsall, 1899–1901
3. Cameron D. Mann, 1902–1913
4. John Poyntz Tyler, 1914–1931
5. Frederick B. Bartlett, 1931–1935
6. Douglass H. Atwill, 1937–1951
7. Richard R. Emery, 1951–1964
8. George T. Masuda, 1965–1979
9. Harold A. Hopkins Jr., 1980–1988
10. Andrew H. Fairfield, 1989–2003
11. Michael G. Smith, 2004–2019
—Thomas C. Ely, Provisional Bishop, 2021−2024
—Brian J. Thom, Provisional Bishop, 2024−2026
12. Shay Craig, 2026−present

== Congregations ==
1. All Saints, Minot
2. All Saints, Valley City
3. Church of the Advent, Devils Lake
4. Church of the Cross, Selfridge
5. Church of the Good Shepherd, Lakota
6. Gethsemane Cathedral, Fargo
7. Grace Church, Jamestown
8. St. Gabriel's Camp, Solen
9. St. George's Episcopal Memorial Church, Bismarck
10. St. James’, Cannon Ball
11. St. John the Divine Episcopal Church (Moorhead, Minnesota)
12. St. John's, Dickinson
13. St. Luke's, Fort Yates
14. Sts. Mary and Mark, Oakes
15. St. Michael and All Angels, Cartwright
16. St. Paul's, Grand Forks
17. St. Paul's, White Shield
18. St. Peter's, Walhalla
19. St. Peter's, Williston
20. St. Stephen's, Fargo
21. St. Sylvan's, Dunseith
22. St. Thomas, Fort Totten

== See also ==
- Historical list of bishops of the Episcopal Church in the United States of America
