= Candice F. Ransom =

American writer (born 1952)

- Born: July 10, 1952 (age 74); Washington, D.C.
- Spouse: Frank Wesley Ransom (1979–present)

Candice F. Ransom (born July 10, 1952) is an American children's and young-adult author. She has written over 150 books as of June 2020, including 18 books for The Boxcar Children series, The Time Spies series and the Sunfire series. She wrote the Dungeons & Dragons novel, Key to the Griffon's Lair (October 2005). Her work includes picture books, easy readers, middle grade fiction, biographies, and nonfiction. More than 45 of her titles have been translated into 12 languages.

== Early years ==
Ransom was born on July 10, 1952, in Washington, D.C., and was raised in Centreville, Virginia. Her parents are Thomas Garland and Irene Dellinger Farris. Her experiences growing up in rural Virginia, especially those as a student at Robert Frost Junior High School, provided ideas for her books' plots and characters.

As a child, Ransom wanted to grow up to be a "Writer-detective-veterinarian-artist". She wrote her first book at age 7 because she had finished reading all the books for her grade at the school library. After that she scribbled stories in her spare time, usually casting herself as the star who had all the fun and solved all the mysteries, inventing the adventures that were in short supply in real life. "I was a very nerdy kid. And I didn't have a best friend until I was in fifth grade, so I wrote stories about how I imagined life could be." In her senior year of high school Ransom began writing in earnest, and she made a commitment to herself to become an author; she decided to become a children's author because she loved children's books best of all.

== Career ==
Lacking the finances to go to college, Ransom wrote magazine articles in her spare time while she earned a living as a secretary. Her first two submissions to publishers were a book titled “Mystery of the Hidden Carousel”, which was sent to Harper, and a picture book about a mouse (text and colored pen drawings on the same page), which was sent to Whitman. "The mystery came back with tire tracks across the envelope. The picture book disappeared down a mouse hole." Her first published book, The Silvery Pass, came out in 1982. The next big step in Ransom's career came when her publisher called with the chance to write a four-hundred-page historical novel for teens. This offer turned into the first two novels of the highly successful "Sunfire" series. By 1989 Ransom had published 17 books, and was invited to be the keynote speaker for the annual conference of The Society of Children's Book Writers.

In 2004, Ransom graduated from Vermont College of Fine Arts with a MFA in Writing for Children, followed by an MA in children's literature at Hollins University in 2007.

Ransom has a monthly column in Bookology Magazine, titled "Big Green Pocketbook". The column discusses a range of issues related to books and reading, shares reflections on Ransom's own life as a child who read constantly, and shines a light on her writing influences and processes.

In addition to her writing, Ransom teaches courses in writing at the university level. In 2006 she taught Creative Writing at Spalding University's graduate program, and has been a faculty member at Hollins University, teaching in the Children's Literature Graduate Program, since 2008.

As of June 2020 Ransom has written 150 books, including 18 books for The Boxcar Children series, The Time Spies series and the Sunfire series. She wrote the Dungeons & Dragons novel, Key to the Griffon's Lair (October 2005). Her work includes picture books, easy readers, middle grade fiction, biographies, and nonfiction. More than 45 of her titles have been translated into 12 languages. Ransom's work has won many honors, including: Booklist Starred Review, School Library Journal Starred Review, ALA Recommended Book for Reluctant Readers, The New York Times 10 Best Illustrated Book, Best Science Book, Children's Book Council Notable Children's Social Studies Book, Pick of the List, New York Public Library Best 100 Book, Book-of-the-Month Club Selection, Smithsonian Notable Book, IRA Children's Choice, IRA Teacher's Choice, Independent Publisher Silver Medal, Independent Publisher Honorable Mention, Virginia Young Readers, Show Me State Readers, Prairie State Readers, Sunshine State Readers, Northern California Librarians Distinguished Book, Chicago Public Library Best of the Best, William Allen White Nominee, Texas Bluebonnet Nominee, and twice Cybils Nominee.

== Works ==
=== Kobie Roberts Series ===
- Almost Ten and a Half (1990)
- Going on Twelve (1988)
- Thirteen (1984)
- Fourteen and Holding (1987)
- Fifteen At Last (1990)

=== Time Spies Series ===
- Secret in the Tower (Time Spies #1) (2006)
- Bones in the Badlands (Time Spies #2) (2006)
- Giant in the Garden (Time Spies #3) (2007)
- Magician in the Trunk (Time Spies #4) (2007)
- Signals in the Sky (Time Spies #5) (2007)
- Rider in the Night: A tale of Sleepy Hollow (Time Spies #6) (2007)
- Horses in the Wind: A tale of Seabiscuit (Time Spies #7) (2007)
- Gold in the Hills: A tale of the Klondike Gold Rush (Time Spies #8) (2008)
- Message in the Mountain (Time Spies #9) (2008)
- Flames in the City: A Tale of the War of 1812 (Time Spies #10) (2008)

=== Tales From the Third Grade Series ===
- Who Needs Third Grade? (1993)
- Third Grade Stars (1993)
- Why Are Boys So Weird? (1994)
- Third Grade Detectives (1994)

=== YA Novels ===
- Amanda (1984)
- Susannah (1984)
- Nicole (1986)
- Emily (1985)
- Kathleen (1985)
- Sabrina (1986)
- So Young to Die: The Story of Hannah Senesh (1993)
- Maria von Trapp: Beyond The Sound of Music (2002)
- Rebel McKenzie (2012)
- Iva Honeysuckle Discovers the World (2012)
- My Sister, The Meanie (1998)
- Seeing Sky-Blue Pink (2007)
- Key to the Griffon's Lair (2005)
- My Sister, The Creep (1989)
- Sixth-Grade High (1991)
- Between Two Worlds (1994)
- Iva Honeysuckle Meets Her Match, illustrated by Heather Ross (2013)
- The Silvery Past (1983)
- My Sister, the Traitor (1989)
- Finding Day's Bottom (2006)
- Breaking the Rules (Chrystal Falls, #2) (1985)
- There's One in Every Family (1990)
- Scrapbooking Just for You!: How to Make Fun, Personal, Save-Them-Forever Keepsakes (2010)
- Hocus Pocus After School (1996)
- Maggie L. Walker: Pioneering Banker and Community Leader (2008)
- Cat's Cradle (1987)
- Today Fifth Grade, Tomorrow the World (1989)
- Terrier Trouble! (National Geographic Kids Chapters) (2017)
- Kaleidoscope(Crosswinds #12) (1987)
- The Spitball Class (1999)
- Blackbird Keep (1986)
- The Love Charm (1990)
- Funniest Sixth Grade Video Ever (1991)
- Ladies and Jellybeans (1991)
- More Than A Name (1995)
- Lady in the Harbor: A Tale of the Statue of Liberty, illustrated by Greg Call (2009)
- Spies in the Ocean: A Tale of World War II, illustrated by Greg Call (?)
- Struggle in the Streets: A Tale of Women's Rights (2009)

=== Children's books ===
- Little Red Riding Hood, illustrated by Tammie Speer Lyon (2001)
- The Big Green Pocketbook, illustrated by Felicia Bond (1993)
- Apple Picking Day!, illustrated by Erika Meza (2016)
- Amanda Panda Quits Kindergarten, illustrated by Christine Grove (2017)
- Pumpkin Day!, illustrated by Erika Meza (2015)
- Listening to Crickets: A Story about Rachel Carson, illustrated by Shelly O. Haas (1994)
- Tooth Fairy's Night, illustrated by Monique Dong (2017)
- Tractor Day, illustrated by Laura J. Bryant (2007)
- Goldilocks and the Three Bears, illustrated by Laura J. Bryant (2001)
- The Old Blue Pickup Truck, illustrated by Jenny Mattheson (2009)
- Uni's First Sleepover, illustrated by Brigette Barrager (2019)
- Amanda Panda and the Bigger, Better Birthday, illustrated by Christine Grove (2018)
- Bones in the White House: Thomas Jefferson's Mammoth, illustrated by Jamey Christoph (2020)
- The Promise Quilt, illustrated by Ellen Beier (1999)
- Snow Day!, illustrated by Erika Meza (2018)
- Garden Day!, illustrated by Erika Meza (2019)
- Pony Island, illustrated by Wade Zahares (2009)
- Liberty Street (2003)
- Rescue on the Outer Banks, illustrated by Karen Ritz (2002)
- The Christmas Dolls (1998)
- Who Wrote the U.S. Constitution?: And Other Questions about the Constitutional Convention of 1787 (2010)
- When the Whippoorwill Calls, illustrated by Kimberly Bulcken Root (1995)
- Clara Barton (2006)
- Children Of The Civil War (Picture The American Past) (1998)
- Hello, Virginia! (2010)
- Big Rigs on the Move (2010)
- Willie McLean and the Civil War Surrender (2004)
- The Twelve Days of Christmas in Washington, D.C., illustrated by Sarah Hollander (2010)
- Millicent the Magnificent (1989)
- One Christmas Dawn, illustrated by Peter M. Fiore (1994)
- Sam Collier and the Founding of Jamestown, illustrated by Matthew Archambault (2007)
- Martha Washington (2003)
- Fire in the Sky (1996)
- Danger at Sand Cave, illustrated by Den Schofield (2000)
- The Day of the Black Blizzard, illustrated by Laurie Harden (2009)
- Lewis and Clark, illustrated by Tim Parlin (2002)
- John Hancock (2004)
- Parts of a Flower(First Step Nonfiction: Pollination) (2015)
- Hello, Washington, D.C.! (2011)
- George Washington (2001)
- The Night of the Hurricane's Fury, illustrated by Paul Tong (2009)
- Daniel Boone (2005)
- Mother Teresa (2000)
- Robert E. Lee, illustrated by Tim Parlin (1990)
- I Like Shoes (2005)
- The Lifesaving Adventure of Sam Deal, Shipwreck Rescuer (2010)
- The Rescue Adventure of Stenny Green, Hindenburg Crash Eyewitness, illustrated by Ted Hammond (2010)
- Teacher's Pest (1997)
- The Underground Adventure of Arly Dunbar, Cave Explorer, illustrated by Ted Hammond and Richard Carbajal (2011)
- Shooting Star Summer, illustrated by Karen Milone (1992)
- Tools and Treasures of Ancient China(What Can We Learn from Early Civilizations?) (2014)
- What Was the Continental Congress?: And Other Questions about the Declaration of Independence (2011)
- Baby Animal Rescues! (2019)
- Jimmy Crack Corn, illustrated by Shelly O. Haas (1993)
- Investigating the Water Cycle (2015)
- What's Great about Indiana? (2015)
- Danger at Dolphin Point (1997)
- Beach Day!, illustrated by Erika Meza (2020)
- Bilingual Fairy Tales Goldilocks and the Three Bears: Ricitos de Oro y los tres osos (2019)
- Bilingual Fairy Tales Little Red Riding Hood: Caperucita Roja (2019)
- Endangered and Extinct Amphibians (2014)
- Why Did English Settlers Come to Virginia?: And Other Questions about the Jamestown Settlement (2010)
- How Aircraft Carriers Work (2019)
- Monster Trucks (2017)
- Jazz Dance (2017)
- Dance Team (2017)
- French Fries (Favorite Foods) (2018)
- The Bilingual Fairy Tales Three Billy Goats Gruff: Los Tres Chivitos (2019)
- Let's Explore the Sense of Smell (2020)
- We're Growing Together (1993)
- Let's Explore the Five Senses (2020)
- George Washington and the Story of the U.S. Constitution, illustrated by Jenni Reeves (2011)
- Let's Explore the Sense of Touch (2020)
- Chocolate Chip Cookies (Favorite Foods) (2018)
- Eerie Haunted Houses (2020)
- Keepsake Stories Little Red Riding Hood illustrated by Joshua Janes (2020)
- James Madison (Founding Fathers) (2018)
- Mysterious Loch Ness Monster (2020)
- Legendary Bigfoot (2020)
- How Fighter Jets Work (2019)
- Pembroke Welsh Corgis (Who's a Good Dog?) (2019)
- Thomas Jefferson (Founding Fathers) (2018)
- Stock Cars (Let's Ride) (2017)

== Personal life ==
On February 14, 1979, she married Frank Wesley Ransom. They live in Fredericksburg, Virginia.

== Recognition ==
Emily, a historical romance written by Ransom, was a 1986 finalist for a Romance Writers of America Golden Medallion award. She has also received International Reading Association/Children's Choice designation (1987) for Fourteen and Holding, Best Science Book for Children designation (1994) for Listening to Crickets, The New York Times Best Illustrated Books of the Year inclusion (1995) and New York Public Library's 100 Best Children's Books inclusion (1995) both for When the Whippoorwill Calls illustrated by Kimberly Bulcken Root, Notable Children's Trade Book in the Social Studies (1997) for One Christmas Dawn and (1998) for Fire in the Sky, Hodge-Podge Award for Best Children's Book (2001) for The Promise Quilt, and Independent Publishers Silver Medal Award (2007) for Finding Day's Bottom.
