= Lesley Attwell =

Canadian softball player (born 1971)

Personal information
- Born: 9 December 1971 (age 54) Brockville, Ontario, Canada

Sport
- Sport: Softball

Lesley Attwell (born 9 December 1971) is a Canadian softball player. She competed in the women's tournament at the 2000 Summer Olympics.

== Biography ==
Attwell was born on 9 December 1971 in Brockville, Ontario, Canada. She grew up in Port Moody. She grew up playing softball as an infielder, being used at shortstop and third base, before trying out catcher around age 17. She told The Vancouver Sun: "At the time we had two catchers on my club team, one was sick and the other didn't show up for the game so our team was stranded. The coach said who wants to try it and I said sure. Hey, you get to wear all that gear and get to be in charge. It sounded like it could be fun."

Attwell then became a top catcher, starring at Simon Fraser University. She helped Simon Fraser reach the NAIA nationals for the first time in program history. She was also active in national softball tournaments, winning junior national titles with her club in 1993 and 1994. Attwell was a member of the Canadian national development team for a time before later being a member of the national team for the 1998 Women's Softball World Championship in Japan, where she helped them to a fifth-place finish. Their fifth-place finish at the world championships allowed them to qualify for the 2000 Summer Olympics. Attwell also competed at the Canada Cup six times by 2000.

In Canada, Attwell played for the club White Rock Renegades and also with a team in Saskatoon. When not playing softball, she worked at Maple Ridge Secondary School as a teacher of physical education and science. Attwell was selected for Canada's team at the 2000 Summer Olympics, being one of the team's two catchers along with Colleen Thorburn-Smith. They finished eighth. Attwell continued playing softball for the national team through 2002.

During her career, Attwell stood at 162 centimetres (5 ft 4 in) and weighed 65 kilograms (143 lb).
