= Gethsemane Episcopal Cathedral (Fargo, North Dakota) =

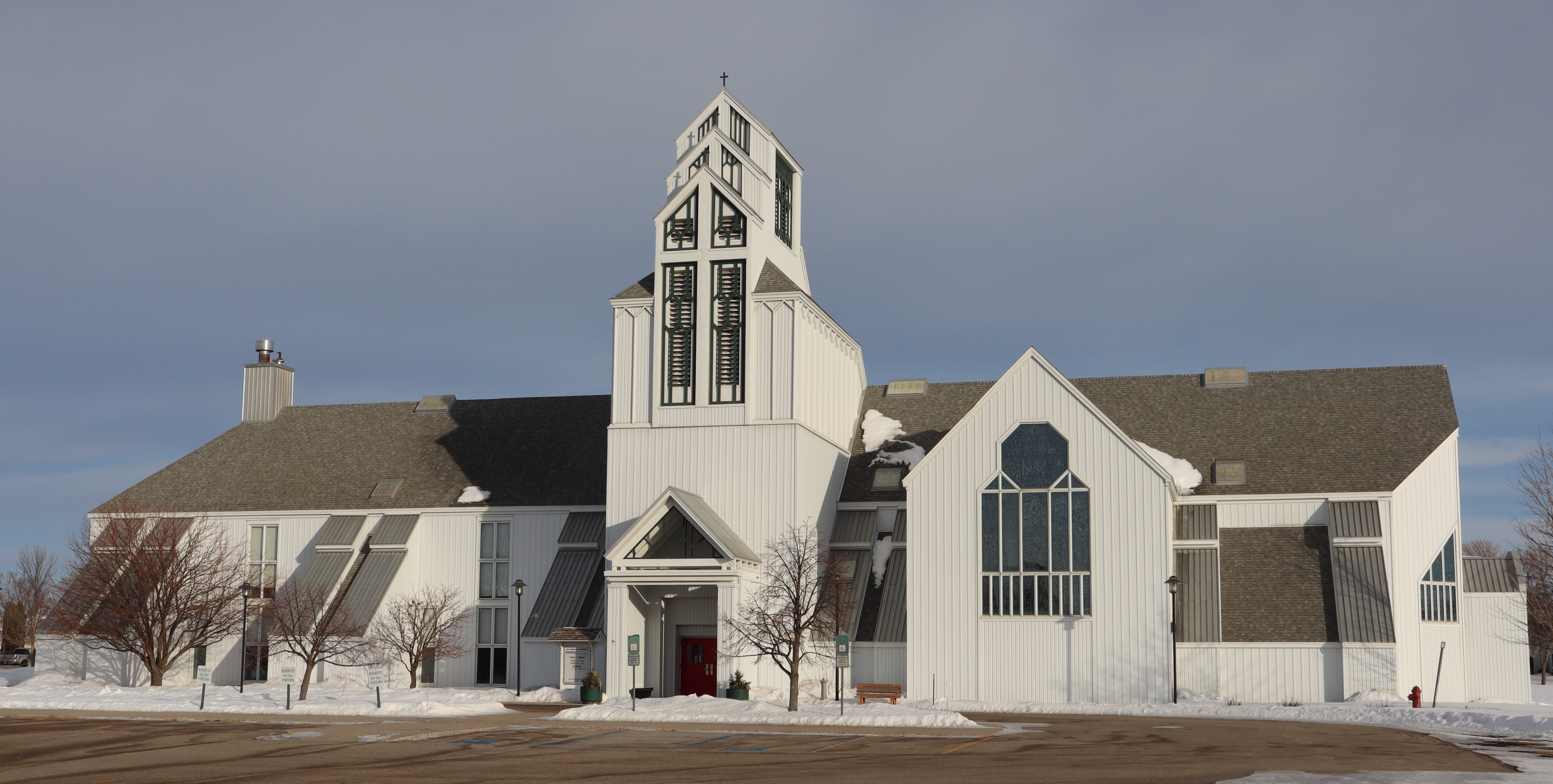
- The new cathedral in 2023

- Location within North Dakota
- 46°49′34.17″N 96°49′7.29″W
- Location: 3600 25th Street South; Fargo, North Dakota
- Country: United States
- Denomination: Episcopal Church
- Website: www.gethsemanecathedralfargo.org

History
- Founded: 1872

Architecture
- Architect(s): Charles W. Moore; Arthur Andersson
- Style: Postmodern
- Completed: 1992

Specifications
- Capacity: 350

Administration
- Diocese: North Dakota

Clergy
- Bishop: Rt. Rev. Michael G. Smith
- Dean: Very Rev. Mark Strobel
- Gethsemane Episcopal Cathedral
- Formerly listed on the U.S. National Register of Historic Places
- Location: 204 S. 9th St.
- NRHP reference No.: 80002909

Significant dates
- Added to NRHP: February 19, 1980
- Removed from NRHP: February 25, 1991

Gethsemane Episcopal Cathedral is an Episcopal cathedral in Fargo, North Dakota, United States. It is the seat of the Diocese of North Dakota. The cathedral reported 307 members in 2023. Plate and pledge income for the congregation in 2024 was $325,460 with average Sunday attendance (ASA) of 110.

== History ==
The first Episcopal service in Fargo was celebrated on August 29, 1872, by the Rev. Joseph A Gilfilian, from Brainerd, Minnesota. Services were held in the Northern Pacific Railway dining tent. Most of the people in the congregation worked for the railroad and their families. In the winter months they held services in Pinkham's Hall, which was located at the corner of Front (Main) and 3rd Streets. The mission was called the Church of the Crossing. In the summer of 1874 construction began on a permanent church building at 204 9th St. South on land donated by General George W. Cass. It was completed the following year and named Christ Church. A couple of years later the church was blown off its foundation. It was rebuilt and given parish status. At this time the parish was renamed Gethsemane.

The Missionary District of North Dakota was established by the Episcopal Church on October 11, 1883, by dividing the Missionary District of Dakota into two districts. Fargo was selected as the See city.

By the 1890s not only had Gethsemane outgrown its church, but it had been blown off its foundation again. A new church was designed in the Gothic Revival style. It was to be constructed in red sandstone, however, because of the national economic depression the plans had to be changed. It was built as a wood-frame building on a sandstone foundation. It featured decorative wooden features that would have normally have been made of stone. The church was located at Second Avenue and Ninth Street South. On September 2, 1900, Gethsemane was elevated to a cathedral. It was the only wooden Episcopal cathedral in the United States.

In 1980 the cathedral was listed on the National Register of Historic Places. As the church was being renovated it caught fire and was destroyed beyond repair on September 12, 1989. The congregation moved to a storefront building that had housed a business college. Walls were taken down to create a worship space. A new cathedral was designed by Austin, Texas architects Charles W. Moore and Arthur Andersson in a Postmodern style referred to as Prairie Gothic. Ground breaking for the new facility was held on May 18, 1991, and it opened the following year. The construction debt was paid off in January 2003.

== See also ==
- List of the Episcopal cathedrals of the United States
- List of cathedrals in the United States
