= Provisional bishop =

Temporary bishop in the Episcopal Church (United States)

A provisional bishop in the Episcopal Church (United States) is a bishop—either retired or concurrently holding another episcopal post (such as in a neighbouring diocese)—who serves as the bishop of a particular diocese during a vacancy in that see. The provisional bishop may then serve either for an agreed period of time or until a new diocesan bishop is elected and consecrated—but both at the pleasure of the diocese's Convention. Provisional bishops are appointed under Canon III.13 of the Constitution and Canons of the Episcopal Church, 2012.

== See also ==
- Diocesan bishop
- Coadjutor bishop
- Suffragan bishop
- Assistant bishop
