= Atwell (surname) =

Atwell is a surname. Notable people with the surname include:

- Clarence Atwell Jr. (1945–2013), Native American tribal leader and politician
- Clive Atwell (born 1988), Guyanese boxer
- Hayley Atwell (born 1982), English actress
- Hugh Atwell (?–1621), English actor
- James Atwell (1946–2020), former Dean of Winchester
- Joe Atwell (1919–1988), North American construction investor and builder
- John Atwell (engineer) (1911–1999), Scottish engineer
- Mal Atwell (born 1936), Australian football player
- Philip Atwell, American video director
- Robert Atwell (born 1954), Anglican Bishop of Exeter
- Rose Atwell (born 2009), American chess player
- Roy Atwell (1878–1962), American actor, comedian and composer
- Sam Atwell (born 1979), Australian actor
- Toby Atwell (1924–2003), American baseball player
- Tutu Atwell (born 1999), American football player
- William H. Atwell (1869–1969), United States federal judge
- Winifred Atwell (1914–1983), pianist born in Trinidad and Tobago
- Yvonne Atwell (born 1943), Canadian politician

In fiction:

- Douglas Atwell, character in the 1928 musical Present Arms
- Miss Atwell, character in Minty Alley

== See also ==
- Attwell, alternate spelling
