= Grace and Holy Trinity Cathedral (Kansas City, Missouri) =

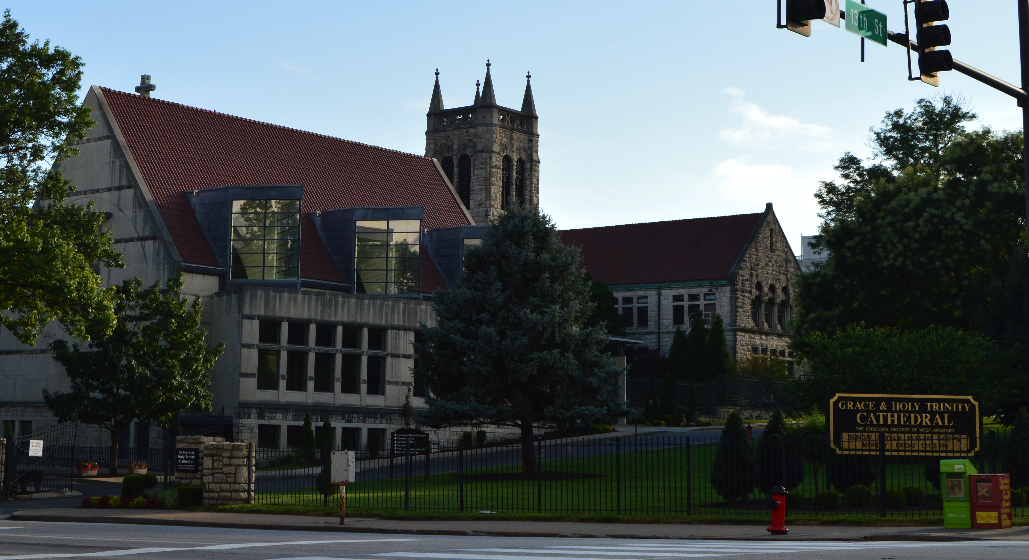

- Location within Missouri
- 39°05′53.4″N 94°35′21.58″W
- Location: 415 W. 13th St. Kansas City, Missouri
- Country: United States
- Denomination: Episcopal Church
- Website: www.kccathedral.org

History
- Consecrated: 1898

Architecture
- Architect: Frederick Elmer Hill
- Style: Transitional Norman Gothic
- Completed: 1895
- Construction cost: $100,000

Specifications
- Capacity: 600–800 persons
- Length: 138 feet (42 m)
- Width: 60 feet (18 m)
- Height: 75 feet (23 m)
- Materials: Limestone

Administration
- Diocese: West Missouri

Clergy
- Bishop: The Rt. Rev. Amy Dafler Meaux
- Dean: The Very Rev. Dr. Andrew C. Keyse

Grace and Holy Trinity Cathedral is an Episcopal cathedral in the Quality Hill neighborhood of downtown Kansas City, Missouri, United States. It is the seat of the Episcopal Diocese of West Missouri.

In 2018, the cathedral reported 972 members; in 2025, it reported 509 members. Average Sunday Attendance (ASA) reported by the cathedral in 2025 was 148 persons. This was a relative decrease from ASA of 278 persons reported in 2015.

== History ==
Grace and Holy Trinity Cathedral was established on the west side of Downtown Kansas City, Missouri, in the Quality Hill area, on July 20, 1870 as "Saint Paul's Church." It was renamed "Grace Church" on April 14, 1873 after a two-year campaign by the Senior Warden, John R. Balis (1834–1914), who had suggested that name at the organizational meeting in 1870. Grace Church built a wood frame structure on the southeast corner of Tenth and Central Streets in 1874. The present church structure, located at 415 West 13th Street, was the second worship space constructed for Grace Church, but the first to be built of stone. It was designed by Frederick Elmer Hill (1857–1929) of the prominent New York City firm, McKim, Mead & White. Construction on the present Nave began in June 1893. (The first stone structure erected at the West 13th Street site, known as Guild Hall, was constructed from May 1888 through March 1890. It was designed by two brothers, Adriance Van Brunt (1836–1913) and John Van Brunt (1854–1924), who had founded an architectural firm known as A. Van Brunt and Company in Kansas City in 1883. In June 1890, the primary convention for the Episcopal Diocese of West Missouri was held in Guild Hall. That building now houses the offices of the Cathedral on the second floor, and the common room, Cathedral Book Store/Gift Shop, choir room, and restrooms on the first floor.)

In the course of designing the new Nave for Grace Church, Hill worked with its Fifth Rector, Dr. Cameron Mann, D.D., LL.D. (1851–1932). Mann had just returned from a three-month trip to England, where he studied the many great cathedrals of that country, when he asked the Vestry of Grace Church to engage Hill as the architect for the new stone structure. Hill's design for the Nave was greatly influenced by Mann's vision after his tour of English churches and cathedrals.

The style of the building is transitional Norman Gothic, because, while the window and door frames in the building are rounded as in the Norman English style, the main arch at the top of the chancel steps is pointed, as are Gothic arches and windows. The foundations for this structure were laid in 1888, along with the foundations for Guild Hall. The interior of the Nave was completed in December 1894, and the first worship service was held there on December 16, 1894. The building was consecrated on May 15, 1898. Since this church building was intended to serve as a parish church, it was not conceived in the usual cathedral format, and is not cruciform, with transepts, nor does it contain colonnaded aisles that flank the Nave. For many years, the congregation of this parish has referred to the entire structure as "the Nave."

Selected entries for the 1887 competition held to design Grace Church

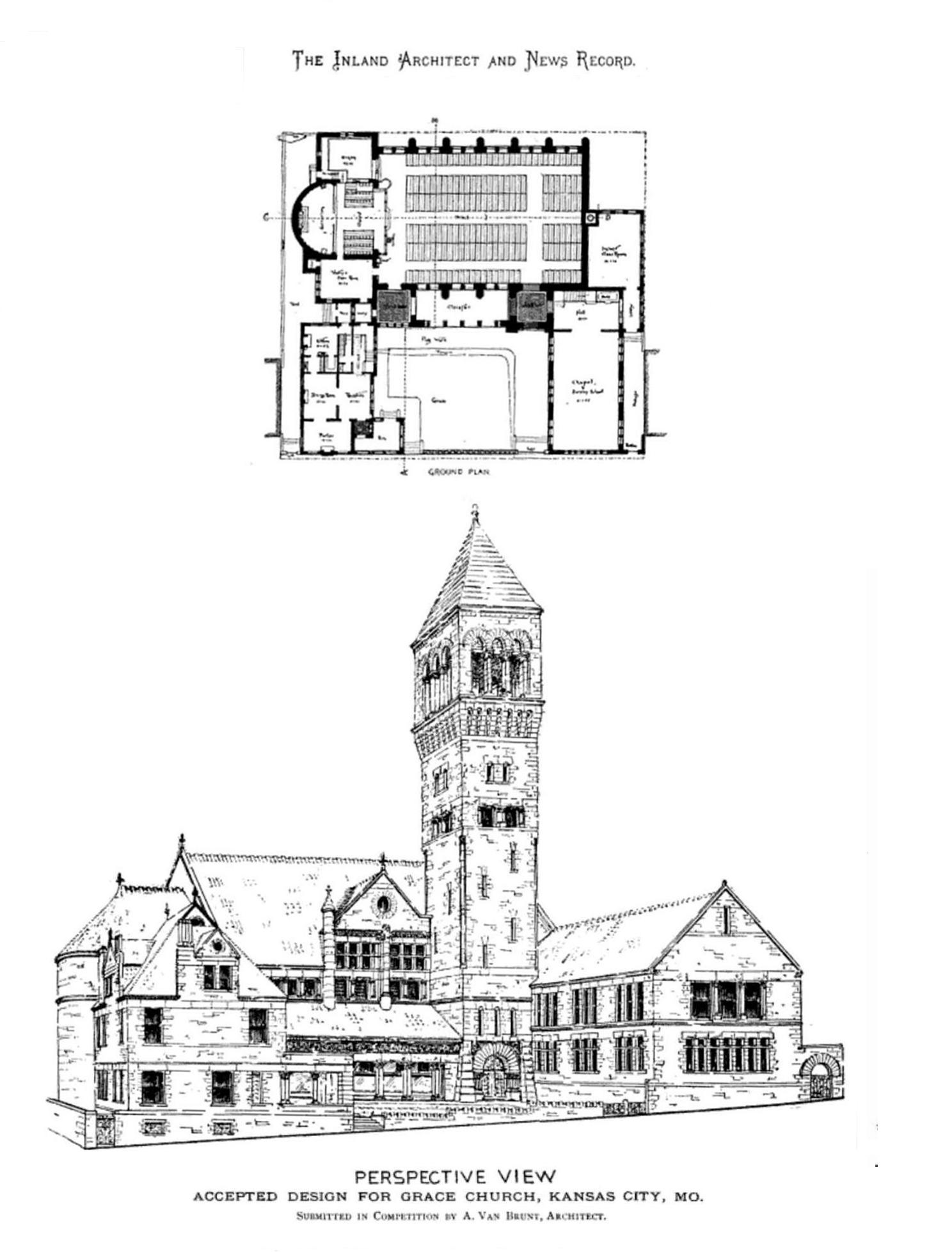
The winning entry by the Kansas City, Missouri architectural firm of A. Van Brunt and Company

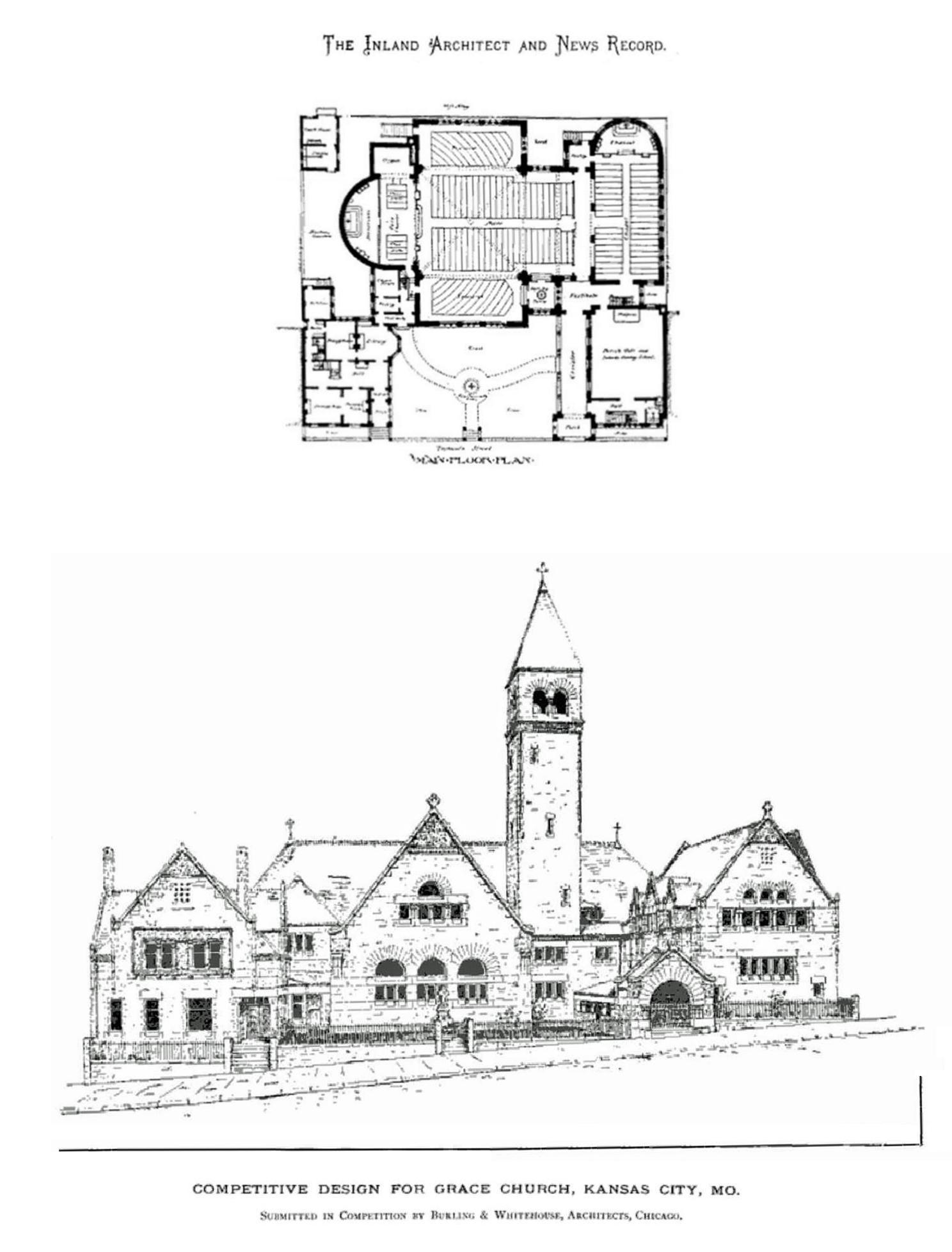
Entry submitted by the noted Chicago architects Burling and Whitehouse

The architect who designed what is today known as Guild Hall was selected in a competition whose parameters specified among other things that the church should “...cost $117,000 which [did] not cover the cost of the tower beyond the first story, nor the windows.”. These two pages initially appeared in the October, 1887 edition of The Inland Architect and News Record.

The Nave of Grace and Holy Trinity Cathedral is 138 feet long, 60 feet wide, and the peak of the interior roof is 75 feet above the Nave floor, which is constructed of oak in a chevron pattern. There are five east-west aisles in the Nave, and one north-south cross aisle, which intersects the other five aisles at the door of the Tower in the north wall over to the Madonna window in the south wall. The oak pews in the Nave are original to the structure. While the Nave originally seated about 700 people, the removal of some pews in the east end of the room, and the rearrangement of some of the remaining pews, has lowered the seating capacity to just under 600 people. With the addition of individual chairs placed over every available inch of floor space, the Nave of Grace and Holy Trinity Cathedral is able to accommodate a congregation of close to 800 people.

It is important to understand that the interior of the Nave was never completed as Hill and Mann intended. The walls inside the room were to have been covered by a wainscot of marble with oak paneling above. The door and window frames, which stick out into the room, were to have been ornately carved. There was to have been a carved marble cornice around the top of the chancel wall, and the floor of the chancel was to have featured a marble mosaic. These plans for the completion of the Nave were left unfinished due to lack of funds. After a great many years, the plans were forgotten.

However, the drab walls and unfinished door and window frames pale when one beholds the beauty of the stained glass windows in the Nave. Grace and Holy Trinity Cathedral is one of the most important living museums of stained glass in the United States of America. Within its walls are included a 1901 window from the studio of Otto Heinigke (1850–1915) and Owen Joshua Bowen (1866–1902), the only example of their work in a church west of the Mississippi River; a 1903 window by Frederick Stymetz Lamb (1862–1928) of J&R Lamb Studios; a 1911 window from Duffner and Kimberly, designed by J. Gordon Guthrie (1874–1961), one of the largest single windows ever produced by that firm; a window designed in 1912 by American female stained glass artist, Mary Fraser Wesselhoeft (1873–1971), and fabricated in January 1913 in Berlin by Gottfried Heinersdorff (1883–1941) (it is believed that this is the only example of Heinersdorff's work on the North American Continent); a Munich-style Madonna window from the German-influenced studio of the Jacoby Art Glass Company of St. Louis, designed in 1926 by Lee Albert Cook (1888–1981); a 1930 window from Tiffany Studios, illustrating Verse 1 of Psalm 42: "Like as the hart desireth the waterbrooks, so longeth my soul after Thee, O God.", that provides a kaleidoscope of colors at sunset each day; seven windows in a "Life of Christ" series designed in 1930 by English stained glass artist James Humphries Hogan (1883–1948); a very late Tiffany window dating from 1935, (the firm had declared bankruptcy in 1932 and was operating under the corporate name "Louis C. Tiffany Studios Corporation",) designer unknown, but in the style of Frederick Wilson (1858–1932); and three windows from Boston stained glass artist Dr. Charles Jay Connick (1875–1945), installed and dedicated in 1943, 1944, and 1945.

In November 1917, the parish of Grace Church was merged with another existing Episcopal church in Downtown Kansas City, Trinity Church, which had been founded in 1883. The newly merged parish was named "Grace and Holy Trinity Church". After its Rector, Robert Nelson Horatio Spencer (1877–1961) became the Third Bishop of the Diocese of West Missouri in 1930, he worked to see that his former parish became the Cathedral Church of the Diocese. After five years, Grace and Holy Trinity Church was consecrated as the Cathedral of the Diocese of West Missouri on October 29, 1935.

Just as the interior of Grace Church was not completed in 1894, neither was the planned Tower. It remained a two-storey stump until 1936, when Henry DeLancy Ashley (1856–1938) began a building campaign to complete it with his donation of $100. Consulting with the Kansas City architectural firm of Wight & Wight, and with William Drewin Wight (1882–1947) serving as the principal architect, the Cathedral's Tower was finally completed to a new design by Mr. Wight in May 1938. Unfortunately, Mr. Ashley did not live to see the completed structure, for he died on February 9, 1938. He left a great legacy: he served for 51 consecutive years on the Vestry of the parish, through its three incarnations as Grace Church, Grace and Holy Trinity Church, and finally, Grace and Holy Trinity Cathedral—and he spearheaded a successful campaign to finish the Cathedral building after more than 40 years of incompletion.

The adjacent properties around the Cathedral were acquired between 1931 and 1976. A Diocesan Center was built in 1978 on the recently acquired southwest corner of the Cathedral's city block. It was designed by Stephen N. Abend (born 1939). The Diocesan Center was completed in 1980 and dedicated on Saturday, May 17, 1980.

An organ by the German/Canadian organ builder Gabriel Kney (born 1929) was installed in the nave in 1981. The organ is Opus 94, and is one of the larger tracker action instruments Kney built. It was dedicated in a special recital by Dr. John Wesley Obetz (1933-2015) on April 26, 1981. The organ was renovated in 2004 by D. Leslie Smith (born 1950), who had assisted Kney with the original construction and installation of the instrument. In this renovation, well-worn keyboards were re-covered, the original stop knobs were replaced by new ones, and new pipework was installed to allow for some revoicing that produced an instrument of rather more warmth than the original. In 2013, the chorus reeds were replaced with ranks that blended with the flue work instead of standing apart in larger ensembles, resulting in reeds possessing a more refined timbre but still with a brilliance that now includes more of the fundamental overtones. These modifications also promoted more stability in the tuning of the organ, because the new reed pipes were built to actual pitch length, and they are capable of maintaining their pitch over a wider variation of temperature in the Nave.

In the cold night of January 22, 1986, a portion of the exterior stonework of the north wall of the Nave collapsed. This was not a structural collapse, as only stones of the exterior facade of the wall were involved. However, after the entire structure was inspected, it was found that most of the original construction mortar for the Nave had been made using high proportions of sand and lime, with only a little cement, and that this mortar had deteriorated to the point that it was not much more than sand. This inspection called into question the stability of the stonework at the top of all four walls of the Nave. A major structural repair was immediately undertaken, during which the roof of the Nave was independently supported. The congregation was displaced from its primary worship space for a period of 20 months while the repairs were made. The first worship service held in the newly renovated Nave was on September 13, 1987.

Founders' Hall

In 1997, ground was broken for construction of Founders' Hall, which came into being in large part from the vision of the Dean Emeritus of the Cathedral, J. Earl Cavanaugh (1930–2007) and William Thornton Kemper, Jr. (1902-1989). It was designed by Robert Taylor (born 1957) and Patricia MacDougall (born 1958). The building was completed in April 1999 and dedicated on April 10, 1999. It houses a large assembly room for the congregation, with a small professional kitchen, storage, and restrooms on its main floor. The lower level contains a much larger professionally equipped kitchen and dining area, the Archives of the Cathedral, and more storage space. In 2020, a large mural was added to the East Wall in the large assembly room through the generosity of the Kemper family.

== Associated clergy ==
Grace and Holy Trinity Cathedral was under the bishops of the Diocese of Missouri from 1844 to 1890 and the Diocese of West Missouri thereafter.

The rectors of Grace Church (1870–1911):

- The Rev. Franklin Reeve Haff (1821–1906), from December 1870 to September 1871
- The Rev. Algernon Batte (1830–1907), from January 1872 to June 1874
- The Rev. Joseph E. Martin (1840–1900), from July 1874 to July 1876
- The Rev. Herman Cope Duncan (1846–1920), from October 1876 to March 1880
- The Rev. Cameron Mann (1851–1932), from February 1881 through December 1901
- The Rev. Theodore Bogert Foster (1858–1935), from April 1902 to October 1906
- The Rev. Julius Augustus Schaad (1866–1938), from December 1906 to August 1911

The curates/vicars of Grace Church (1912–1917):

- The Rev. Henry R. Remsen (1874–1957), Curate from 1912 to 1913
- The Rev. Benjamin Franklin Root (1873–1967), Vicar from 1914 to 1916
- The Rev. Fuller Swift (1869–1940), Vicar from 1916 to 1917

The rectors of Trinity Church (1883–1917):

- The Reverend Robert E. Talbot (1855–1923) From 1883 to 1908
- The Reverend Robert Nelson Horatio Spencer (1877–1961) From 1909 to 1917

The rectors of Grace and Holy Trinity Church (1917–1935):

- The Rev. Robert Nelson Horatio Spencer (1877–1961), from 1917 to 1930
- The Rev. Claude Willard Sprouse (1888–1952), from 1931 to 1935

The deans of Grace and Holy Trinity Cathedral (1935–present):

- The Very Rev. Claude Willard Sprouse (1888–1952), from 1935 to 1952
- The Very Rev. Clarence Haden Jr. (1910–2000), from 1953 to 1957
- The Very Rev. Donald Robertson Woodward (1912–2006), from 1958 to 1968
- The Very Rev. Eugene Glenn Malcolm (1919–1975), from 1968 to 1975
- The Very Rev. J. Earl Cavanaugh (1930–2007), from 1976 to 1995
- The Very Rev. Dennis J. J. Schmidt (born 1951), from 1996 to 2002
- The Very Rev. Terry Allen White (born 1959), from 2004 to 2010
- The Very Rev. Peter Jay DeVeau (born 1953), from 2011 to July 15, 2018
- The Very Rev. Dr. Andrew Carl Keyse (born 1969), from December 1, 2019; installed January 9, 2020

== See also ==
- List of the Episcopal cathedrals of the United States
- List of cathedrals in the United States
