= Scarritt =

Scarritt is a surname. Notable people with the surname include:

- Dorothy Scarritt McKibbin (1897–1975), American Manhattan Project manager
- Natalie Scarritt Wales (1909–2013), American socialite and philanthropist
- Nathan Scarritt (1821–1890), American educator, pastor and real estate dealer
- Russ Scarritt (1903–1994), American baseball player
- William Chick Scarritt, American lawyer and owner of William Chick Scarritt House

== See also ==
- Scarratt
