= James Nutter =

James Nutter may refer to:

- James A. Nutter, American football player and coach
- James B. Nutter Sr. (1928–2017), founder and chairman of James B. Nutter & Company
