= Scarratt =

Scarratt is a surname. Notable people with the surname include:

- Billy Scarratt (1878–1958), English football player
- Emily Scarratt (born 1990), English rugby player
- Graeme Scarratt (born 1945), English cricketer
- Jimmy Scarratt (1868–1933), English football player
- Kenneth Scarratt (born 1948), British gemologist

== See also ==
- Scarritt
