= James B. Nutter & Company =

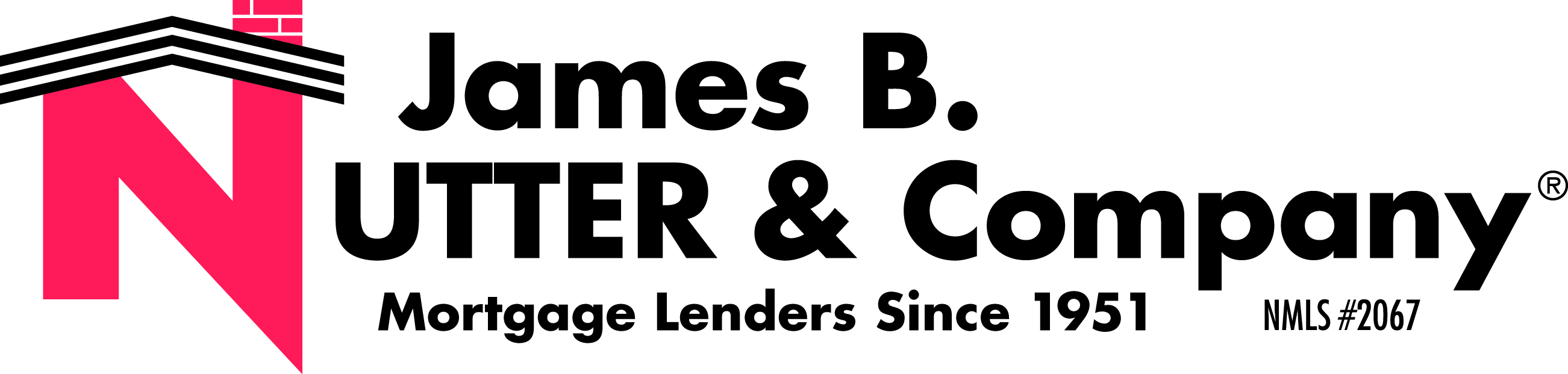
- Type: Private
- Industry: Mortgage Lending
- Founded: 1951
- Founder: James B. Nutter
- Headquarters: Kansas City, MO, United States
- Products: 15- and 30-Year Fixed-Rate Mortgages; FHA Loans; VA Loans; USDA Loans; Reverse Mortgage
- Website: jbnutter.com

James B. Nutter & Company is a privately owned mortgage banking firm headquartered in Kansas City, Mo. It is one of the oldest and largest firms in the United States of America, servicing $7 billion in mortgages and making loans in all 50 states. James B. Nutter & Co. offers products and services such as conventional mortgages; FHA mortgages; VA mortgages; reverse mortgages; USDA (United States Department of Agriculture) mortgages; no closing cost refinancing; and HARP (Home Affordable Refinance Program) refinancing options. The company is known for its philanthropy, historic preservation, and efforts to promote racial equality and diversity. James B. Nutter & Company acquired several older homes in Kansas City's historic Westport neighborhood and turned them into a collection of office spaces known as Nutterville. The formerly drab houses were renovated and painted in bright colors and surrounded by flower beds. The work has included the preservation of the Reverend Nathan Scarritt House.

== Background ==
James B. Nutter Sr. founded James B. Nutter & Company In 1951, working out of his apartment. Nutter specialized in home loans and refinancing home loans. James B. Nutter & Company was one of the first Kansas City mortgage companies to get government-backed Veterans Administration home loans. In 1964, with foreclosure rates on the rise, Nutter's company created a forbearance program to help borrowers who were behind on their house payments. In the 1950s and ‘60s, James B. Nutter & Company did not follow the discriminatory lending practices of the day and became one of the first companies in the industry to make home loans in black neighborhoods and to single women on a large scale. James B. Nutter & Company continued to countermand discriminatory practices in the 1970s, when its Village Green apartments rented units to anyone who could pay the rent, regardless of race. Furthermore, James B. Nutter & Company was the first bank to originate a HECM loan in 1989. In November 2012, Nutter received the Harold L. Holliday Sr. Civil Rights Award from the NAACP’s Kansas City, Mo. Branch. During the subprime mortgage crisis in 2006 and 2007, the company received recognition for maintaining conservative underwriting practices. James B. Nutter & Company. was a pioneer in reverse mortgages, having initiated the first Federal Housing Administration-insured reverse mortgages in 1989.

== Employees ==
The James B. Nutter & Company employs approximately 200 loan officers, processors and support staff at its headquarters in Kansas City’s historic Westport neighborhood. The current CEO is James B. Nutter.

== Philanthropy and awards ==
The company and its founder, James B. Nutter Sr., have been involved in historic preservation and philanthropic activities in the Kansas City area. The company has been recognized by organizations such as the Negro Leagues Baseball Museum for the John "Buck" O'Neil Award for outstanding support of the museum; Children's Mercy Hospital; board representation for Harry S. Truman Library Institute; Little Sisters of the Poor; Gordon Parks Elementary School; Jackson County (Mo.) Historical Society (6); Truman Medical Center, American Red Cross, Rockhurst University, University of Missouri – Kansas City, Kansas City Art Institute, the Learning Exchange, Habitat for Humanity, Science City at Union Station, Jackson County Historical Society and others

== Legal issues ==
In 2020, the United States Department of Justice filed a civil complaint against the company alleging that it had improperly certified federally insured reverse mortgage loans that did not meet the requirements established by the U.S. Department of Housing and Urban Development. The complaint alleged that the company employed underwriters lacking the qualifications to write Home Equity Conversion Mortgage (HECM) loans between 2008 and 2010.
