= Isaac McCoy =

American missionary (1784–1846)

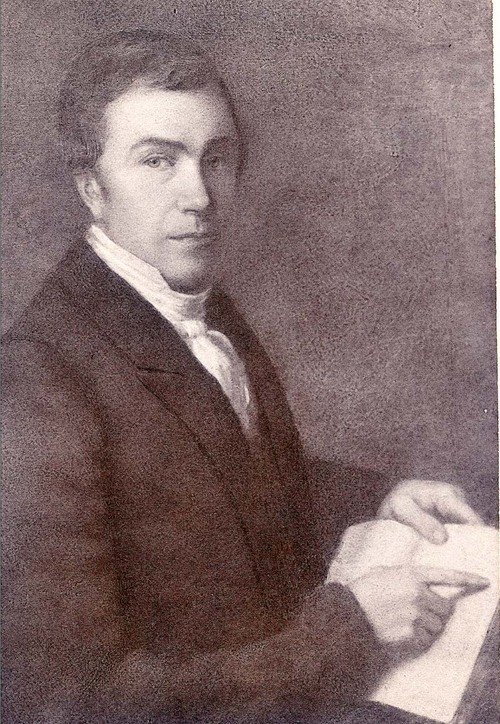
- 1831 painting of McCoy
- Born: June 13, 1784; Uniontown, Pennsylvania, US
- Died: June 21, 1846 (aged 62); Louisville, Kentucky, US
- Occupations: Baptist minister and missionary to tribes
- Years active: 1808-1846
- Children: John Calvin McCoy
- Relatives: William Miles Chick (co-father-in-law); Nathan Scarritt; William Chick Scarritt; Dorothy McKibbin

Isaac McCoy (June 13, 1784 – June 21, 1846) was an American pioneer and Baptist missionary among the Native Americans in what became the states of Indiana, Michigan, Missouri, and Kansas.

He was an advocate of saving the dwindling tribes from decades of ongoing American abuse, by leading their charitable removal from the eastern United States into their own homesteading. He serially established successful tribal missions at the remote western American frontiers, hundreds of miles beyond any white settlements, repeatedly relocating westward due to encroachment and exploitation. He wrote books and made many trips to Washington, D.C. to solicit funds, create programs, and propose a permanent sovereign tribal colony within Indian Territory, which instead became the states of Kansas, Nebraska, and Oklahoma. He pioneered the areas that became Grand Rapids, Michigan and Kansas City, Missouri.

== Early life ==
McCoy was born in Uniontown, Pennsylvania, on June 13, 1784, to William and Elizabeth Royce McCoy. Five years later, the McCoy family rafted down the Ohio River to Kentucky, settling first near Louisville and in 1792 in Shelby County. When he was nine years old, he lost three fingers while chopping wood. When he was nineteen years old, he felt a call from God to go out and preach.

His father was a Baptist minister, sharing profound arguments with him about religion. His father, on theological principles shared by many of his congregation, was opposed to evangelizing. McCoy was inspired in childhood to become a missionary to Native Americans and determined on that work.

=== Marriage and family ===
On October 6, 1803, Isaac McCoy married Christiana Polke (1778–1851), age 16, in Kentucky. She was a cousin of the future President James K. Polk. Christiana's family had been at Kincheloe's Station, Nelson County, Kentucky, when it was attacked. Her mother and four siblings were carried into captivity by the Shawnee, and Christiana was born after that time. They were taken to Michigan, where they lived with the Indians for 13 months. They were eventually "bought" or ransomed by the British, who sent them south to return to their people in Kentucky.

The McCoys had 14 children, only four of whom survived to adulthood. John Calvin McCoy assisted his father and became prominent in the early history of the Kansas and Missouri frontiers.

McCoy's wife, Christiana, died in Kansas City in 1851. A stream in Elkhart County, Indiana and a lake in Cass County, Michigan are named for her.

== Westward migration ==
Soon after their marriage, the young couple departed Kentucky for Vincennes, Indiana. Although he had no training and no formal education, McCoy became a part-time preacher. In 1808, the Silver Creek Baptist Church, the first Baptist Church in Indiana, granted McCoy a license "to preach the Gospel wherever God in His providence might cast his lot". The Silver Creek church was located near what became Sellersburg in Clark County. In 1809, McCoy became pastor of Maria Creek Church near Vincennes. In 1810, the Church ordained him as a minister. He was the town jailor at Vincennes.

Through illness and poverty, McCoy traveled widely, if unsuccessfully, on the frontier promoting the Baptist church. In 1817, the Baptist Board of Foreign Missions appointed him as a missionary to the settlers and Indians in Indiana and Illinois territories. Though his original intention was to preach to frontiersmen, his interests and concern for Indians quickly began to dominate his work.

== Missions in Indiana and Michigan ==
McCoy founded his first "religious station" and school in October 1818 in what became Parke County, Indiana, on Big Raccoon Creek upstream from the later Wea Indian reservation at Armiesburg. The mission was said to be situated between Rosedale and Bridgeton. The Wea showed little interest in the school, and it failed. McCoy at that time was likely the only white settler in Parke County. In February 1819, he performed the first marriage in the county, between two métis, Christmas Dazney (Noel Dagenet) and Mary Ann Isaacs, a Brotherton or Mohegan from upstate New York.

In 1821, in compensation for his work with McCoy and for the federal government as an interpreter, Dazney filed a land claim between the mouths of Sugar Creek and Big Raccoon Creek north and east of present-day Montezuma and established a Wea-Miami reservation there. This was the first reservation that came about as a result of a connection with Isaac McCoy, though McCoy had left the area by then. Dazney was eventually instrumental in leading bands of Indiana Indians west to Kansas after the Indian Removal Act of 1830. Dazney died in Kansas in 1848.

In May 1820, the McCoy family moved to Fort Wayne, Indiana to set up a mission to the Miami tribe. His school at Fort Wayne attracted 40 Miami, Potawatomi, and mixed-blood children, several whites, and one African American. The Miami and Potawatomi tribes at this time had many members of mixed race, who were fully accepted when growing up their mothers in the tribes.

In 1821, McCoy made the first of many visits to Washington, DC, seeking approval by the federal government, unsuccessfully on this occasion, for him to appoint teachers, blacksmiths, and other "agents of civilization" to be provided the Indians under newly ratified treaties. In 1821, Chief Little Turtle of the Miami, along with 16 other Indians and the captive William Wells, also traveled to Washington, D.C., seeking aid. It was Little Turtle's second visit to a president. He gained approval of a government-funded Quaker agricultural mission to the Miami.

In December 1822, McCoy left Fort Wayne and moved his family and 18 Indian students to a site on the St. Joseph River near Lake Michigan and the present-day city of Niles in southwestern Michigan. He opened a mission to the Pottawatomi, which came to be known as the Carey Mission, named after the English missionary to India, William Carey (1761–1834). It was 100 miles (160 km) west of the nearest White settlement. The Pottawatomi gave McCoy a relatively warm welcome and helped feed his large family and Indian students through their early seasons in the hostile territory. This became his most successful missio yet, and his school expanded to have 76 Indian children, four Indian employees, five missionaries, six white children, and a millwright. Carey Mission was called the "point from which the American frontier was extended".

Carey Mission often suffered a subsistence diet. McCoy once wrote, "Blessed be God, we have not yet suffered for lack of food; for parched corn is an excellent substitute for bread. [...] But, now having eaten our last grain of corn, we cannot avoid some anxiety about our next meal."

In 1826, McCoy moved his family deeper into the western frontier, where he established the Thomas Mission to the Odawa people, at what later became Grand Rapids, Michigan. McCoy and his missionaries were the first European-American pioneers of Niles and Grand Rapids.

== Indian removal ==
McCoy began in 1823 to advocate that the Indian nations of the East be moved west "beyond the frontiers of the White settlement". He believed that getting the tribes to their own, isolated places, away from the reach of whiskey traders and others who were exploiting them, would give them a better chance of surviving and becoming Christianized. McCoy's ideas for removal of the Indians were not new, but he promoted the idea that the U.S. government should fund "civilization programs" to educate the Indians and turn them into farmers and Christians. McCoy expanded his concept later to propose the creation of an Indian state making up most of the land area of what is now Kansas, Oklahoma, and Nebraska.

McCoy thought of himself as the future leader of what he called "Indian Canaan", but he had little confidence in his fellow missionaries. They never accomplished more than "to soften the pillows of the dying" and had "too recently been transplanted from the sterile plains of religious bigotry, to expand with liberal views of the character, and of the just rights of man". Rather, he placed his faith in the government to create for the Indians "a country of their own" where they could "feel their importance, where they can hope to enjoy, unmolested, the fruits of their labours, and their national recovery need not be doubted". His proposed Indian colony, to become subsequently a Territory and then a State within the United States, was intended to be guided by a benign U.S. government and missionaries, with whiskey dealers and dishonest merchants banned.

McCoy could not foresee that the frontier of white settlement was expanding so rapidly that his Indian Canaan would be overrun by settlers before Indians could enjoy "unmolested, the fruits of their labours". Moreover, he overestimated the good will and capacity of the government. During the tragic removals forced on the Indians by the U.S. government in the 1830s and later, thousands died of neglect and arrived in Kansas and Oklahoma impoverished and starving. McCoy's well-intentioned conversion programs and philosophy of relocation, were coopted by others to culminate in the 1838 Potawatomi Trail of Death.

== Surveyor of Indian Territory ==
The possibility of removing eastern Indians west of the Mississippi River was enhanced in 1825 when the Osage and the Kaw ceded large portions of their lands in Kansas and Oklahoma to the United States. In 1828, Congress authorized McCoy to lead an expedition to survey lands to which the Chickasaw, Choctaw, and Creek of the Southeast could be relocated. McCoy also invited representatives of the Potawatomi and Odawa to join the expedition. With the unenthusiastic Indians, McCoy traveled through Kansas and Oklahoma laying out potential reservations and devising in his mind the organization of an Indian State.

In June 1829, McCoy moved his family to Fayette, Missouri. Late that year, at his own expense, he carried out a survey on the Kaw lands. In 1830, with Kaw "mixed blood" Joseph James as his guide, he surveyed and established the boundaries of a reservation for the Delaware tribe who were persuaded to move there from their territories in southern Missouri.

In 1829, his book was published, Remarks on the Practicability of Indian Reform, Embracing Their Colonization. It recounts a four-page, cited, historical summary of the essential justification of the European colonization of the continent since Jamestown—and refutes each essential element. He laments the callous conquest of the native tribes, the disregard of their very concept of government, land rights, and freely chosen lifestyle. He compares this to a hypothetical conquest of the modern Washington, DC by Chinese invaders who could similarly see America as alien, uncivilized, and inferior.

Again, it has been asserted that "the Indians have no idea of a title to the soil itself". This is an assumption without the shadow of reason; indeed, it is at variance with the recurrence of positive and well known facts. It has been the misfortune of the Indian that he was incapable of recording on parchment his views of this subject, or of publishing them to the world, and pleading his own cause. But ask the Commissioners of the United States, who have encountered so many difficulties in negotiating with the natives for cessions of their lands, and they will tell you, that the assumption is untenable. Look to the whole course of Indian conduct relative to the case, ever since the settlement of whites on the continent, and an united voice, as of many waters, will tell you. Or, visit the Indians in their tents, and they will tell you themselves, and that too, in expressions of grief and despair, that, unless your heart be cased in adamant, will make you both sigh and weep. Indians are actually sitting by me while I pen this paragraph: I cannot be mistaken.

In 1830 Congress passed the Indian Removal Act, which formally authorized the removal of eastern Indians to the West. For the next ten years, McCoy was engaged in surveying boundaries of reservations for more than twenty tribes who moved west to present-day Kansas. Often they comprised small remnants of formerly powerful peoples. McCoy had hoped to be one of the three commissioners appointed to oversee Indian Territory, but he was passed over and his dreams of becoming the government's chief representative to the Indian tribes were dashed.

Aware of the fraud, abuse, and neglect involved in the removal of Indians westward, McCoy rationalized that it was for the greater good of having Indian lands secured for them in perpetuity. Such "perpetuity" was to last little more than two decades.

== Missionary work in the 1830s ==
McCoy, his son John, his daughter Delilah, and her missionary husband Johnston Lykins, formerly a teacher at McCoy's school at Raccoon Creek, worked together as missionaries to the Shawnee and Lenape (Delaware), following them to what is now the Kansas City metropolitan area, on the eastern border of Indian Territory and near their reservations. John McCoy established a trading post at Westport, Missouri and was a co-founder of the town of Kansas, Missouri—which combined to become Kansas City, Missouri. Lykins was a co-founder of Kansas and was elected its first legal mayor, remaining a major civic booster of Kansas City for the rest of his life.

McCoy's strong views were often at odds with the Baptist mission board and other missionaries. In 1832, a smallpox epidemic was killing thousands of Indians. McCoy traveled to Washington, seeking funds from Congress to support a vaccination program for Indians. He found little enthusiasm for such a bill. The Missouri Senator, Alexander Buckner, said to him about the Indians, "if they were all dead it would be a blessing for our country". Partially due to his efforts, Congress eventually passed a modest bill to finance Indian vaccinations.

In 1833, McCoy was reportedly armed and involved with a company of "ruffians", a mob in Independence, Missouri who attacked Mormon families at gunpoint and expelled them from their homes onto the prairie, where they nearly starved. The Mormon publication Autobiography of Parley Parker Pratt recalls: "While we thus made our escape the companies of ruffians were ranging in every direction; bursting into homes without fear, knowing that the people [the Mormons] were disarmed; frightening women and children, and threatening to kill them if they did not flee immediately. At the head of one of these parties appeared the Rev. Isaac McCoy (a noted Baptist missionary to the tribes), with gun in hand, ordering the people to leave their homes immediately and surrender everything in the shape of arms. Other pretended preachers of the Gospel took part in the persecution - speaking of the [Mormon] Church as the common enemies of mankind, and exulting in their afflictions."

In a letter c. 1839, included in the Mormon publication The Joseph Smith Papers, Edward Partridge recalled the same incident, when the Mormons were disarmed at Independence: "Wednesday Nov 6th. The arms being taken from the Saints the mob now felt safe and were no longer militia. They formed themselves into companies and went forth on horseback armed to harass the saints and pick up all the arms they could find. Two of these companies were headed by Baptist priests. The Rev. Isaac McCoy headed one of about 60 or 70, the other's was about 30 or 40. They went through the different settlement[s] of the Saints threatening them with death and destruction if they were not off immediately... The mobs whipped and shot at some and others they hunted, for as they said to kill them. Such mobs well lined with whiskey were acting worse than savages."

Although he was involved in numerous projects on behalf of what he perceived as the best interest of Indians, McCoy was nearly destitute during much of the 1830s, taking in boarders and working as bookkeeper in a neighboring store. He hoped to be appointed as the government overseer of Indians. He lobbied in Washington and on the frontier seeking, unsuccessfully, for U.S. government recognition of the Indian lands as an official U.S. Territory.

While in Missouri, a slave state, in 1835 McCoy purchased a female slave named Chainy. He was opposed to slavery, saying that he had bought her to prevent her separation from her husband and children by being sold through a slave market. It appears he already owned her husband and children. In his will, he provided for her to be manumitted, on the condition that she pay his estate (or descendants) her purchase price of US$415 (equivalent to about $13,000 in 2025) plus interest. He also provided for her children (also his property) to be freed when each reached age 24.

In 1840, McCoy wrote one of the earliest, most personally informed reports on the Midwestern Native American tribes, The History of Baptist Indian Missions. After its publication, he was expelled from the Board of Missions and his work with the Secretary of War. In 1842, he returned to Louisville, Kentucky, where he was the founding secretary and the director of the Baptist American Indian Mission Association. He wrote additional works on tribes and missions. He was the sole representative from Kentucky at the formation of the Southern Baptist Convention in Augusta, Georgia, in 1845.

== Death ==
His will concluded, "My first care is for my family, my second is for the Indians, for both, I desire to labor while I live and to pray while I am dying." On a trip home to Louisville, he suffered an illness due to a severe rain storm. His final words included, "Tell the brethren, never to let the Indian mission decline." He died a few days later on June 21, 1846, aged 62, and was buried in Western Cemetery.

== Assessment ==
McCoy was much more of a social reformer than a missionary, hardly being concerned in his later years with converting Indians to Christianity. He "attacked the system of law and custom by which Indians had been kept in bondage" and "his object was to free the Indians from those restraints". His solution was to move the Indians beyond where they could be corrupted and exploited by Whites. But the tide of westward expansion in the United States was too strong and his plans failed. His biographer said that the vision of this rude, untutored preacher and pioneer was "somewhat breathtaking".

== Books ==
- The Autobiography of Isaac McCoy
- Periodical Account of Baptist Missions Within the Indian Territory For the Year Ending December 31, 1836
- History of the American Baptist African and Haytien Missions For the Use of Sabbath Schools
- History of Baptist Indian Missions
- Remarks on the Practicability of Indian reform, embracing their colonization
- Annual Register of Indian Affairs (1855–1888)
