= William Chick =

William Chick may refer to:

- William Miles Chick (1794–1847) American businessman and pioneer
- William Chick (architect) (1829-), see Ocle Pychard, Kenderchurch
- William Chick (footballer) played for Rochdale in the 1910s, see List of Rochdale A.F.C. players (25–99 appearances)
