= St. Paul's Episcopal Day School =

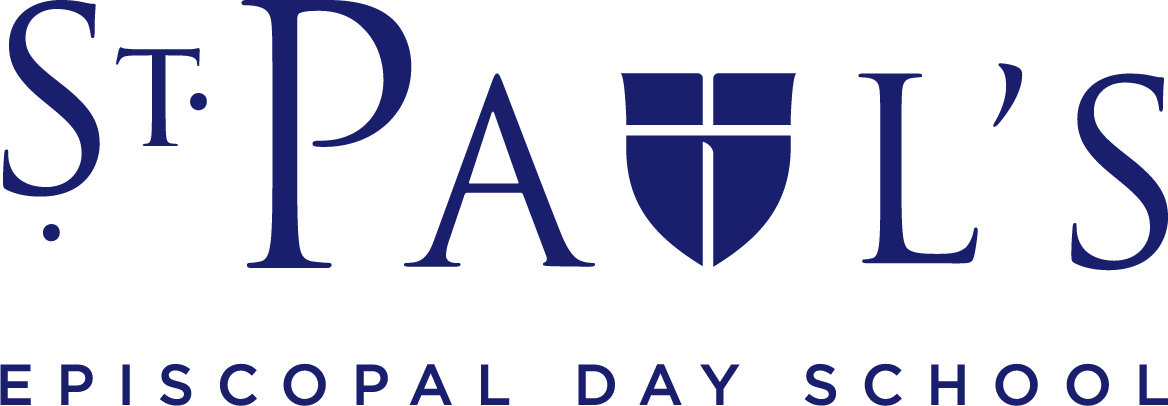
- St. Paul's Episcopal Day School logo

Location
- 4041 Main Street; Kansas City, Missouri 64111; United States

Information
- Denomination: Episcopalian
- Established: 1963
- Head of school: Andrew Myler
- Teaching staff: 40.3 (FTE) (as of 2007-08)
- Grades: Toddler-8
- Enrollment: 464 (as of 2007-08)
- Average class size: 17
- Student to teacher ratio: 9.0 (as of 2007-08)
- Campus size: 80,000 square feet or 7,432 square meters
- Sports: soccer, basketball, cross country and volleyball
- Mascot: Spartans
- Website: https://www.speds.org/

St. Paul's Episcopal Day School is a private primary school in Kansas City, Missouri. Established in 1963, the school serves students in toddler through eighth grade.

== History ==
Dr. Clifford R. Nobes, then the pastor of St. Paul's Episcopal Church, created the school in 1963. The school had a preschool in the church building with 43 students and 4 staff members. In 1970 the school purchased the former Rollins Elementary School building. The school burned down in 1992 after stage lights overheated and caught fire. Classes resumed in the Temple B'nai Jehudah. The school rebuilt a three-story brick building on the same midtown location in 1994.

== Campus ==
St. Paul's has been located in the Westport neighborhood since the school's establishment. The school's current building was completed in 1994 on the site of the school's former building, which burned down in 1992. A new wing was completed in January 2009.

== Athletics ==
St. Paul's is a part of the Crossroads League. Teams are divided evenly with no regards to skill for 5th and 6th graders. However, in 7th and 8th grade teams are formed based on skill level with the Gold Team as the most advanced.

The following sports are available to boys at St. Paul's Episcopal Day School:

Fall	Winter	Spring
Boys Soccer (5, 6/7/8)	Girls and Boys Basketball (5/6/7/8)	Girls Soccer (5/6/7/8)
Girls and Boys Cross Country		Running Club (5/6/7/8)

The following sports are available to girls at St. Paul's Episcopal Day School:

== Accreditation and memberships ==
St. Paul's Episcopal Day School is accredited or a member of the following organizations:

- Independent Schools Association of the Central States (ISACS)
- National Association of Independent Schools (NAIS)
- National Association of Episcopal Schools (NAES)
- Crossroads League*

*Sports

== Former headmasters ==
- Larry L. L'Heureux
- Terry Bartow (1994–2004)
