= List of the oldest buildings in Missouri =

This article lists the oldest extant buildings in Missouri, including extant buildings and structures constructed prior to and during the United States rule over Missouri. Only buildings built prior to 1800 are suitable for inclusion on this list, or the building must be the oldest of its type.

In order to qualify for the list, a structure must:

- be a recognizable building (defined as any human-made structure used or intended for supporting or sheltering any use or continuous occupancy);
- incorporate features of building work from the claimed date to at least 1.5 metres (4.9 ft) in height and/or be a listed building.

This consciously excludes ruins of limited height, roads and statues. Bridges may be included if they otherwise fulfill the above criteria. Dates for many of the oldest structures have been arrived at by radiocarbon dating or dendrochronology and should be considered approximate. If the exact year of initial construction is estimated, it will be shown as a range of dates.

== List of oldest buildings ==
Building	Image	Location	First built	Use	Notes
Louis Bolduc House		Ste. Genevieve, Missouri	ca. 1788 -1793	Residence	Considered the oldest house in Missouri. It is a poteaux-sur-sol (post-on-sill) house built by a French-Canadian settler, Louis Bolduc, in the late 18th century. It remained in the Bolduc family until 1949 when The National Society of the Colonial Dames of America in the State of Missouri purchased it. They opened it as a museum in 1958 after extensive restoration work. Currently operated as a part of the campus of The Center for French Colonial Life. It is listed on the National Register of Historic Places and is a National Historic Landmark.
Green Tree Tavern (Janis-Ziegler House)		Ste. Genevieve, Missouri	ca. 1790	Residence	The oldest house dated using dendrochronology in Missouri. It is a poteaux-sur-sol house built by Nicolas Janis and later used as a tavern and inn. It was the meeting place of the first Masonic Lodge west of the Mississippi River, Louisiana Lodge 109. It is currently a part of the Ste. Genevieve National Historic Park. The house is also listed on the National Register of Historic Places as a part of the National Historic Landmark Ste. Genevieve Historic District.
Casa Alvarez		Florissant, Missouri	ca. 1790	Residence	It was a frame house built for Eugenio Alvarez who was a member of the Spanish government in the Louisiana Territory. It is of the oldest houses in St. Louis County, Missouri. His descendants owned the house until 1905 when it was sold by Maria Alvarez. It was also notably the residence of Dr. Herman von Schrenk who invented a wood-preserving process for railroad ties. It is listed on the National Register of Historic Places and is a St. Louis County Landmark. Private residence
Aubuchon-Herbst House		Florissant, Missouri	ca. 1790	Residence	It is a poteaux-sur-sol house that was built for Joseph Aubuchon. This house is one of the oldest houses in St. Louis County, Missouri, and is most likely the last French vertical log house in the area. It is a St. Louis County Landmark. Private residence
Amoureux House		Ste. Genevieve, Missouri	ca. 1792	Residence	This house was built for Jean Baptiste Ste. Gemme Beauvais. It is one of five poteaux-en-terre (post-in-ground) left in the United States. It was bought by Pelagie and Benjamin Amoureux in 1852. Pelagie was a free woman of color and Benjamin was a white Frenchman. Their descendants owned the house until 1923. It is currently part of the Ste. Genevieve National Historic Park. It is listed on the National Register of Historic Places as a part of the National Historic Landmark Ste. Genevieve Historic District.
Vital Ste. Gemme Beauvais House		Ste. Genevieve, Missouri	ca. 1792	Residence	This house was built for Vital Ste. Gemme Beauvais a member of a prominent merchant family. It is one of five poteaux-en-terre houses in the United States. Henry Marie Brackenridge was a notable resident of this house during his studies in Ste. Genevieve. It is listed on the National Register of Historic Places as a part of the National Historic Landmark Ste. Genevieve Historic District. Private residence
Francois Valle II House		Ste. Genevieve, Missouri	ca. 1792	Residence	It is a poteaux-sur-sol house that was built by Francois Valle II. This building was an outbuilding of the larger Francois Valle House which is believed to have been destroyed in the New Madrid Earthquake. The house is a part of the Center for French Colonial Life's campus. It is listed on the National Register of Historic Places as a part of the National Historic Landmark Site. Genevieve Historic District.
Weber-Russ House		Potosi, Missouri	ca. 1792	Residence	The oldest building in Potosi, Missouri. A dog trot log cabin constructed by Thomas Russ. Private Residence
Jean-Baptiste Valle House		Ste. Genevieve, Missouri	ca. 1793	Residence	It is a poteaux-sur-sol house built for Jean Baptiste Valle, the most prominent resident of early Ste. Genevieve and its last commandant. The house is one of the finest examples of the blending of French and American architecture in the area. It currently serves as the headquarters of the Ste. Genevieve National Historic Park. It is listed on the National Register of Historic Places as a part of the National Historic Landmark Ste. Genevieve Historic District.
Chitwood-Prigge House		Spanish Lake, Missouri	ca. 1798	Residence	A log cabin constructed by Richard Chitwood. It is a St. Louis County Landmark. Private Residence
Austin-Milam-Lucas Store		Potosi, Missouri	ca. 1799	Commercial/ Residence	Encased within a larger historic building is a log building originally constructed by Moses Austin as a store and later a post office. It is currently owned by the Mine Au Breton Historical Society who has it open by appointment or during special events.
August Aubuchon House		Florissant, Missouri	ca. 1800	Residence	It is a log cabin built in the French colonial style by Auguste Aubuchon. It is widely considered the best-preserved example of French colonial architecture in St. Louis County and a jewel of Old Town Florissant. It is listed on the National Register of Historic Places. Private residence
Taille De Noyer		Florissant, Missouri	ca. 1800	Residence	It is a large country estate with the original log cabin being built by Hyacinth Dehetre. It was most notably owned by John Mullanphy and his descendants until 1960. When it was sold it was moved in order to save it from demolition. It is now a house museum operated by the Florissant Valley Historical Society on the grounds of McClure High School. It is listed on the National Register of Historic Places and is a St. Louis County Landmark.
Auguste Aubuchon House		Ste. Genevieve, Missouri	ca. 1800	Residence	It is a poteaux-sur-sol house built by Auguste Aubuchon. It is listed on the National Register of Historic Places as a part of the National Historic Landmark Ste. Genevieve Historic District. Private residence
Moses Austin Outbuilding		Ste. Genevieve, Missouri	ca. 1800	Residence	It is part of the complex of two buildings that were once owned by Moses Austin, father of Stephen Austin, in Ste. Genevieve until their sale in 1811. It is a poteaux-sur-sol style house. It is listed on the National Register of Historic Places as a part of the National Historic Landmark Ste. Genevieve Historic District. Private property
Daniel Boone Home		Defiance, Missouri	ca. 1802	Residence	Built by Boone's son Nathan sometime after his arrival in 1799. Daniel died in this house in 1820.
Bequette-Ribault House		Ste. Genevieve, Missouri	ca. 1808	Residence	It has been disputed to be much older than it has been dated by dendrochronology by notable historians and historic preservationists. It could date back to the 1770s. It is one of five poteaux-en-terre (post-in-ground) houses left in the United States. The first known owner of the house was Jean Baptiste Bequette. It was notably owned by Clarisse Ribault, a free woman of color, and her direct descendants from 1840 to 1981. Currently, it is owned by Chaumette Winery which gives tours of the house. It is listed on the National Register of Historic Places as a part of the National Historic Landmark Ste. Genevieve Historic District.
Thomas Sappington House		Crestwood, Missouri	ca. 1808	Residences	The oldest brick house in St. Louis County, Missouri. It was built by Thomas Sappington who was the most prominent member of the Sappington family who settled in St. Louis. It is listed on the National Register of Historic Places and is a St. Louis County Landmark.
Thomas Mason House		St. Louis County, Missouri	ca. 1808–1818	Residence	The oldest stone building in St. Louis County, Missouri. It was built by Thomas Mason who ran a successful farm estate and helped to establish the Bonhomme Presbyterian Church. It is a St. Louis County Landmark. Private residence
Gov. Frederick Bates "Thornhill" Estate		Chesterfield, Missouri	ca. 1817–1819	Residence	The oldest standing home of a Missouri Governor in the state. It was built as the home of Frederick Bates, the second Governor of Missouri, on a large estate. It is located in Faust Park on its original foundation and is open for tours given by park staff. It is listed on the National Register of Historic Places and is a St. Louis County Landmark.
Old McKendree Chapel		Jackson, Missouri	ca. 1819	Chapel	The oldest Protestant chapel in Missouri. It was built by members of the McKendree Class who were carpenters. It notably held the first session of the Missouri Annual Conference for the Methodist Church on Missouri soil the same year it was built. It is considered the heart of Methodism in Missouri and is a United Methodist National Historic Shrine. It is currently owned by the McKendree Chapel Memorial Association which maintains it and the grounds surrounding it.
Old St. Ferdinand Shrine		Florissant, Missouri	ca. 1819–1821	Church	The oldest Catholic church and convent in Missouri. The convent was built for the Society of the Sacred Heart which was being led to the St. Louis area by St. Rose Philippine Duchesne in 1818 to establish a school at the request of Bishop Dubourg. Mother Duchesne spent most of her life at this convent which would later be owned by the Sisters of Loretto. The church was built to replace a previous vertical log church. It is currently run by the Friends of Old St. Ferdinand as a museum and shrine dedicated to Mother Duchesne. It is listed on the National Register of Historic Places as a part of the St. Ferdinand's Shrine Historic District and is a St. Louis County Landmark.
Lewis Bissell Mansion		St. Louis, Missouri	ca. 1823–1828	Residence	The oldest building in St. Louis, Missouri. Built for Captain Lewis Bissell, brother of General Daniel Bissell, as his residence in what was then rural St. Louis County. It was saved from demolition in the mid-20th century and for years was the Bissell Mansion Restaurant & Murder Mystery Dinner Theatre. It is a St. Louis City Landmark. Private property
Poage-Arnold House “Three Gables”		Kansas City, Missouri	ca. 1824	Residence	The oldest house in Kansas City, Missouri. The house was originally built as a log cabin by the Poage family while the Arnold family built the brick portion of the house circa 1860. It is a Kansas City Landmark. Private residence
Old Cathedral		St. Louis, Missouri	ca. 1831–1834	Church	The oldest church in St. Louis, Missouri. It was designed by the architectural firm Laveille and Morton to replace a brick church that had been built from 1818 to 1821. It was built using Joliet limestone and was the most ornate church in St. Louis when it was completed. The church later survived the riverfront clearing for the St. Louis Arch grounds and is an active church to this day. It is listed on the National Register of Historic Places in the Jefferson National Expansion Memorial Historic District and is a St. Louis City Landmark.
Albert G. Boone Store		Kansas City, Missouri	ca. 1850	Commercial	The oldest brick commercial building in Kansas City, Missouri. It was built for George and William Ewing's wagon outfitting business. It was notably sold to Albert Gallatin Boone, grandson of Daniel Boone. Currently, it is home to Kelly's Westport Inn, an Irish pub. It is listed on the National Register of Historic Places and is a Kansas City Landmark.
Antioch Christian Church		Kansas City, Missouri	ca. 1859	Church	The oldest church in Kansas City, Missouri. Built for the Antioch Christian Church which was organized in 1853. It was later restored in 1968 and moved by the congregation which uses it for special events today. It is listed on the National Register of Historic Places and is a Kansas City Landmark.
Temple Beth El		Jefferson City, Missouri	ca. 1883	Synagogue	The oldest synagogue in Missouri and the oldest still in use by a congregation west of the Mississippi River. It was designed in 1882 by local architect Frank B. Miller for the congregation which was organized in 1879. It is listed on the National Register of Historic Places as a part of the Missouri State Capitol Historic District.

== See also ==
- National Register of Historic Places listings in Missouri
- List of National Historic Landmarks in Missouri
- List of historic houses in Missouri
- History of Missouri
- Oldest buildings in the United States
