= John Calvin McCoy =

American businessman (1811–1889)

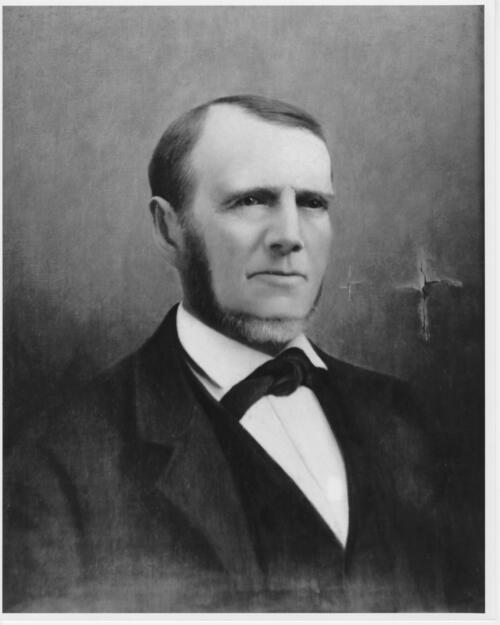
- Born: October 28, 1811; Vincennes, Indiana, US
- Died: October 2, 1889 (aged 77); Kansas City, Missouri, US
- Occupations: Land surveyor, missionary, entrepreneur
- Known for: Pioneer of West Port and Kansas City, Missouri
- Father: Isaac McCoy
- Relatives: William Miles Chick (grandfather-in-law); Dorothy McKibbin (granddaughter-in-law); Nathan Scarritt (father-in-law)

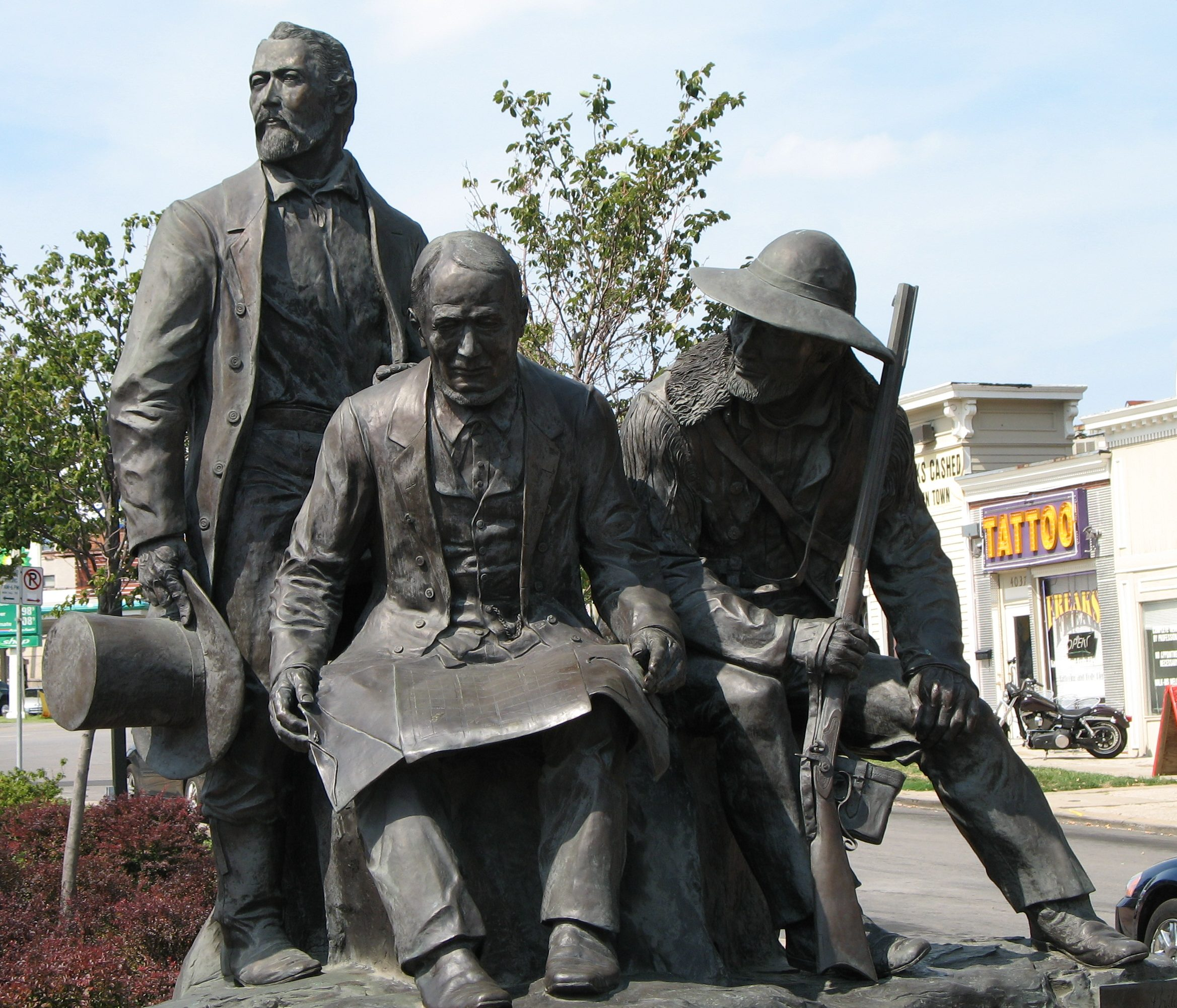
Sculptures of Alexander Majors, John Calvin McCoy, and mountain man James Bridger are at Pioneer Square in Westport in Kansas City.

John Calvin McCoy (September 28, 1811—September 2, 1889) was an American land surveyor, missionary, and entrepreneur. He is considered the "father of Kansas City".

== Early life ==
McCoy was born in Vincennes, Indiana on September 28, 1811. He studied as a land surveyor at Transylvania College in Lexington, Kentucky, during 1826–1827. He accompanied his parents Isaac and Christiana (Polk) McCoy to Kansas City to perform Baptist missionary work in 1830.

After Isaac's death in 1846, John and Christiana moved back to Jackson County where he continued his business ventures. Christiana died in 1850. A stream in Elkhart County, Indiana and a lake in Cass County, Michigan are named after her.

== Career ==
In 1833, John McCoy built a two-story cabin at what became 444 Westport Road on the northeast corner of Pennsylvania Avenue. He opened a store for travelers on the Santa Fe and Oregon trails. He named the area West Port because it was the last settlement before travelers ventured into the Territory of Kansas.

McCoy's store was four miles from the Missouri River in the hills away from the floodplain. He established a dock at a rocky point in the river between Main and Grand Street, which came to be called Westport Landing. He followed a trail that was to become Broadway to reach it.

The natural wharf became quite popular but the land surrounding it belonged to farmer Gabriel Prudhomme. After Prudhomme was murdered in 1831, his property was auctioned in 1838 to settle the estate. Fourteen people, including McCoy, bought the property by forming the Town of Kansas Company after the French description of the area, chez les Canses ("home of the Kansa" Indians). He platted it into 318 lots for sale. In 1853, when the town was officially charted by the state of Missouri, the English pronunciation of the French name was applied to the new City of Kansas, later renamed Kansas City.

Due to his sympathies with the Confederate States of America during the American Civil War, he was required to leave Kansas City by General Order No. 11 of 1863. His son Spencer enlisted in the Confederate Army and was killed in June 1863.

== Death and legacy ==
McCoy died on October 2, 1889, aged 77, in Kansas City, Missouri, and was interred in Union Cemetery.

A Kansas City Public Library historian said McCoy "single-handedly had the greatest effect on the development of early Kansas City". He founded Westport and is widely regarded as "the father of Kansas City". Pioneer Park is at Westport and Broadway, with a sculpture by Thomas L. Beard of Alexander Majors, John McCoy, and Jim Bridger.

Calvin was one of the founders of the Old Settlers' Historical Society, founded in 1871. His daughter, Eleanor (Nelly) McCoy Harris was known as one of Kansas City's first historians and writers.
