= Taille de Noyer =

- U.S. National Register of Historic Places
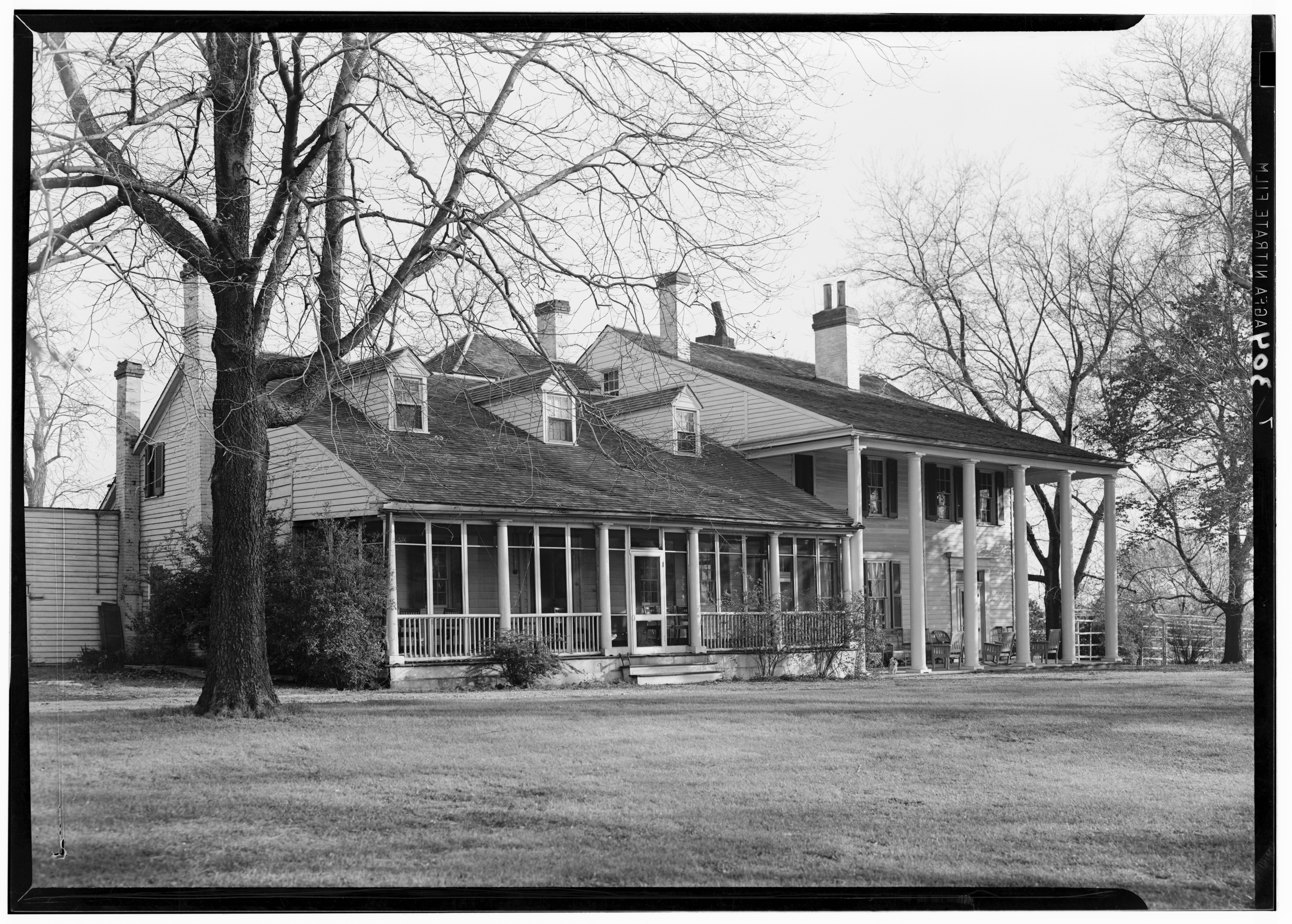

- Location within Missouri Location within the United States
- Location: 1 rue Taille de Noyer, Florissant, Missouri
- Coordinates: 38°46′17″N 90°18′36″W
- Area: less than one acre
- Built: 1800
- NRHP reference No.: 80004385
- Added to NRHP: January 10, 1980

Taille de Noyer (also known as Mullanphy-Chambers House) is a historic house at 1 rue Taille de Noyer in Florissant, Missouri.

It was built in 1800 as a two room log cabin and fur trading post and was eventually expanded into a 22-room mansion. The house was added to the National Register of Historic Places on January 10, 1980 It is one of the oldest houses in Missouri and is open for tours by the Florissant Historical Society.

== See also ==
- List of the oldest buildings in Missouri
