= Reverend Nathan Scarritt Home =

Historic house in Missouri, US

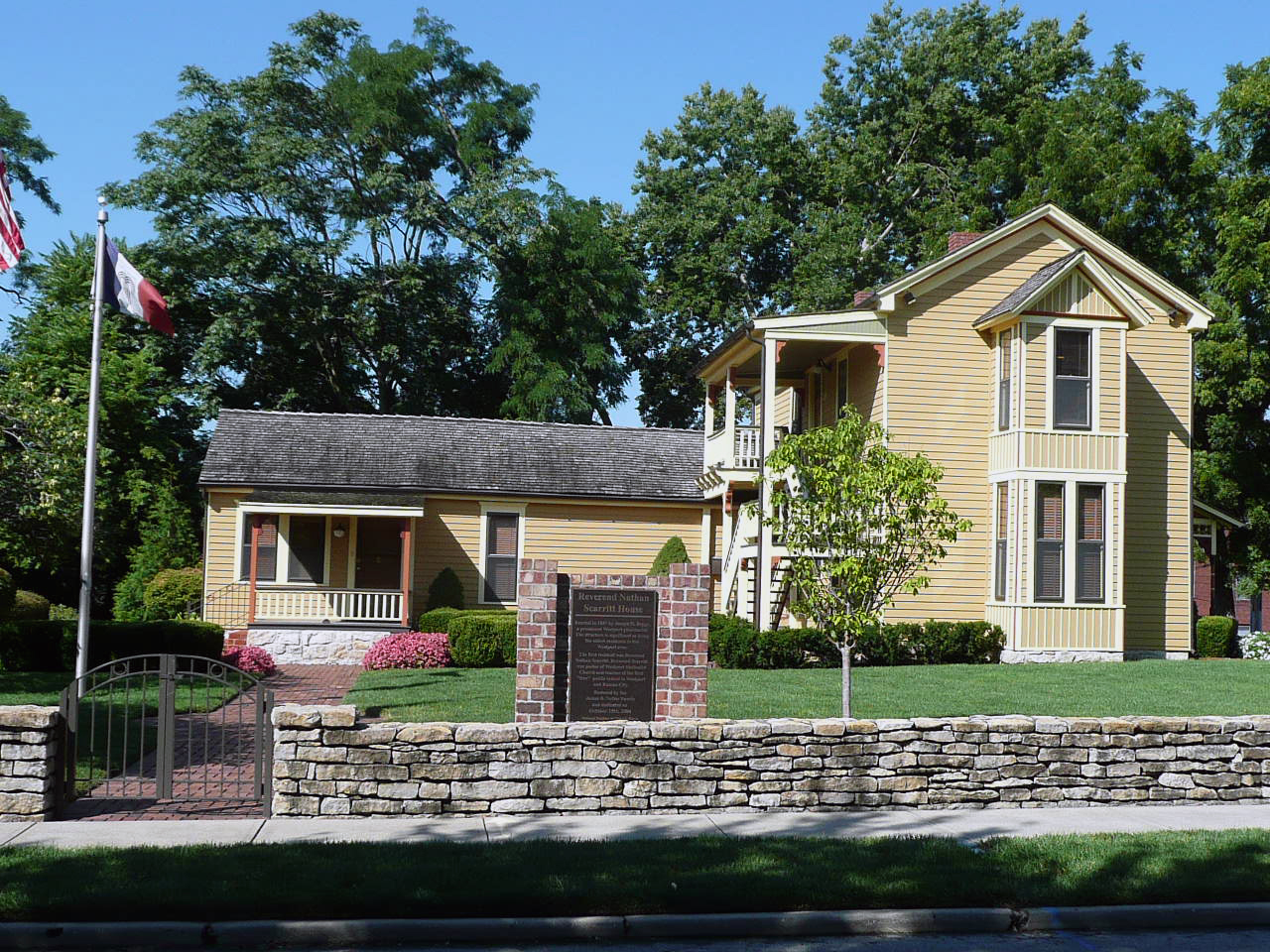
- The Reverend Nathan Scarritt Home in 2015

- Location within Missouri
- Location: Westport, Kansas City, Missouri, US
- Coordinates: 39.052480°N 94.588560°W
- Built: 1847–1853
- Architectural style: Colonial Revival

The Reverend Nathan Scarritt Home is a historic house in Westport, Kansas City, Missouri. It was owned by reverend Nathan Scarritt.

== History ==
In the 1850s, Nathan Scarritt moved to Kansas City and bought land from Lieutenant Joseph Boggs, and between 1847 and 1853, built an L-shaped two-story house for $2150. He lived in that house until 1862. The house is approximately 2,000 square feet, and is constructed of a limestone foundation, and a juglan clapboard painted olive-tan.

The house has been preserved by James B. Nutter & Company.

== See also ==
- William Chick Scarritt House
