= Casa Alvarez =

Historic house in Missouri, United States

- U.S. National Register of Historic Places
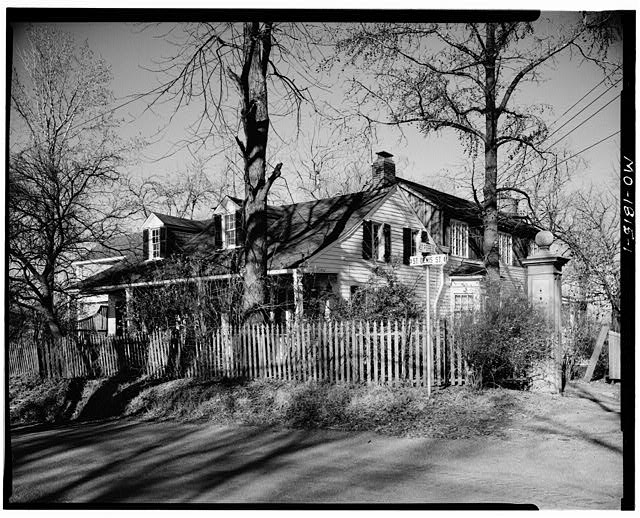
- Front view of Casa Alvarez, ca. 1950

- Location within Missouri
- Location: 289 Rue St. Denis, Florissant, Missouri
- Coordinates: 38°47′49″N 90°19′44″W
- Built: ca. 1790
- Architectural style: French Colonial
- NRHP reference No.: 76002180
- Added to NRHP: June 18, 1976

The Casa Alvarez is a wood-frame, French Colonial-style house in Florissant, Missouri listed on the National Register of Historic Places as among the oldest houses in St. Louis County. According to its nomination for the Register it "serves as a last link with the Spanish occupation of the Upper Louisiana territory." Located at 289 Rue St. Denis, it is surrounded by modern homes.

== Design and additions ==
The Casa Alvarez was built about 1790 in then-St. Ferdinand, a village made up of primarily Spanish and French Catholic settlers. Its original form consisted of one room with a large fireplace. Prior to 1840 the high ceiling was replaced with a second floor, part of the main room partitioned to create a staircase, and dormer and gable windows added. Three more rooms were added and a second fireplace built in 1840. A new dining room, kitchen and porches were added in the 1920s and 1930s. The home has a full basement. At an unknown point a first-floor bathroom was installed.

== Ownership history ==
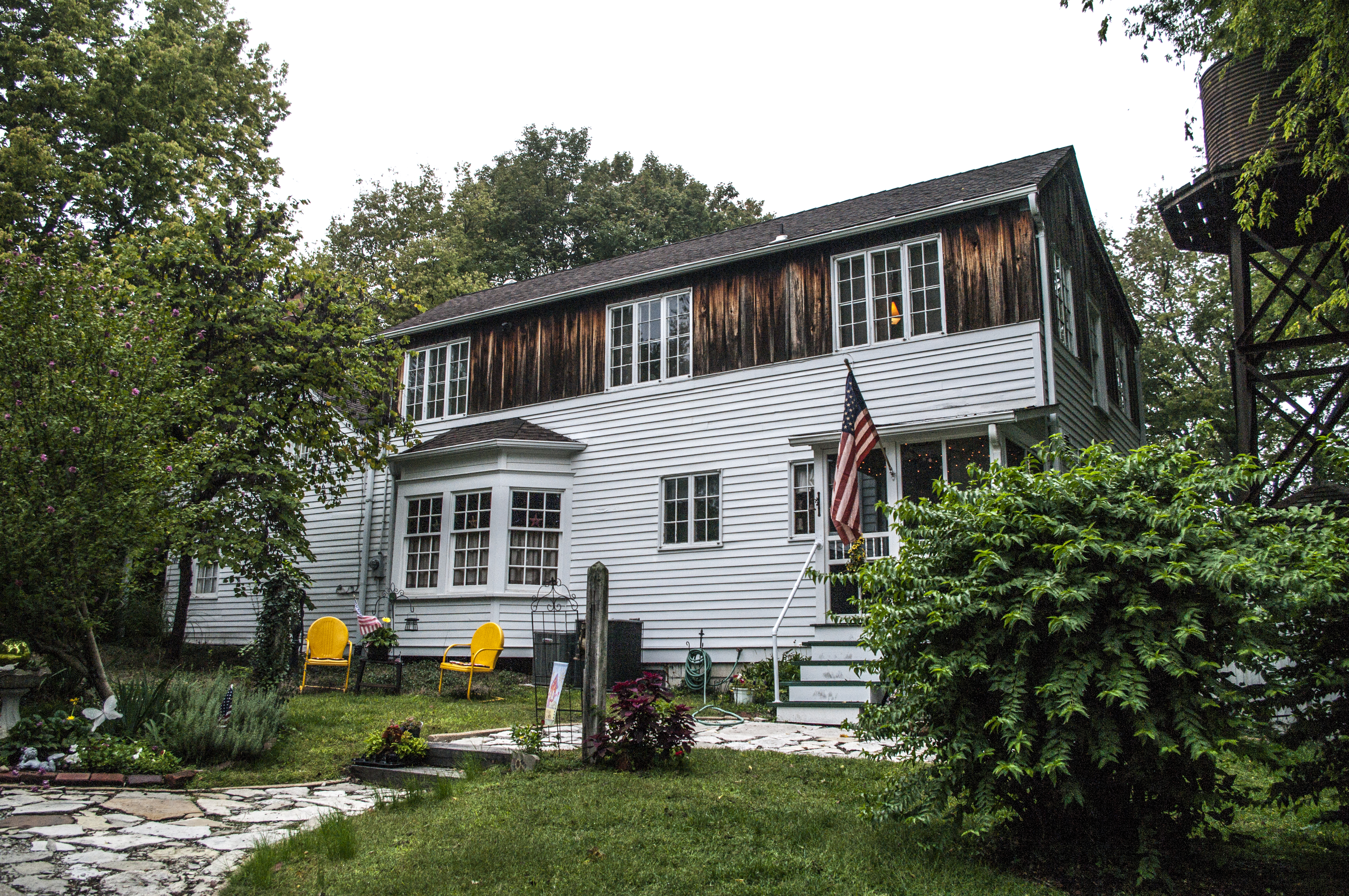
Casa Alvarez in 2012

The house originally was constructed for Eugenio Alvarez, who came to St. Ferdinand in about 1770 at age 36 as a soldier serving under Pedro Piernas, the Spanish lieutenant governor of Upper Louisiana. He continued his service as a military storekeeper and became acquainted with Pierre Laclede and Pierre Chouteau, among other early settlers. Alvarez passed the home to his son, Auguste, sometime in the 1840s.

The house remained in the Alvarez family until 1905, when it passed to Humphrey Moynihan (a mayor of Florissant). Moynihan sold it in 1910 to Auguste Archambault Jr. It was purchased in 1914 by Hermann von Schrenk, who owned the home through 1955. A botanist with a particular interest in the lumber industry, Von Schrenk introduced coating railroad ties in creosote in the United States. The von Schrenk family restored the house and added significantly to its gardens.

During the 1960s the house was purchased by Harold Zimmerman. In 1976 it was listed on the National Register of Historic Places.

== See also ==
- List of the oldest buildings in Missouri
