= Kelly's Westport Inn =

- U.S. National Register of Historic Places
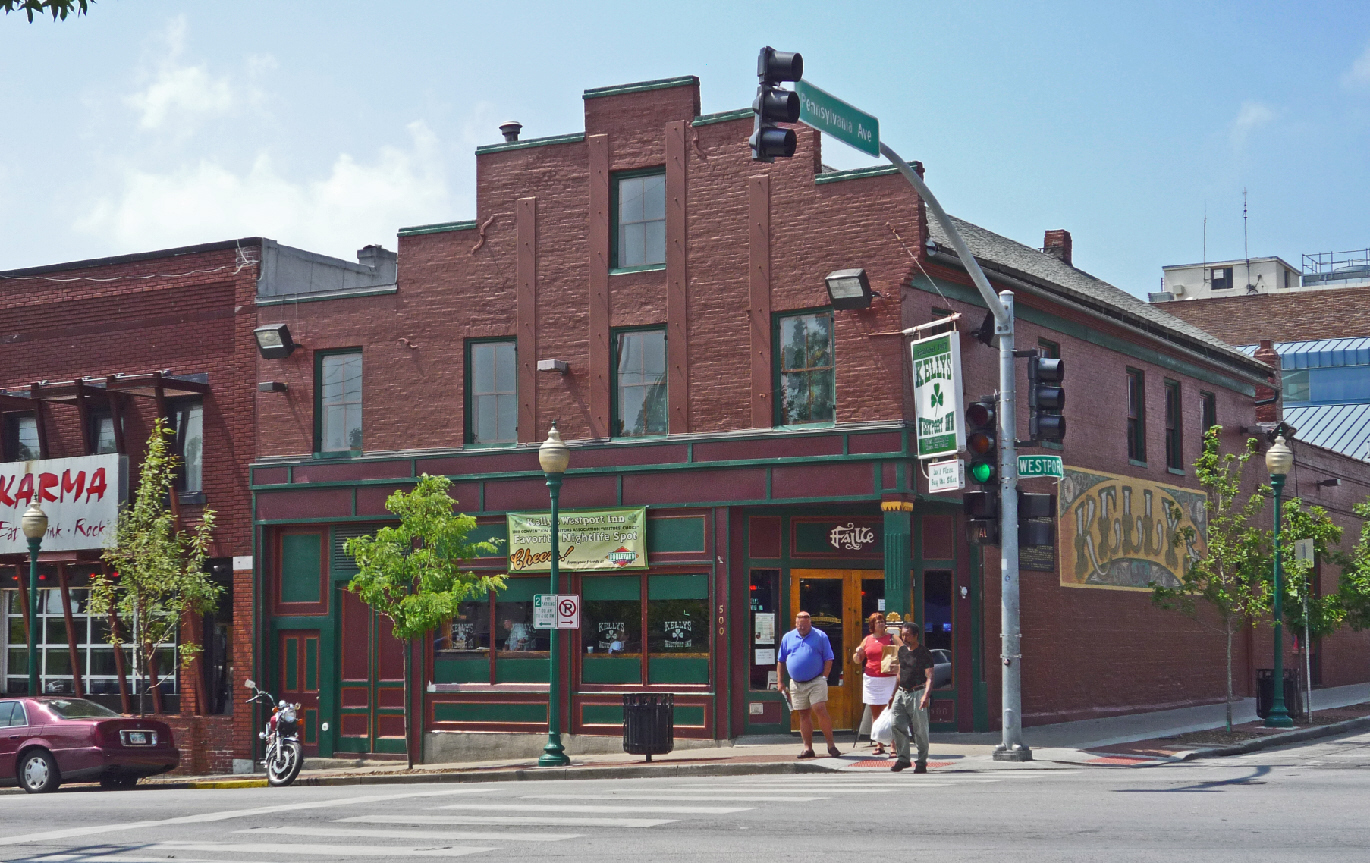
- Location: 500–504 Westport Road, Kansas City, MO
- Coordinates: 39°3′8.96″N 94°35′29.02″W
- Built: 1850; 176 years ago
- NRHP reference No.: 72000718
- Added to NRHP: September 7, 1972

Kelly's Westport Inn is a historical bar in Westport, Kansas City, Missouri, constructed around 1850. Kelly's and the adjoining Chouteau Store are considered to be one of the oldest buildings still standing in Kansas City. Mabry Hall at 4112 Pennsylvania Avenue is seven years older than Kelly's.

== History ==
The grandson of Daniel Boone, Albert Gallatin Boone, operated a grocery store. A story about the Underground Railroad alleges that a southbound tunnel connects to a stable which is now also a bar called the Westport Saloon.

Around 1900, the Wiedenmann family operated a grocery there, which catered to Kansas City's elite. With the repeal of Prohibition, Phil Taggart rented the building and opened a saloon named the Wrestlers Inn. A few years later, Randal Kelly, born in County Clare, Ireland, became a bartender. He soon became a partner.

In 1959, the building was designated a national historic landmark.

In 1969, Kelly's Inn was registered as a historic building. The tunnel only connects two basements and there was no Underground Railroad association.

In 1996, Kansas City native Eddie Griffin used Kelly's as the inspiration for the setting of his sitcom Malcolm & Eddie, starring himself and Malcolm-Jamal Warner.

== See also ==
- List of the oldest buildings in Missouri
