= Dorothy McKibbin =

Manhattan Project project manager (1897–1985)

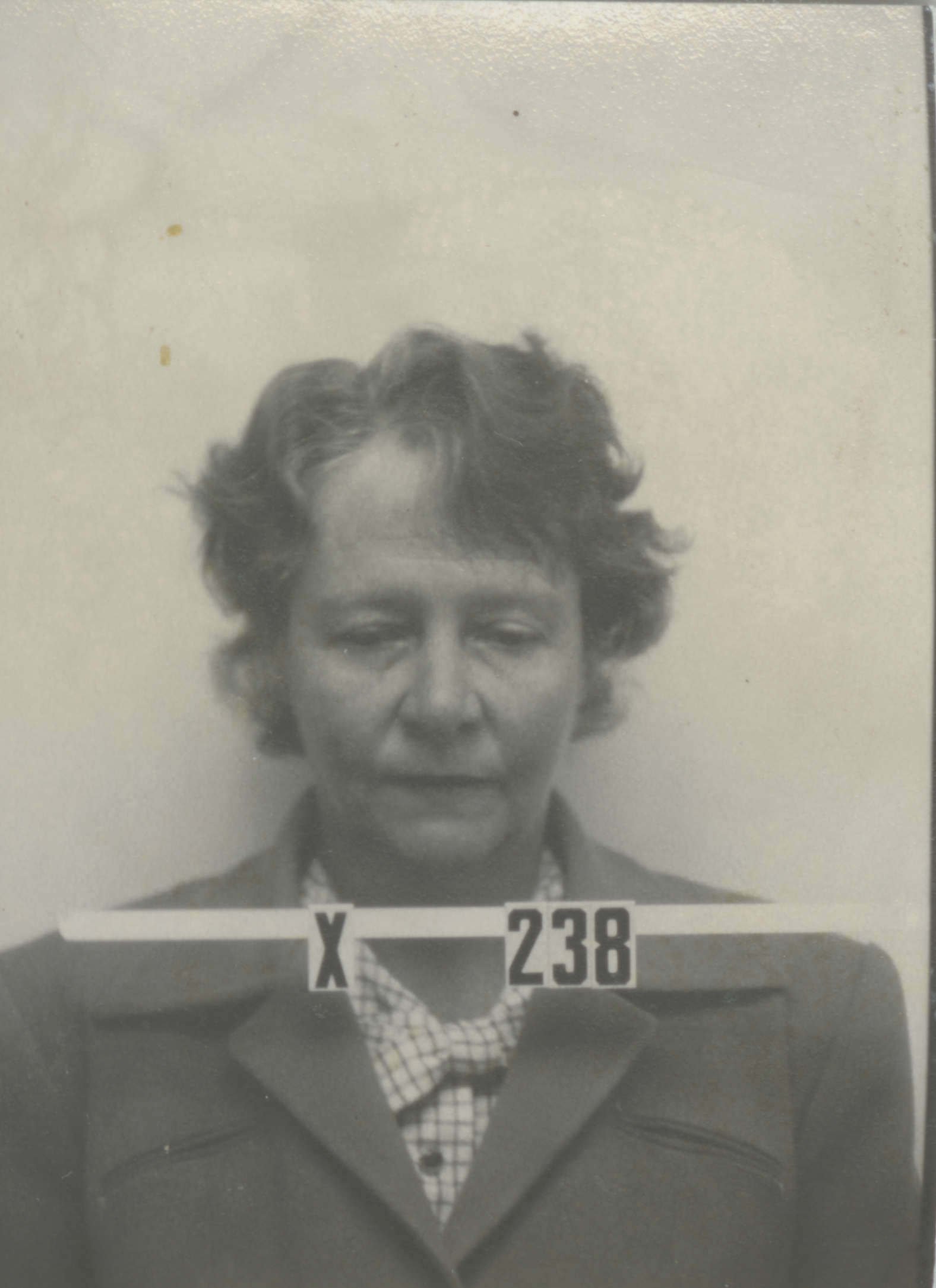
- Los Alamos badge photo
- Born: Dorothy Scarritt; December 12, 1897; Kansas City, Missouri, US
- Died: December 17, 1985 (aged 88); Santa Fe, New Mexico, US
- Education: Smith College (BA)
- Father: William Chick Scarritt
- Family: Nathan Scarritt (grandfather); William Miles Chick (great-grandfather); John Calvin McCoy (grandfather-in-law); Isaac McCoy

Dorothy McKibbin (née Scarritt; December 12, 1897 – December 17, 1985) worked on the Manhattan Project during World War II. She ran the project's office at 109 East Palace Avenue in Santa Fe, through which staff moving to the Los Alamos Laboratory had to pass through to obtain security credentials and directions to their new workplace. She was known as the "first lady of Los Alamos", and was often the first point of contact for new arrivals. She retired when the Santa Fe office closed in 1963.

== Early life ==
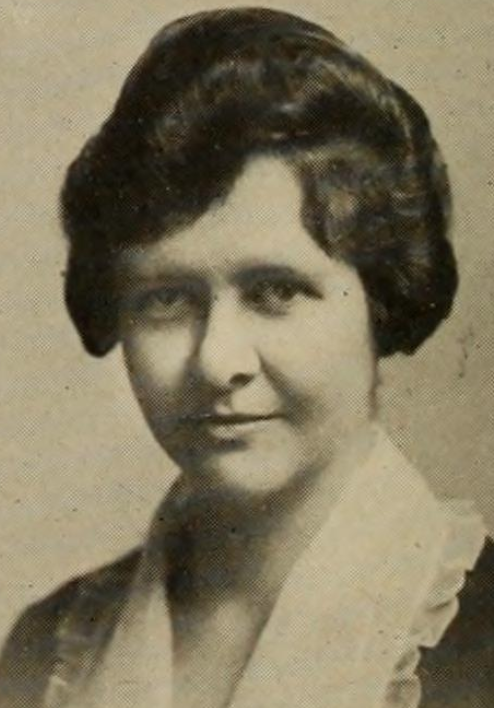
Dorothy A. Scarritt, from the 1919 yearbook of Smith College

Dorothy Ann Scarritt was born in Kansas City, Missouri, on December 12, 1897, the fourth of five children of William Chick Scarritt, a corporate lawyer, and his wife Frances Virginia (née Davis). Her grandfather was pastor Nathan Scarritt, and her great-grandfather was William Miles Chick. She had two older brothers, William Hendrix (known as Bill) and Arthur Davis (known as A.D.), and an older sister, Frances. A younger sister, Virginia, died in 1907. Dorothy was known as Dink to her family and close friends.

The family believed strongly in the value of education. Scarritt attended The Barstow School, a small independent preparatory school in Kansas City, where she was editor of the school literary magazine, a member of the drama group, and played forward on the school basketball team. She graduated in 1915, and later that year entered Smith College, a liberal arts college in Northampton, Massachusetts. At the time it was the largest of the Women's colleges in the United States. She considered majoring in English and history, ultimately settling on the latter. She was elected class president in her first year. She participated in the Smith College Association for Christian Work, and the Sociology and Current Events Clubs, and helped raise $25,000 for refugees from World War I. She enjoyed tennis, swimming, hiking and mountain climbing, and played on a class basketball team, and for the All-Smith baseball team.

After graduating from Smith in 1919, Scarritt travelled to Europe with her father in 1921, and then to Alaska, western Canada and Yosemite National Park in 1923. In September 1923, she met Joseph Chambers McKibbin while visiting a Smith College friend in Dellwood, Minnesota. She toured Quebec, Newfoundland, Nova Scotia and the Thousand Islands in 1924, and in 1925 went with her father to Cuba, Panama, Peru, Chile and Argentina. Scarritt and Joseph McKibbin became engaged, but after she returned from South America in 1925 she was diagnosed with tuberculosis, a disease from which her sister Frances had died in 1919, and she broke off their engagement.

== New Mexico ==
As there were no effective drugs to treat the contagious disease, tuberculosis patients were sent to sanatoria, where they either recovered or died. The sunshine and dry climate of the southwestern states was considered conducive to recovery, and several sanatoria were located there. The family chose Sunmount near Santa Fe, New Mexico, a sanatorium that was more like a resort than a hospital. Scarritt arrived with her mother in November 1925 to find that Sunmount had a waiting list for admissions. After some lobbying, she was admitted on December 9, 1925. She fell in love with both the landscape and the culture of New Mexico. After a year, she was pronounced cured, and left on December 22, 1927.

Scarritt and Joseph renewed their engagement, and were married in the garden of her family's home in Kansas City on October 5, 1927. After a honeymoon in Rio de Janeiro, they moved to St. Paul, Minnesota, where Joseph worked in his father's fur business, McKibbin, Driscoll and Dorsey. They had a son, Kevin, who was born on December 6, 1930, but Joseph was diagnosed with Hodgkin lymphoma, and died on October 27, 1931.

Now a single mother, McKibbin chose to return to Santa Fe. She loaded her possessions into a Ford Model A, and accompanied by Kevin and Joseph's sister Maggie, drove there. It was almost a month before they arrived on June 11, 1932. Between the Great Depression and the Dust Bowl drought, jobs were hard to find, but McKibbin found employment as a bookkeeper for the Spanish and Indian Trading Company, a small firm that sold handicrafts and artworks. The owners, Norman McGee and Jim McMillan left the day-to-day running of the business in the hands of McKibbin, whom they paid 50c an hour.

McKibbin gave up her job in May 1935 to spend more time with Kevin. Her father lost most of his money in the Great Depression, but he still had enough to help her buy a house. Instead of buying, McKibbin decided to build. On April 21, 1936, she purchased 1.5 acres (0.61 ha) not far from Sunmount. She designed her house with Katherine Stinson, an aviator that she had met as a fellow patient at Sunmount. They based the design on that of 19th-century Spanish farmhouses and ranches in the area. The house was furnished with antique fittings acquired through the Spanish and Indian Trading Company. Land and construction costs totalled $10,000. Her father was a frequent visitor, overseeing various stages of construction.

In 1937, Kevin was diagnosed with endocarditis, a potentially life-threatening disease. There was no treatment for it but bed rest, so he spent the entire 1937–38 school year in bed. Her father died from bronchial pneumonia on February 16, 1938. In 1938, she took Kevin to the Children's Hospital Los Angeles, along with her mother and her aunt Nana. The doctors there told them that Kevin had been misdiagnosed, and actually had tonsillitis. The tonsils were removed, and he left cured. When he started school again, McKibbin returned to her old job at the Spanish and Indian Trading Company.

== Manhattan Project ==
After the outbreak of World War II, the owners of the Spanish and Indian Trading Company decided to switch to war-related opportunities, and in 1943 the company closed down, putting McKibbin out of a job. Then in March 1943, she was approached by three men from California seeking to establish a new office in Santa Fe, who offered to hire her as a secretary. She was particularly impressed by one of them. She later wrote:

I thought to be associated with that person, whoever he was, would be simply great! I never met a person with a magnetism that hit you so fast and so completely as his did. I didn't know what he did. I thought maybe if he were digging trenches to put in a new road, I would love to do that, or if he were soliciting ads for a magazine or something, I would love to do that. I just wanted to be allied and have something to do with a person of such vitality and radiant force.

The man was Robert Oppenheimer, a professor from the University of California at Berkeley, establishing a new, secret laboratory for the Manhattan Project, the wartime effort to build an atomic bomb. McKibbin became the first permanent employee of the Manhattan Project's Santa Fe office, which opened at 109 East Palace Avenue on March 27, 1943. The office had just five rooms, all purposely small so they could be easily heated in winter with small fireplaces. Joe Stephenson handled housing; Duane Muncy, the comptroller from the University of California was business manager; Dana Mitchell, a chemistry professor from Columbia University was in charge of scientific supplies. Oppenheimer was in charge, assisted by his secretary, Priscilla Greene. When Edward Condon and his secretary Isabel Bemis arrived from Berkeley, they had to be squeezed in. Greene bought a typewriter in Santa Fe with her own money. McKibbin's salary was $150 per month. Initially Stephenson paid it out of petty cash. She subsequently was made an employee of the University of California.

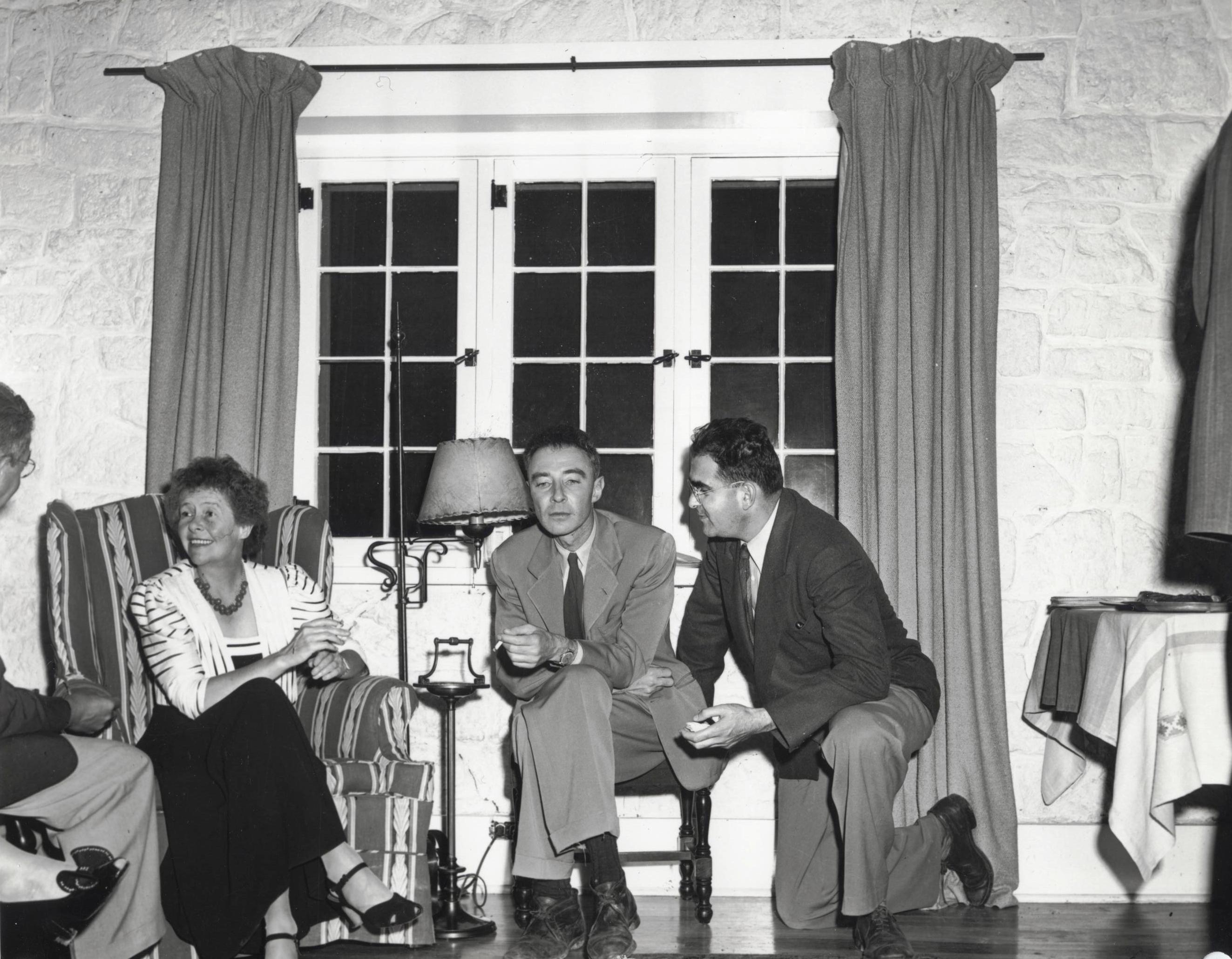
Isidor Isaac Rabi, Dorothy McKibbin, J. Robert Oppenheimer and Victor Weisskopf at Oppenheimer's home in Los Alamos in 1944

At first, McKibbin was unsure what they wanted her to do. Her duties evolved over time. She became Oppenheimer's deputy in Santa Fe, and ran the housing office, which was nothing more than a front for the top secret laboratory under construction 35 miles (56 km) away. This became the Los Alamos Laboratory, but the name was never used in Santa Fe. It was simply "the Hill". She was acquainted with Los Alamos, being friends with the poet and author Peggy Pond Church, the daughter of Ashley Pond, the founder of the Los Alamos Ranch School there.

To protect the secrecy of the Hill (and the entire Manhattan Project), new employees were never provided before their departure for New Mexico with its exact location or the security credentials they would need to gain access to the site. Instead, they were merely given a memorandum which blandly instructed them to report to the United States Army Corps of Engineers office at 109 East Palace Avenue in Santa Fe. There, McKibbin would meet new arrivals, and issued them passes without which they would not get past the guards. She came to be known as "the gatekeeper to Los Alamos", and the "first lady of Los Alamos", Before she left work each night, she had to burn every scrap of paper produced during the day.

McKibbin was on call 24 hours a day, and Oppenheimer would often phone her in the middle of the night. Frequently her house was overrun by guests. She later recalled that:

There was never a dull moment. The office was a madhouse. It was bedlam. We worked six days a week but even so I couldn't wait to get back to work in the morning. There were always people who needed attention — they were hungry, exhausted, in a hurry.

By May 1943, there was a telephone line to Los Alamos, and enough facilities has been constructed to allow Oppenheimer and his staff to move there. He offered McKibbin a position at Los Alamos but she declined, and remained in Santa Fe, running the office at 109 East Palace. Her duties remained many and various. She looked after children and pets, guarded briefcases and secret papers. She was the one the residents of Los Alamos turned to when they needed a puppy, a goose for Oppenheimer's Christmas dinner, or a doctor who performed abortions. Laura Fermi recalled that:

Dorothy McKibbin stayed calm and unruffled surrounded by large boxes and crates to be hauled by truck to the mesa and by the piles of small parcels that shopping women dumped on the floor to make room for further purchases in their bags. All women brought their difficulties and their checks to Dorothy. She endorsed the latter so they could be cashed at the bank, and smoothed out the first: Yes, she knew of a boys' camp; Yes, she could recommend a good eating place; Yes, she could arrange for a ride to the mesa later in the evening; Yes, she would try to get reservations for a good hotel in Albuquerque; Yes, she could give them the key to the ladies' room.

Marriages were performed at McKibbin's house. Greene married Robert Duffield in a ceremony there on September 5, 1943. McKibbin had a local judge conduct the ceremony, but due to the project's security, he was not allowed to know the surnames of the couple. It was the first of a series of weddings. Just three weeks later everyone assembled again for the wedding of Greene's bridesmaid, Marjorie Hall, to Hugh Bradner. About thirty weddings were held there, including that of Peter Oppenheimer, Robert's son.

In May 1944, Oppenheimer gave McKibbin another assignment. The numbers of staff at Los Alamos had greatly expanded, and the dormitories intended to house them were unfinished. Another eighty people were expected to arrive over the summer. The Army had taken over the Frijoles Canyon Lodge in the Bandelier National Monument and McKibbin was asked to prepare it to receive them. She had no experience running a hotel but left the Santa Fe office in the hands of an assistant for six weeks and took up residence at the Lodge in June 1944. With help from the Army and women she brought in she was able to prepare it for occupation in five days. When the expected numbers did not arrive, she turned it into a rest resort for Los Alamos scientists. Perhaps her most unusual assignment though, was scanning the skies for signs of Japanese fire balloons.

On July 15, 1945, two couples arrived at 109 East Palace and asked McKibbin to join them for an evening picnic on Sandia Peak near Albuquerque. At 5:30 am the next morning, she watched the sky light up from the Trinity nuclear test.

== Later life ==
After the war ended in August 1945, there were doubts as to whether the Los Alamos Laboratory would remain, not to mention the Santa Fe office. Now McKibbin was arranging people's departures. No one was sadder to see Oppenheimer depart on October 16, 1945. His successor, Norris Bradbury, agreed to take over the director's position for six months. He would remain for 25 years. He kept the laboratory open, and retained the Santa Fe office, with McKibbin as its head.

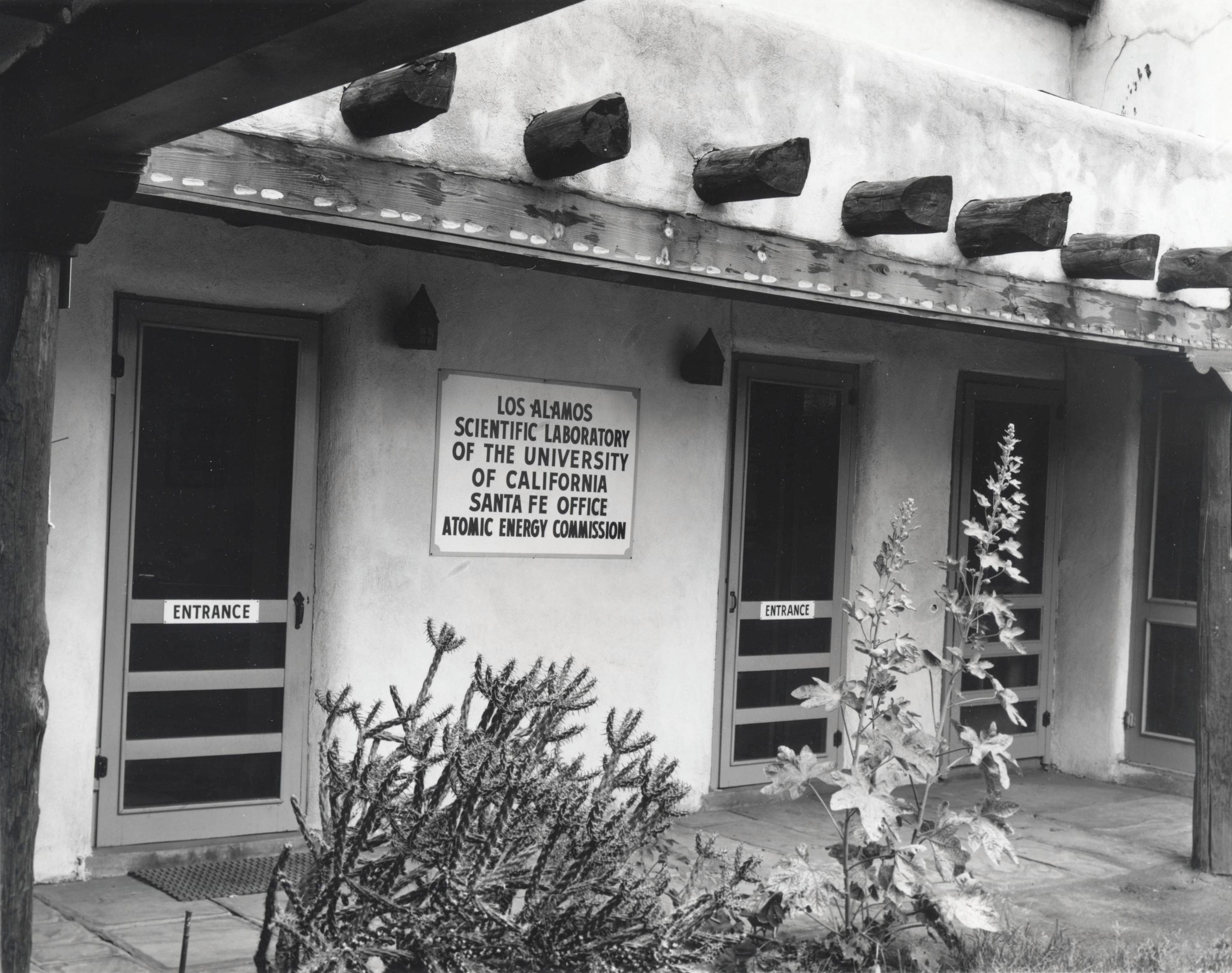
Entrance to the Santa Fe office in the 1950s

On June 7, 1949, McKibbin was in Washington, D.C., for a Smith College reunion, and went to watch Oppenheimer appear before the House Un-American Activities Committee, sitting beside Anne Wilson Marks, who had succeeded Priscilla Greene as Oppenheimer's secretary at the Los Alamos Laboratory. In May 1950, Sylvia Crouch alleged that Oppenheimer had conducted secret communist meetings at his home in Berkeley in July 1941. McKibbin conducted a meticulous investigation that produced a detailed paper trail demonstrating that Oppenheimer was in Santa Fe at the time. In April and May 1954, the Atomic Energy Commission conducted the Oppenheimer security hearing, which resulted in the loss of Oppenheimer's security clearance. When Edward Teller, who had testified against Oppenheimer, next appeared at Los Alamos, McKibbin gave him an icy reception.

The Santa Fe office closed on June 28, 1963, and McKibbin retired. There was a brief ceremony conducted by Bradbury, who presented a memorial plaque. When Oppenheimer was awarded the Atomic Energy Commission's Enrico Fermi Award in 1963, he invited McKibbin to join him at the White House reception. She intended to do so, but the assassination of President John F. Kennedy, whom she had met when he toured Los Alamos on December 7, 1962, cast a pall over the event, and she decided not to attend. Oppenheimer received the award from the new President, Lyndon B. Johnson.

McKibbin's eyesight began to fail in the 1950s. She had cataract operations in 1952, and thereafter needed to wear thick glasses. She died at her home in Santa Fe on December 17, 1985, aged 88, and was buried in the Santa Fe Memorial Gardens. Dorothy McKibbin Hall at the Los Alamos Historical Museum is named after her. The entrance to the hall is the actual gate that was at 109 East Palace.
