= Kenneth Scarratt =

British gemologist (born 1948)

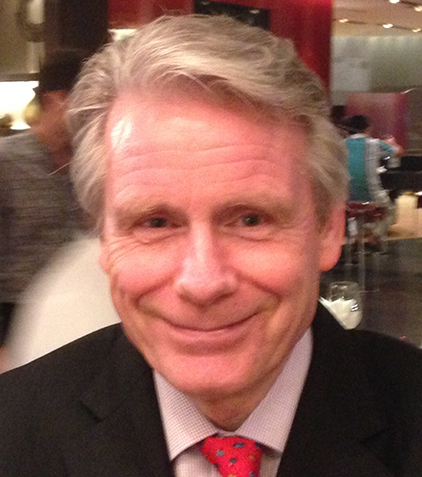
Gemologist & Pearl authority Kenneth Scarratt on Aug. 27, 2014

Kenneth Scarratt (born 1948) is a British gemologist, pearl expert, authority on the British crown jewels, and the director for South East Asia of the Gemological Institute of America and GIA Research Center in Bangkok, Thailand

Scarratt has authored or co-authored articles in many gemological magazines and journals worldwide, and has co-authored two books: The Pearl and the Dragon. A Study of Vietnamese Pearls and a History of the Oriental Pearl Trade, and The Crown Jewels: The History of the Coronation Regalia in the Jewel House of the Tower of London.

Scarratt is currently CEO of DANAT, the Royally sponsored authority on precious gems and natural pearls in Bahrain.

== History ==
Prior to taking over GIA in Bangkok, Scarratt was laboratory director of the American Gem Trade Association's (AGTA) Gem Testing Center (GTC) in New York, beginning in 1998. In a career spanning more than 30 years, Scarratt has also served as Director of Laboratory Services, Education, and Research for The Asian Institute of Gemological Services (Bangkok) and Chief Executive and Laboratory Director of The Gem Testing Laboratory of Great Britain.

== British Crown Jewels ==
The (British) Royal Household's representatives realized there was no definitive text on the Crown Jewels and the regalia. There have been some books about the Crown Jewels written, but all of those texts were never written from first-hand knowledge. So, a group of specialists headed by Scarratt were brought in to write the book. According to Scarratt, it took six years to write the book, from its inception to the completion of the work, and an extra five years to see it printed as a gilt-edged, two-volume, 1,440-page tome.

== Natural Pearls ==
Scarratt is considered by many in the gem and jewelry industry media to be one of the leading pearl authorities in the world. He has extensive experience in the research and identification of a broad range of pearl materials and detection of treatments. His expertise on saltwater and freshwater natural pearls includes the rare Melo pearl. In 1999, Scarratt co-authored The Pearl & the Dragon – which is the definitive study of Oriental pearls.

== Bahrain ==
In 2017, at the instigation of HRH Crown Prince Shaikh Salman bin Hamad Al Khalifa, Scarratt established Danat, the pioneering authority on precious gems on Bahrain, where he is the current CEO and Natural Pearl expert.
