= Westport, Kansas City, Missouri =

Neighborhood of Kansas City, Missouri, U.S.

Westport
- Neighborhood
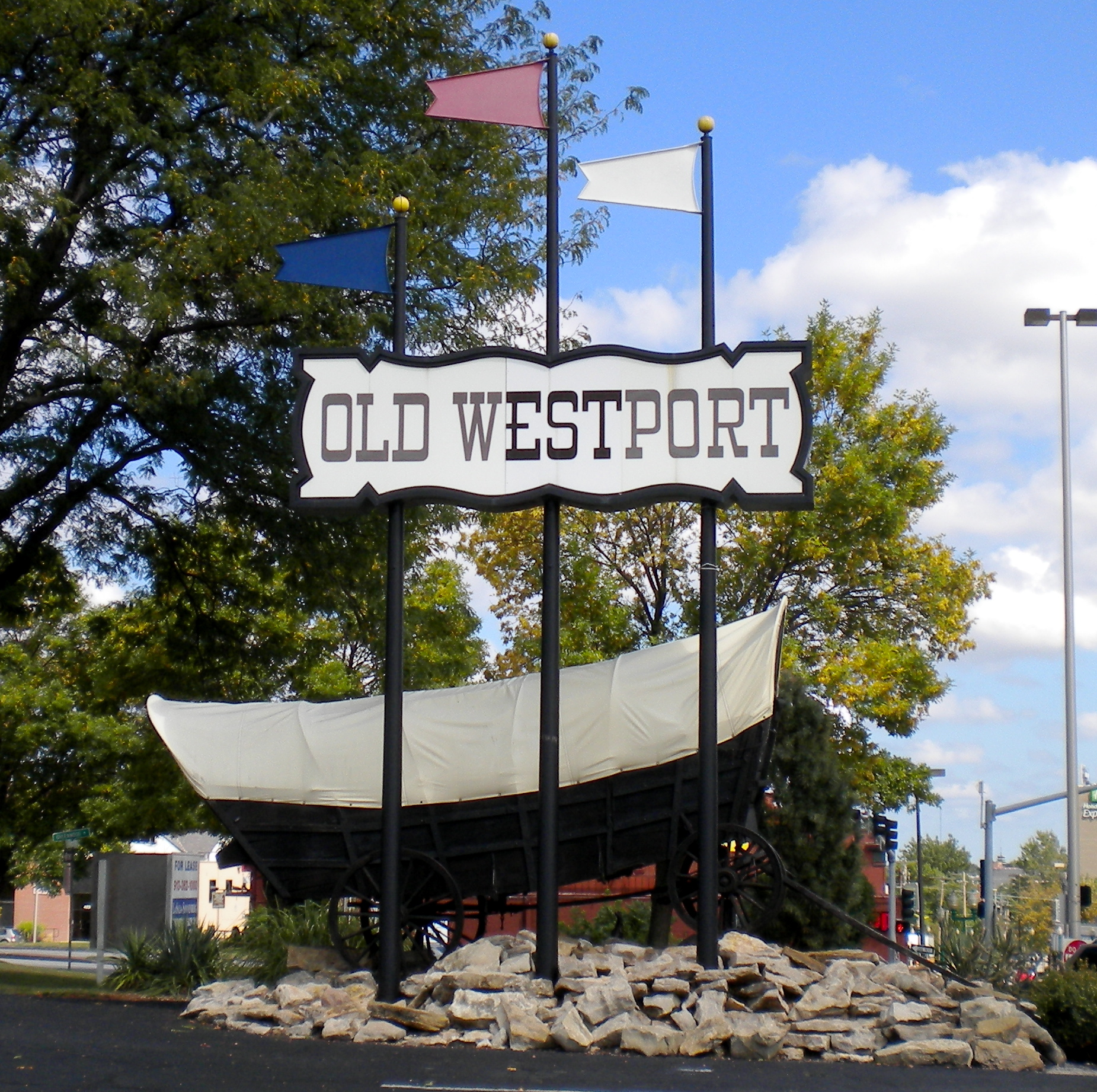
- Wagon trail replica in Westport
- Interactive map of Westport
- Coordinates: 39°3′12″N 94°35′31″W
- Country: United States
- State: Missouri
- County: Jackson
- Website: https://westportkcmo.com/

Westport is a historic neighborhood and a main entertainment district in Kansas City, Missouri.

In the early 19th century, West Port was settled by a group led by American pioneer and tribal missionary Reverend Isaac McCoy, who brought his son John Calvin McCoy as surveyor, and his son-in-law Reverend Johnston Lykins who bought the land. To compete with Independence to the east, and with veteran pioneering trader François Chouteau to the north, John McCoy forged a road from West Port four miles (6.4 km) north to a Missouri River landing rock next to Chouteau's landing. McCoy's West Port Landing soon combined in the 1830s with Chouteau's Town atop the levee bluff to form the settlement called Kansas. That was incorporated as the City of Kansas, which allied with the shared origin of West Port and boomed. West Port became a gateway to the westward expansion trails through Kansas Territory, and for border ruffians into Bleeding Kansas. It suffered the American Civil War's Battle of Westport in October 1864, and wagon trails became obsolete to distant railroads, so West Port declined to rural town status. The City of Kansas became Kansas City in 1889, which annexed Westport in 1897. Historical sites include Kelly's Westport Inn, the oldest surviving building in Kansas City.

== History ==
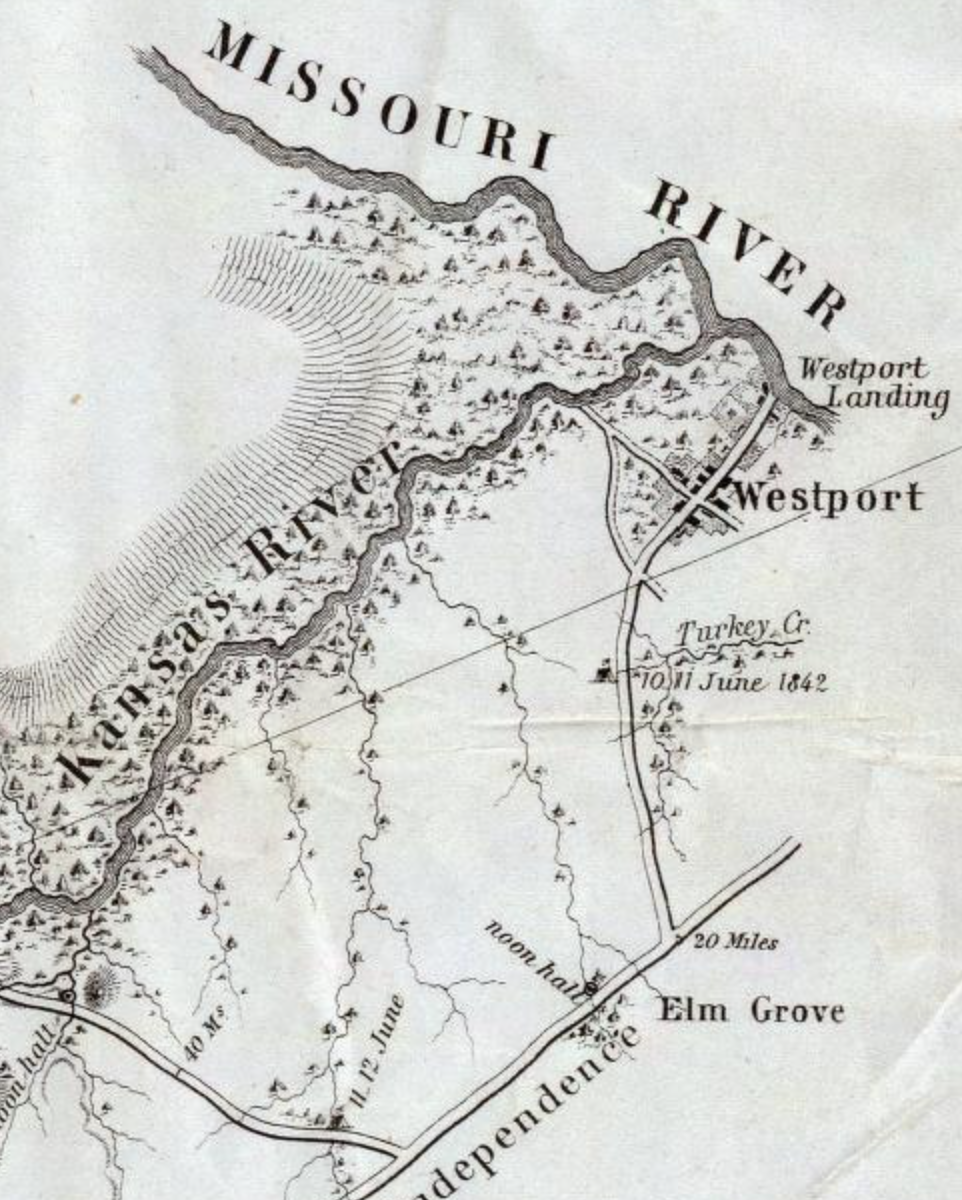
Westport at the time of Fremont's 1842 expedition

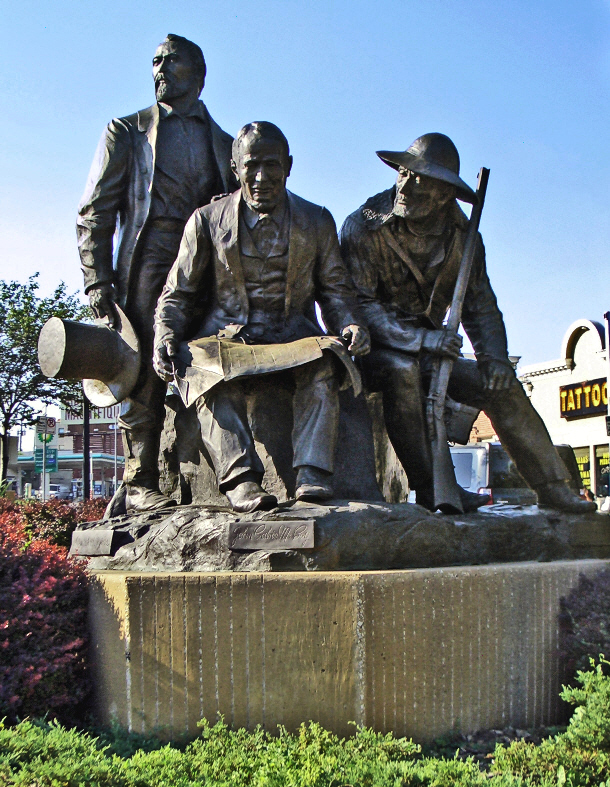
Kansas City Pioneer Square monument in Westport features Alexander Majors, John Calvin McCoy, and Jim Bridger.

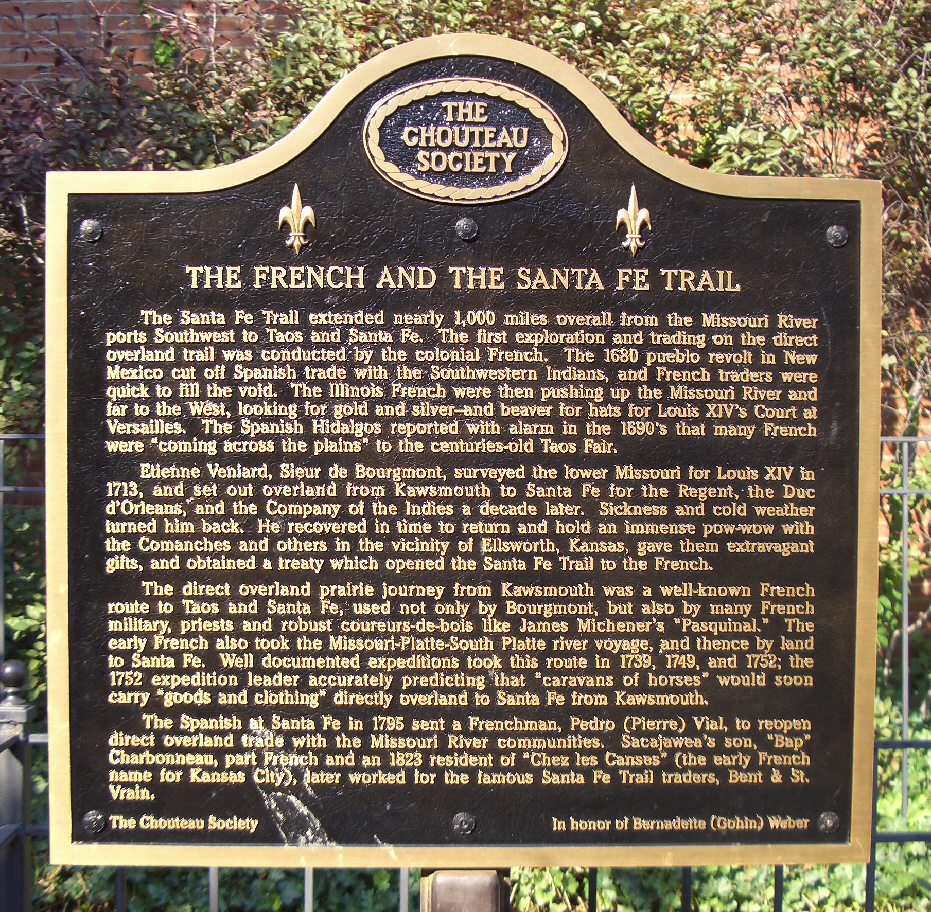
French heritage marker about the Santa Fe Trail placed by The Chouteau Society

located approximately three miles due south of what became downtown Kansas City, Missouri (KCMO), Westport was first settled by Tennessee native Daniel Yoacham and his family c. 1823. He was followed by Isaac McCoy, who built a large log house on a hill at what became 43rd and Wornall. His son John built a two-story residence and trading post at what became the northeast corner of Westport Road and Pennsylvania Ave. In 1851, the Ewing Brothers built a store at what became the northwest corner, and which became Kelly's Westport Inn, which is the oldest surviving building in KCMO. Albert G. Boone, the grandson of American pioneer Daniel Boone, bought the Ewings' store to provision the booming 1850s westward expansion trails into Kansas Territory, and as an organizing place for Boone's pro-slavery forces.

John McCoy was a degreed surveyor by trade, and platted West Port, buying the parcel from his brother-in-law and fellow missionary Johnston Lykins, and then formally incorporated in February 1857. He is generally considered the "father of Kansas City". He ordered supplies to be landed at a rocky point on the Missouri River between Grand and Main streets, which became known as Westport's Landing. When the landing became popular enough to attract business from the next landing at Independence, fourteen pioneering investors including John McCoy formed the Town of Kansas company to buy the land, including Westport's Landing, parcels from Johnston Lykins, and parcels from Gabriel Prud'homme. Westport's trade with native tribes extended to the Great Plains and Rocky Mountains.

By 1850, the combined settlements of West Port and Kansas surpassed Independence's role as an outfitting and starting point for traders, trappers, and emigrants heading west on the Santa Fe and Oregon trails. West Port's greatest prosperity came between 1854 and 1860. The Civil War brought many skirmishes between pro- and anti-slavery groups in the area, and the Battle of Westport was in October 1864. After the war, trade fell off sharply and never recovered, and by 1899, Kansas City annexed Westport.

The cholera pandemic of 1849 had killed half of the populations of each of the two area boomtowns of West Port and Kansas, totaling thousands. This filled each of their sole cemeteries, prompting the search for one new cemetery site halfway between, to unify both communities for all time. On November 9, 1857, while the newly incorporated City of Kansas (renamed from the town of Kansas) had a population of about 4,000, Union Cemetery was opened. It is the oldest surviving cemetery in what became KCMO.

The historic Nutterville area, east of Broadway Street, was developed by James B. Nutter Sr. who ensured that its old homes were restored by being adapted as business offices. The houses are colorfully painted and landscaped.

== See also ==
- California Trail, Oregon Trail
- National Register of Historic Places listings in Jackson County, Missouri
- List of neighborhoods in Kansas City, Missouri
- St. Paul's Episcopal Day School
- Westport High School
- Harris-Kearney House
