= William Miles Chick =

American businessman and pioneer (1794–1847)

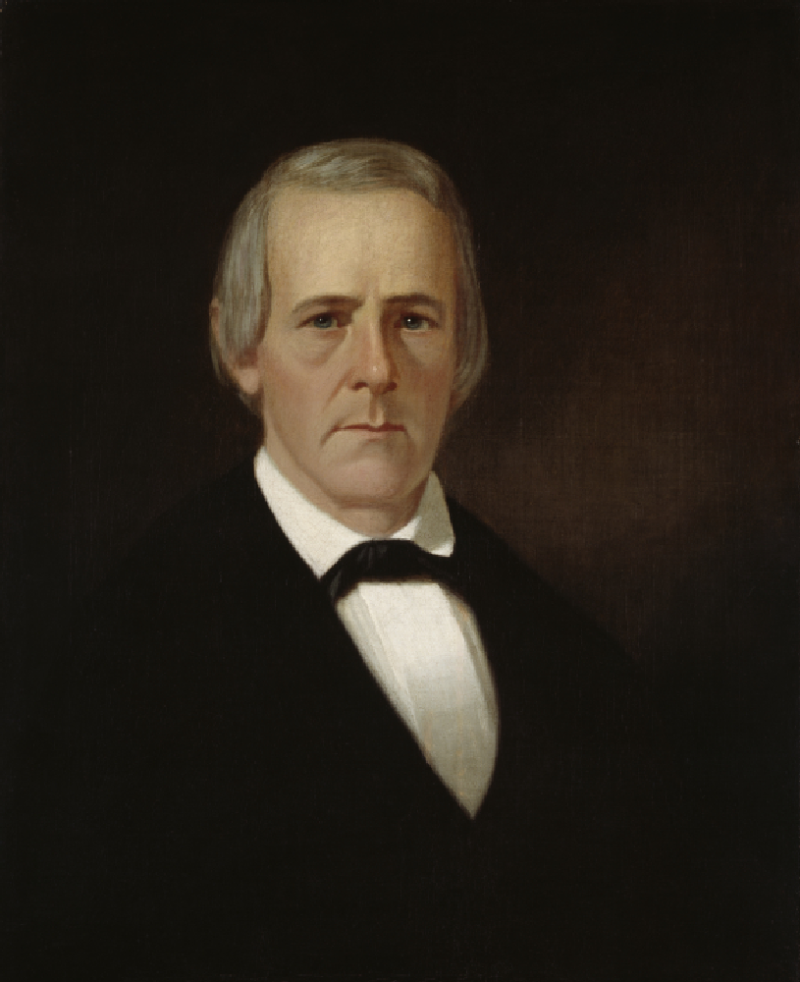
- 1870 posthumous portrait of Chick by George Caleb Bingham

1st postmaster of Kansas City, Missouri
- In office 1845 – April 7, 1847
- Preceding: Position established
- Preceded by: Washington Henry Chick

Personal details
- Born: August 31, 1794 Lynchburg, Virginia, US
- Died: April 7, 1847 (aged 52) Kansas City, Missouri, US
- Relations: Nathan Scarritt (son-in-law); John Calvin McCoy (son-in-law); William Chick Scarritt (grandson); Dorothy McKibbin (great-granddaughter); Isaac McCoy (co-father-in-law)
- Children: 8
- Occupation: Businessman, pioneer

Military service
- Rank: Colonel
- War: War of 1812

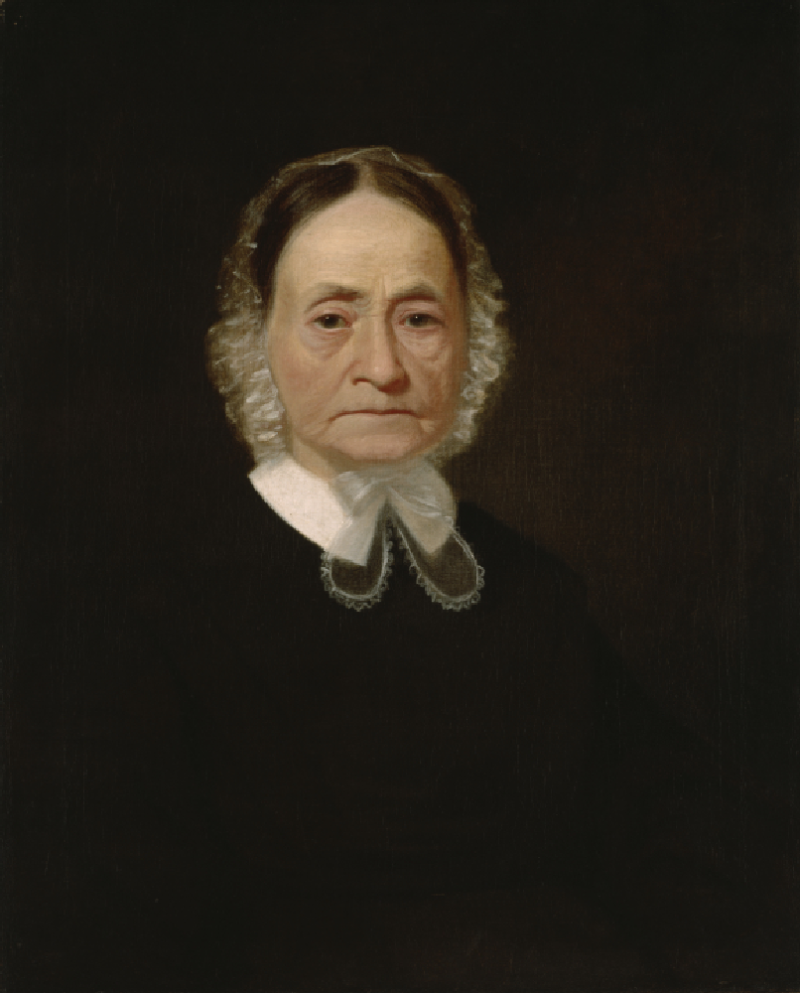
1870 posthumous portrait of Ann Eliza Smith Chick, Chick's wife, by George Caleb Bingham

William Miles Chick (August 31, 1794 – April 7, 1847) is an American businessman and pioneer, who was one of the earliest settlers and the first postmaster of Kansas City, Missouri.

== Early life ==
Chick was born on a tobacco farm near Lynchburg, Virginia, on August 31, 1794. He grew up working on the farm, and worked as a merchant in Alexandria. He served in the War of 1812, reaching the rank of colonel, but never fought a battle. In 1816, he married Ann Eliza Smith, having 8 children.

== Kansas City ==
In 1822, Chick moved to Missouri and built a farm. When the Missouri River flooded in 1826, their farm was destroyed. He then moved to Howard County and spent a decade farming tobacco. In 1836, he moved to Kansas City and bought a 2-story log cabin from John Calvin McCoy. There, he operated a general store.

In 1838, he and a group of investors founded the Town of Kansas. In 1843, he opened a riverfront warehouse to store fur.

== Death and legacy ==
In 1845, Chick became the first postmaster of Kansas City, serving until his death of pneumonia on April 7, 1847. After his death, his son Washington Henry Chick became the second postmaster of Kansas City.

One of Chick's daughter's, Virginia Christiana Chick, married John Calvin McCoy on January 23, 1838. Another daughter, Martha Matilda Chick, married Nathan Scarritt in 1850. Their child and his grandson, William Chick Scarritt—who was named after him, was a prominent lawyer and owner of the William Chick Scarritt House. Chick's great-granddaughter was Dorothy McKibbin, a manager of the Manhattan Project.
