= Nathan Scarritt =

American educator, pastor, and real estate dealer (1821–1890)

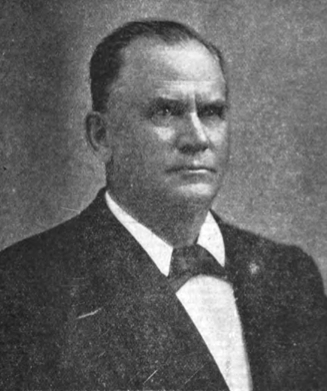
- Born: April 14, 1821; Edwardsville, Illinois, US
- Died: May 22, 1890 (aged 69)
- Education: McKendree College (1842)
- Occupations: Educator, pastor, real estate dealer
- Children: William Chick Scarritt
- Relatives: William Miles Chick (father-in-law); Dorothy McKibbin (granddaughter); John Calvin McCoy (brother-in-law); Isaac McCoy

Nathan Scarritt (April 14, 1821 — May 22, 1890) was an American educator, pastor and real estate dealer.

== Early life and education ==
Scarritt was born on April 14, 1821, in Edwardsville, Illinois, the seventh of twelve children. His parents, Nathan and Latty, traveled from New Hampshire on wagon. As a child, he worked on a farm in Alton, Illinois, and didn't receive a proper education.

At age 16, Scarritt began attending McKendree College, having to work as a cleaner for the school to pay for tuition. During his third year of college, his father became ill and he left school to care for him. The school paid for his final year, and he graduated in 1842 as valedictorian.

== Education career ==
To pay off student debts, Scarritt worked briefly as a schoolteacher in Waterloo, Illinois until 1845, when he moved to Fayette, Missouri. There, he worked as a teacher and helped establish Howard Female College. For his efforts, the University of Missouri awarded him an honorary Master of Arts.

== Religious career ==
Scarritt converted to the Methodist Episcopal Church, South denomination of Christianity in 1848, and began working at the Shawnee Methodist Mission. In 1850, he married Martha Matilda Chick, daughter of William Miles Chick. That same year, he moved out of his home and onto a farm.

He left the Methodist Mission in 1852, and was later appointed by a bishop as an elder of the Kickapoo people. He also worked as a traveling minister for the Delaware, Shawnee and Wyandot tribes—with translations done by Silas Armstrong.

== Death and legacy ==
Scarritt died on May 22, 1890. His son William Chick Scarritt was a lawyer and owner of the William Chick Scarritt House. Scarritt's granddaughter was Dorothy McKibbin, a manager of the Manhattan Project.

Scarritt donated US$5,000 (equivalent to about $152,000 in 2024) to the Neosho Collegiate Institute sometime between the 1870s and 1890s. It changed its name to Scarritt College in his honor.
