= James B. Nutter Sr. =

American philanthropist

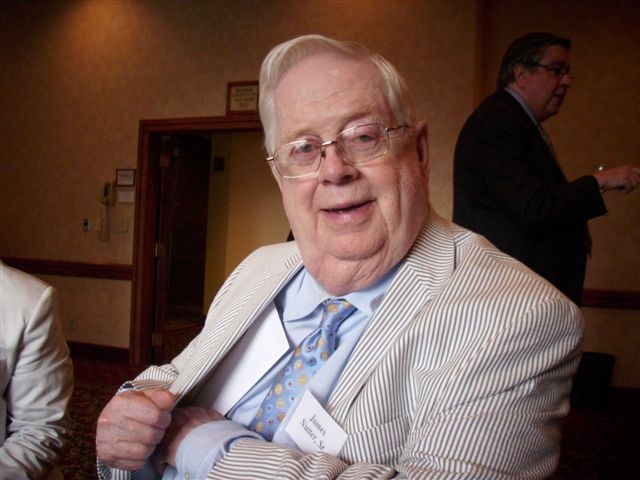
James B. Nutter Sr.

James B. Nutter, Sr. (January 23, 1928 – July 7, 2017) was the founder and chairman of James B. Nutter & Company, a privately owned mortgage banking firm headquartered in Kansas City, Missouri. It is one of the oldest and largest family-owned and operated mortgage lending firms in the United States, servicing billions in mortgages and making home loans in all 50 states, the District of Columbia and Puerto Rico.

The Kansas City Board of Parks and Recreation named a section of street adjacent to many of the James B. Nutter and Company corporate offices and old homes revitalized into business offices, James B. Nutter Way in October 2013. Nutter was recognized as a Kansas City philanthropist by the University of Missouri - Kansas City School of Medicine in May 2014 with an honorary doctorate for a promoting health in Kansas City, advocating for safe and affordable housing, and community revitalization and philanthropic efforts. Nutter is credited for refusing to adhere to the discriminatory lending practices of the day and the company was one of the first to make home loans in black neighborhoods and to single women on a large scale.

Nutter was named 2012 Kansas Citian of the Year by the Greater Kansas City Chamber of Commerce.

== Early life ==
Nutter and his family lost their home in 1940, amid the Great Depression, and moved into a rental house. At age 12 Nutter was delivering fliers for local politicians. At 13 he was working 30 hours a week at a library – re-shelving books and cleaning up – for $30 a month. He opened a savings account with $50 after his second paycheck. Nutter earned a business degree from the University of Missouri in 1949, after serving 1 1/2 years in the U.S. Army at Camp Stoneman near San Francisco.

== Business career ==
Nutter founded James B. Nutter & Co. in 1951, working out of his home. He was one of the first real estate professionals in Kansas City to get into government-backed Veterans Administration home loans, which became a mainstay of his company. In the 1950s and '60s, his company was one of the first to make home loans in black neighborhoods and to single women on a large scale. In 1964, with foreclosure rates on the rise, his company created a forbearance program to help borrowers who were behind on their house payments. In 1995, he was appointed by President Bill Clinton to the board of directors of the Federal Home Loan Mortgage Corp.

During the subprime mortgage crisis in 2006 and 2007, the financial media recognized him, his son, Jim Jr., and their company, as examples of fiscal responsibility for refusing to get into subprime loans. The company was a pioneer in reverse mortgages, having initiated the nation's first Federal Housing Administration-insured reverse mortgages in 1989.

== Philanthropy, preservation and politics ==
Some of Nutter non-profit donations include Habitat for Humanity; Mayo Clinic; Kansas City's Children's Mercy Hospital; the Central Library (Kansas City, Missouri), Harry S. Truman Library Institute; Kansas City Central Library; Boy Scouts of America (as a boy he earned the rank of Eagle Scout); Saint Luke's Hospital of Kansas City; Little Sisters of the Poor; and Wayside Waifs animal rescue.

Named for him are the James B. Nutter Sr. Family Information Commons at Ellis Library on the main campus of his alma mater, the University of Missouri; the James B. Nutter Family Classroom in the Henry W. Bloch School of Management at the University of Missouri-Kansas City, and the Nutter Ivanhoe Neighborhood Center and Park in the urban core of Kansas City.

Nutter acquired a wide swath of older homes in Kansas City's historic Westport neighborhood and turned them into a collection of eclectic, entrepreneurial office spaces known as Nutterville. The formerly drab houses are now painted in bright colors and surrounded by flower beds. The work has included the renovation of the Reverend Nathan Scarritt Home.

Nutter's renovation of the 1847 Nathan Scarritt House and his creation of Nutterville earned him a 2004 Annual Recognition Award, in the historic preservation category, from the Jackson County (Mo.) Historical Society.

In 1979, Nutter helped spearhead a successful drive to win approval for a bond issue to replace an aging jail, atop the Jackson County Courthouse in downtown Kansas City, where inmates had to be hosed down to relieve their suffering in the summer heat. Nutter's support for racial equality has extended beyond the workings of his mortgage business. For example, in 1964 Nutter canvassed his own neighborhood to help pass a city ordinance that made it illegal for shops, hotels and restaurants to refuse service to black patrons. His was one of only two predominantly white wards to vote in favor of the ordinance.

In November 2012, Nutter received the Harold L. Holliday Sr. Civil Rights Award from the NAACP’s Kansas City, Mo. Branch.

As a young man, Nutter got to know President Harry S. Truman, fostering an interest in local, state and national politics. Nutter was among Missouri's largest individual political contributors, making substantial contributions to Democratic candidates and committees, including Emanuel Cleaver II, when Cleaver was elected Kansas City's first African American mayor in 1991.

== Personal life ==
Nutter and his wife Annabel had two children: Nancy Nutter (deceased) and James B. Nutter Jr. Nutter Sr. died on July 7, 2017, in Kansas City.
