= William Chick Scarritt House =

Historic house in Kansas City, Missouri, US

- U.S. National Register of Historic Places
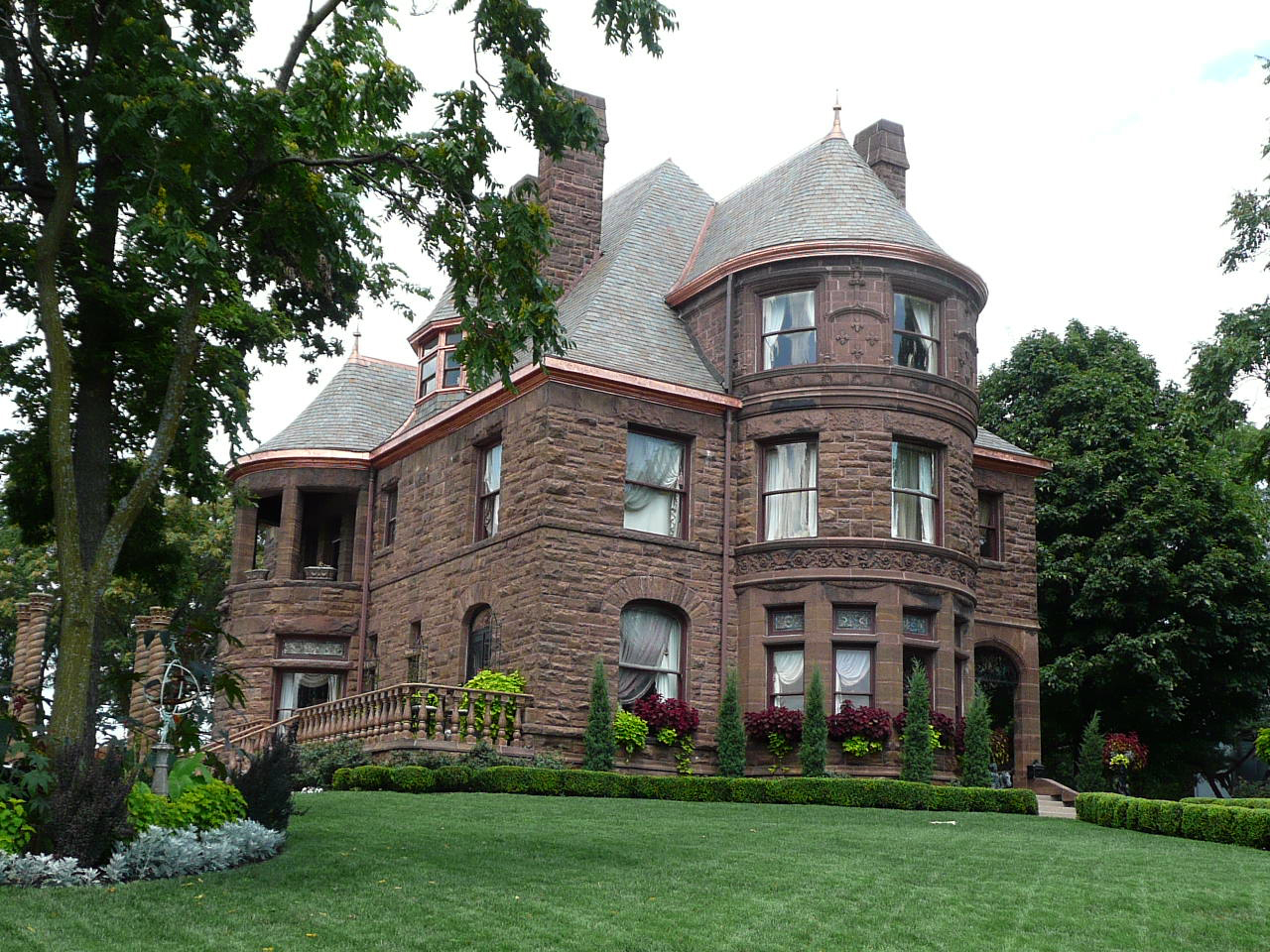
- The William Chick Scarritt House in 2015
- Location: Scarrit Renaissance, Kansas City, Missouri, US
- Built: 1888
- Architect: John Wellborn Root
- Architectural style: Châteauesque
- Restored: 2017
- NRHP reference No.: 78001661
- Added to NRHP: March 21, 1976

The William Chick Scarritt House at 3240 Norledge Avenue, is a historic house in Scarritt Renaissance, Kansas City, Missouri.

== History ==
The William Chick Scarritt House was designed in 1888 by John Wellborn Root in a Châteauesque style. It was built for lawyer William Chick Scarritt, grandson of William Miles Chick, son of Nathan Scarritt, and father of Dorothy McKibbin. William was the police commissioner of Kansas City from 1896 to 1897, and president of the Board of Park Commissioners in 1922.

It was a nursing home from the 1940s to the 2000s.

The house was added to the National Register of Historic Places on March 21, 1976. It was added to the Kansas City Register of Historic Places in 1983.

The house was renovated in 2012. In the morning of September 12, 2016, the house caught fire. In 2017, neighbors of the mansion helped rebuild it.

The house is two stories with a basement. It has a limestone foundation, brownstone walls, and a hip roof.

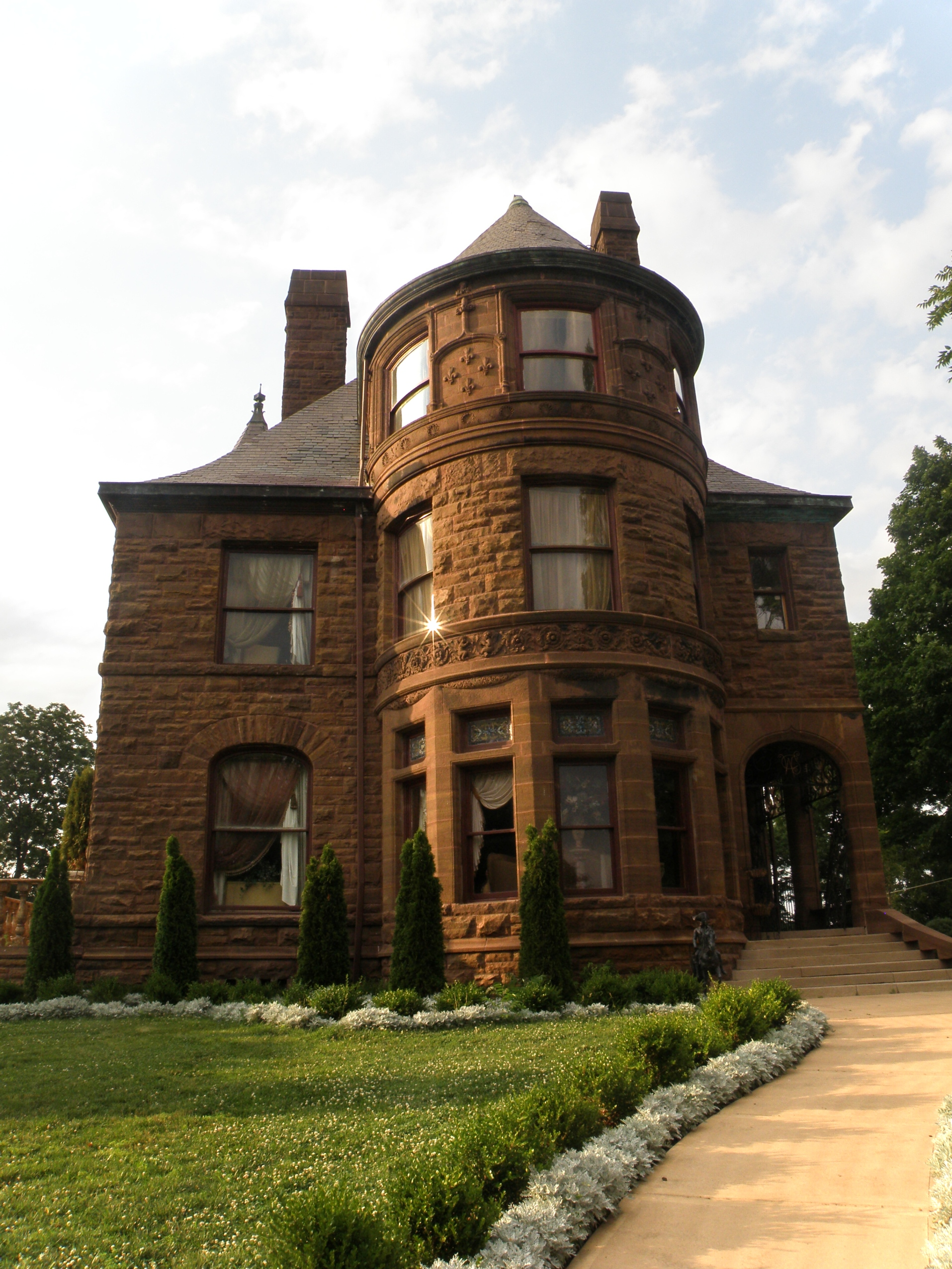
3240 Norledge Avenue

== See also ==
- Reverend Nathan Scarritt Home
- Pendleton Heights, Kansas City
