= Centropolis, Kansas =

Unincorporated community in Franklin County, Kansas

- CDP
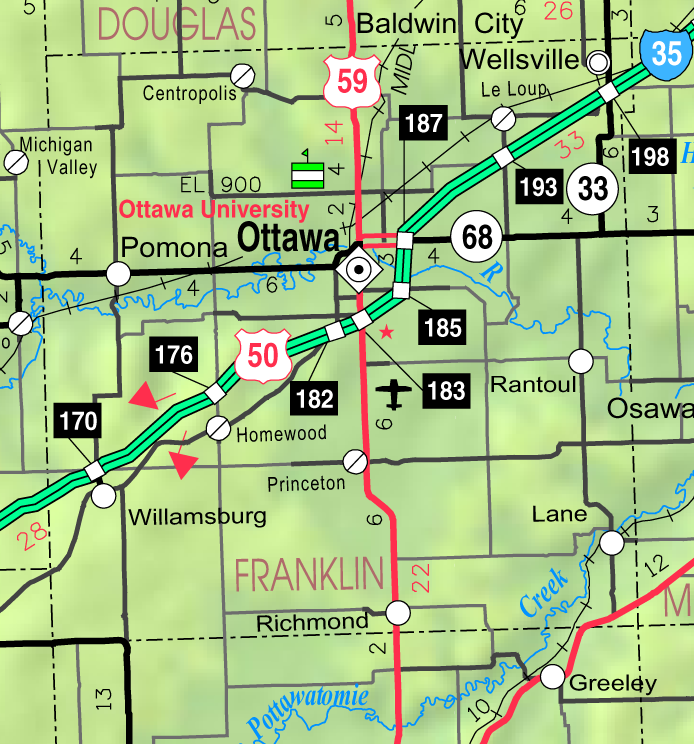
- KDOT map of Franklin County (legend)

- Location within Kansas Location within the United States
- Coordinates: 38°42′58″N 95°21′01″W
- Country: United States
- State: Kansas
- County: Franklin
- Elevation: 961 ft (293 m)

Population (2020)
  - Total: 100
- Time zone: UTC-6 (CST)
  - Summer (DST): UTC-5 (CDT)
- Area code: 785
- FIPS code: 20-12450
- GNIS ID: 479371

Centropolis is a census-designated place (CDP) in Franklin County, Kansas, United States. As of the 2020 census, the population was 100. It is located about 11 miles northwest of Ottawa. In the 1850s, Centropolis had the distinction of briefly vying for territorial capital of Kansas.

== History ==
The area was first settled by Perry Fuller in 1855, who established a store in order to trade with the nearby Ottawa Indians. His store prospered and in 1856 he established the Centropolis Town Company and began selling lots. The community name is a portmanteau of central and metropolis. A missionary newspaper published by Jotham Meeker for the Ottawa Baptist Mission was the first newspaper in Franklin County. The first commercial newspaper in the county, the Kansas Leader, was founded in 1857. Not only did Fuller expect his new town to become county seat but also the territorial capital of Kansas and eventually state capital.

Two miles east of Centropolis, St. Bernard was established and the Territorial Legislature made St. Bernard the Franklin County seat but despite having the county seat, St. Bernard did not grow and post office was closed and renamed Minneola.

The Centropolis post office closed in 1930.

== Geography ==
Centropolis has an elevation of 961 feet (293 m).

== Demographics ==
Historical population
Census	Pop.	Note	%±
2020	100		—
U.S. Decennial Census

The 2020 United States census counted 100 people, 50 households, and 31 families in Centropolis. The population density was 298.5 per square mile (115.3/km^{2}). There were 51 housing units at an average density of 152.2 per square mile (58.8/km^{2}). The racial makeup was 88.0% (88) white or European American (88.0% non-Hispanic white), 0.0% (0) black or African-American, 1.0% (1) Native American or Alaska Native, 0.0% (0) Asian, 0.0% (0) Pacific Islander or Native Hawaiian, 5.0% (5) from other races, and 6.0% (6) from two or more races. Hispanic or Latino of any race was 6.0% (6) of the population.

Of the 50 households, 18.0% had children under the age of 18; 42.0% were married couples living together; 26.0% had a female householder with no spouse or partner present. 34.0% of households consisted of individuals and 12.0% had someone living alone who was 65 years of age or older. The average household size was 2.6 and the average family size was 2.3. The percent of those with a bachelor's degree or higher was estimated to be 0.0% of the population.

23.0% of the population was under the age of 18, 6.0% from 18 to 24, 18.0% from 25 to 44, 35.0% from 45 to 64, and 18.0% who were 65 years of age or older. The median age was 49.0 years. For every 100 females, there were 85.2 males. For every 100 females ages 18 and older, there were 87.8 males.
