= John Tecumseh Jones =

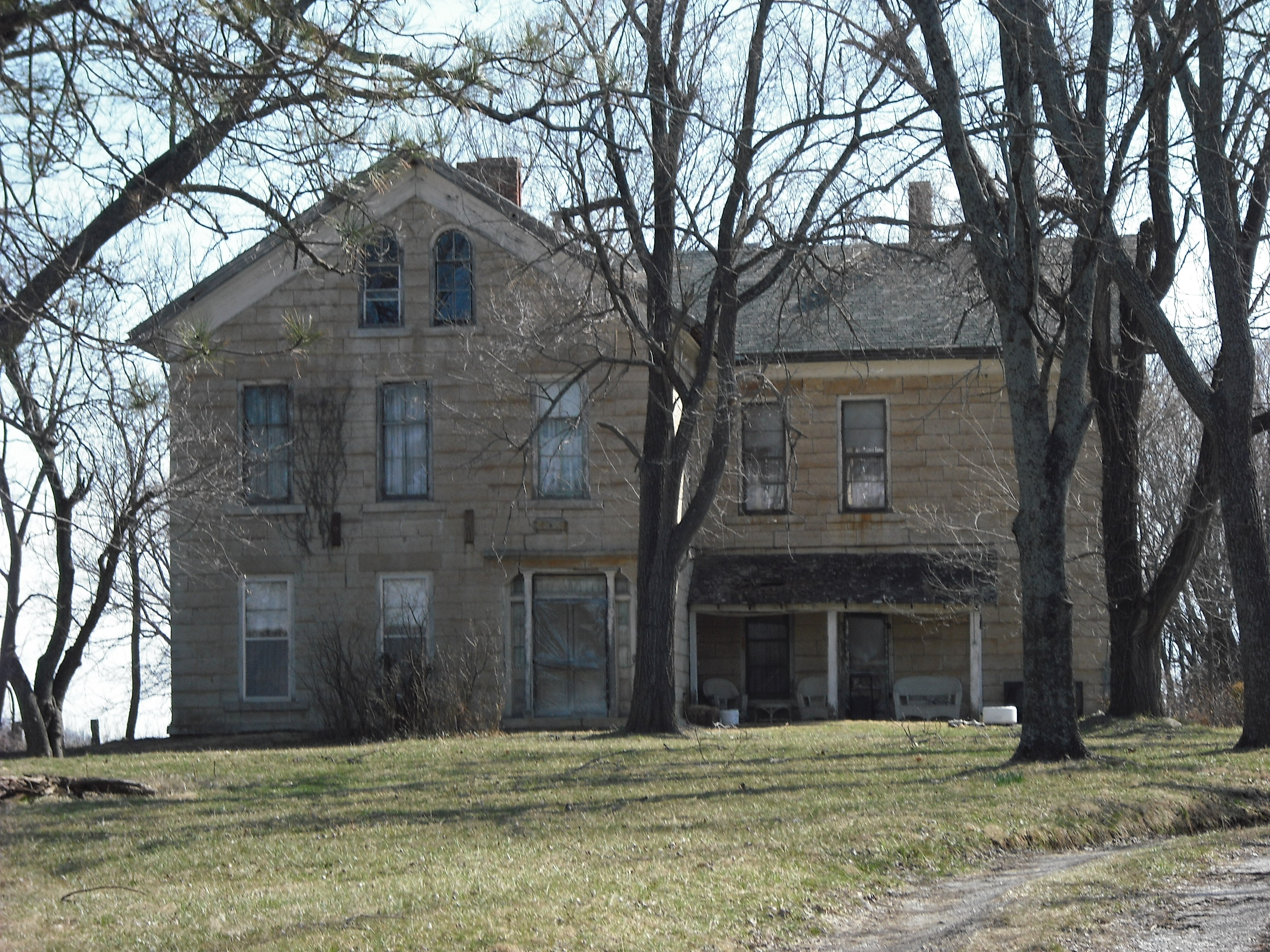
The Tauy Jones House (ca. 1863–1867) was a hotel and home in Ottawa, Kansas. The stone house was built on the site of his earlier homes and trading post, which were burned by pro-slavers

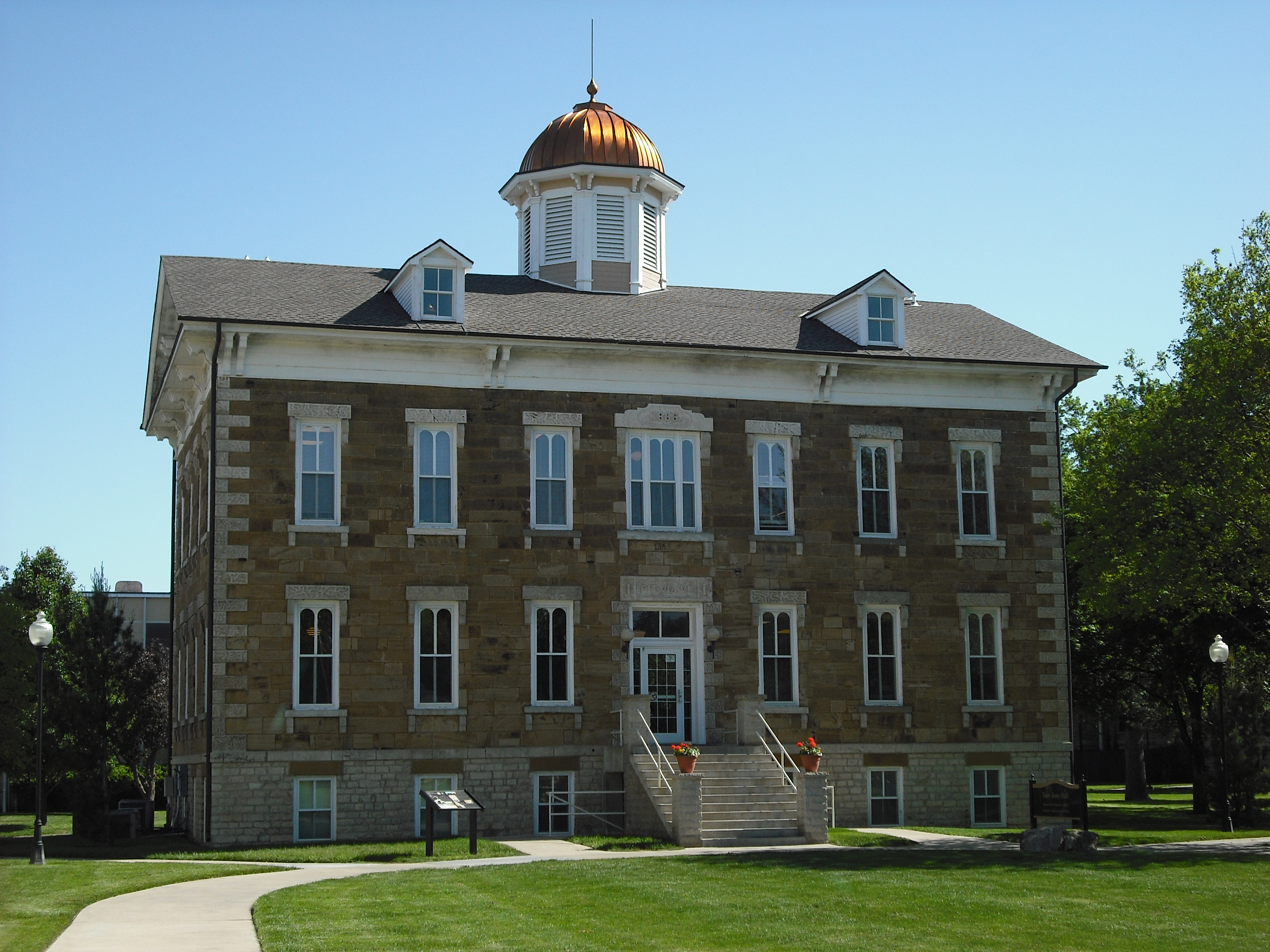
Tauy Jones Hall (ca. 1866–1869) at Ottawa University in Kansas

John Tecumseh “Tauy” Jones (1800-1873, Ojibwe) was a businessman and Baptist minister. He served as an interpreter and leader for the Potawatomi tribe in Kansas. He also served as a leader for the Odawa tribe and as their minister. He was a friend of abolitionist John Brown, and a co-founder of Ottawa University in Ottawa, Kansas.

== Early life ==
John Tecumseh Jones was born in Canada in 1800 (Note: 1800 birth date provided on his gravestone) to an Ojibwe (Chippewa) mother and a father of British ancestry. Jones spent his earliest years with a sister and her blacksmith husband on Mackinac Island in Michigan.

While living there he befriended a Captain Connor and rode on his ship to Detroit to live with Connor's family, where he learned English and French. Connor was alcoholic and threw Jones out of the family home after Mrs. Connor died.

Local Baptists took in Jones and in the 1820s recruited him and other local Indians to attend a Baptist mission school, Carey Mission (now in Indiana, then part of Michigan) for four or five years. He reacquired a knowledge of regional Indigenous languages as preparation for a mission to Native Americans. Next he enrolled at what is now Colgate University in New York; he left after about four years due to his health.

Jones taught at the Choctaw Academy boarding school in Kentucky for a year. He returned to Michigan to visit his sister. He went to Sault Ste. Marie (in present-day Michigan) to work as an interpreter.

== Move to Kansas ==
In 1838 Jones moved to Kansas to serve as an interpreter for the Pottawatomie. He next worked with Rev. Jotham Meeker, a Baptist missionary and printer.

In 1840 Jones married Rachel Littleman, from the Stockbridge–Munsee Community. After her death, he married Jane Kelly in 1845, who was a Yankee missionary from Maine.

Jones acquired a trading post in 1848 from a trader named Roby on what is now Tauy Creek. There he built a frame and log house and hotel, as the site was a main stop between Fort Leavenworth and Fort Scott. Jones was sympathetic to the abolitionist Free State cause and became a friend of John Brown.

In 1856 pro-slavery Missourians burned down Jones's house, and burned the next one as well. In 1862 he started to build a third house on the same site, a large stone structure that is now known as the Tauy Jones House. He hired Damon Higbie of LeLoup.

== Affiliation with Odawa tribe and Ottawa University ==
Starting in the 1840s, Jones was adopted into the Odawa (Ottawa) tribe. He became one of the leaders and was known as "Tauy" or "Ottaway," which was an abbreviated version of "Ottawa." While serving in 1860 as a representative of the Odawa, Jones suggested founding an integrated white and Indian school. This eventually became Ottawa University, and he was actively involved with the school until his death. He died in 1873 and was buried in the Indian cemetery northeast of Ottawa. Jones also was a co-founder of Ottawa University and the school's oldest building, Tauy Jones Hall, is named after him.
