= Shawnee Sun =

Defunct Shawnee-language newspaper

- Founder: Jotham Meeker
- Publisher: Jotham Meeker, John G. Pratt
- Editor: Johnston Lykins
- Founded: 1835; 191 years ago
- Ceased publication: 1844
- Language: Shawnee
- Headquarters: Shawnee Baptist Mission
- Country: Indian Territory
- Circulation: 200

The Shawnee Sun (Shawnee: Siwinowe Kesibwi) newspaper was published in the Shawnee language from 1835 to 1844, in the portion of Indian Territory that became Kansas. The paper was founded by Baptist missionary Jotham Meeker, who created his own script for Shawnee, an Algonquian language. This missionary newspaper was intended to give the Shawnee a written language, aid in education and news, and to help convert the tribe to Christianity. It is the first newspaper published entirely in a Native American language, and the first newspaper printed in what became Kansas.

== Background ==
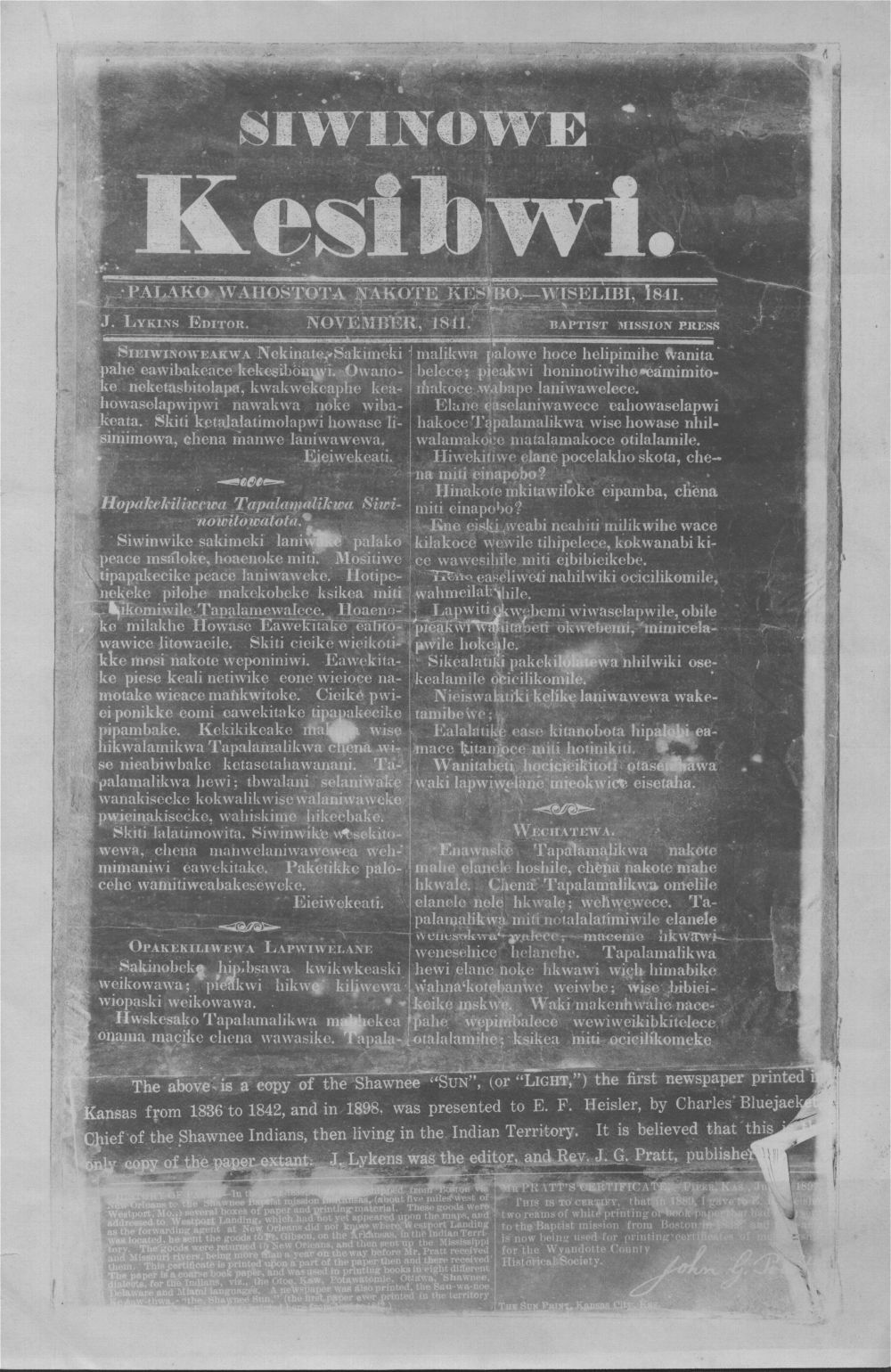
1 of 2 surviving pages

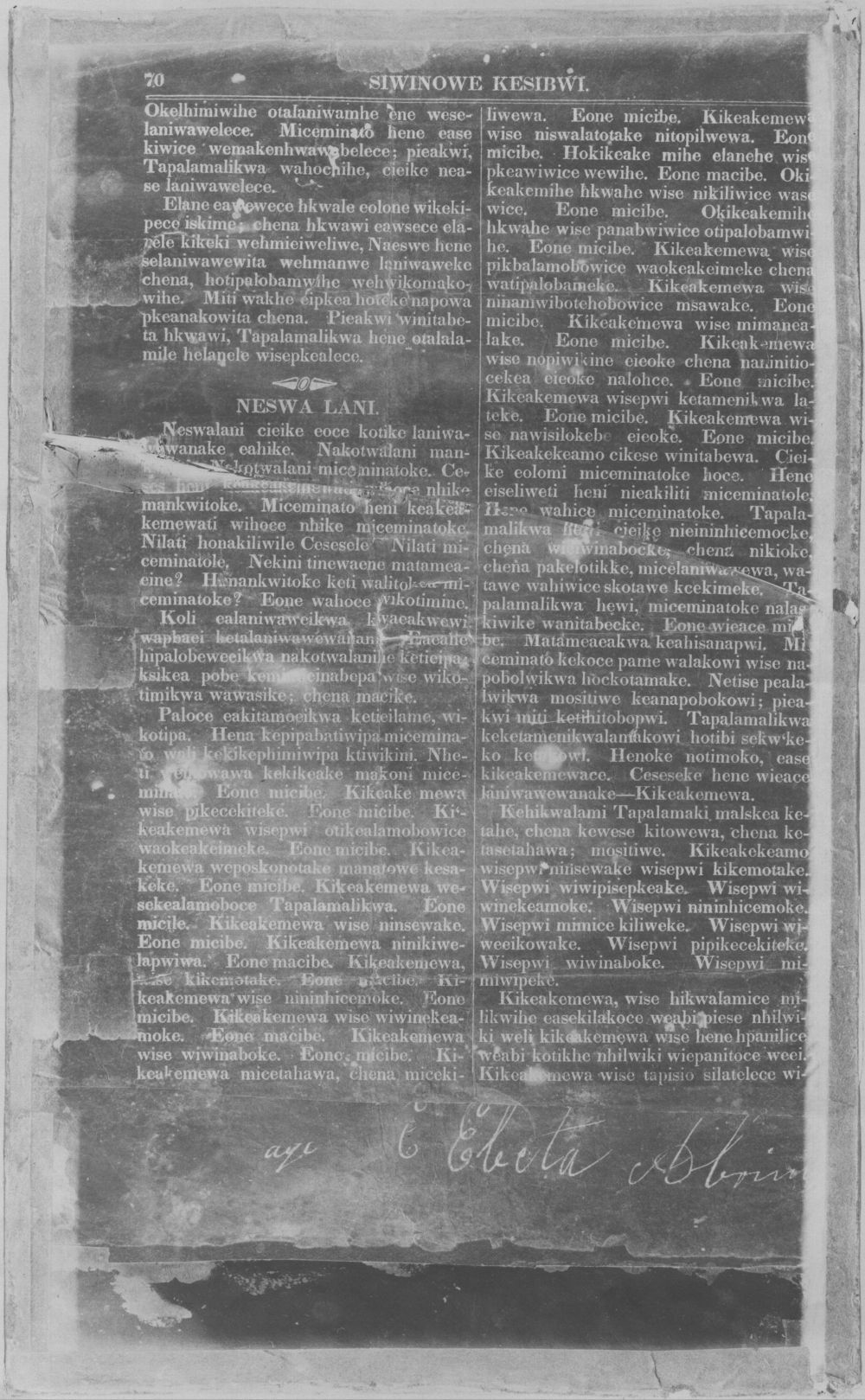
2 of 2

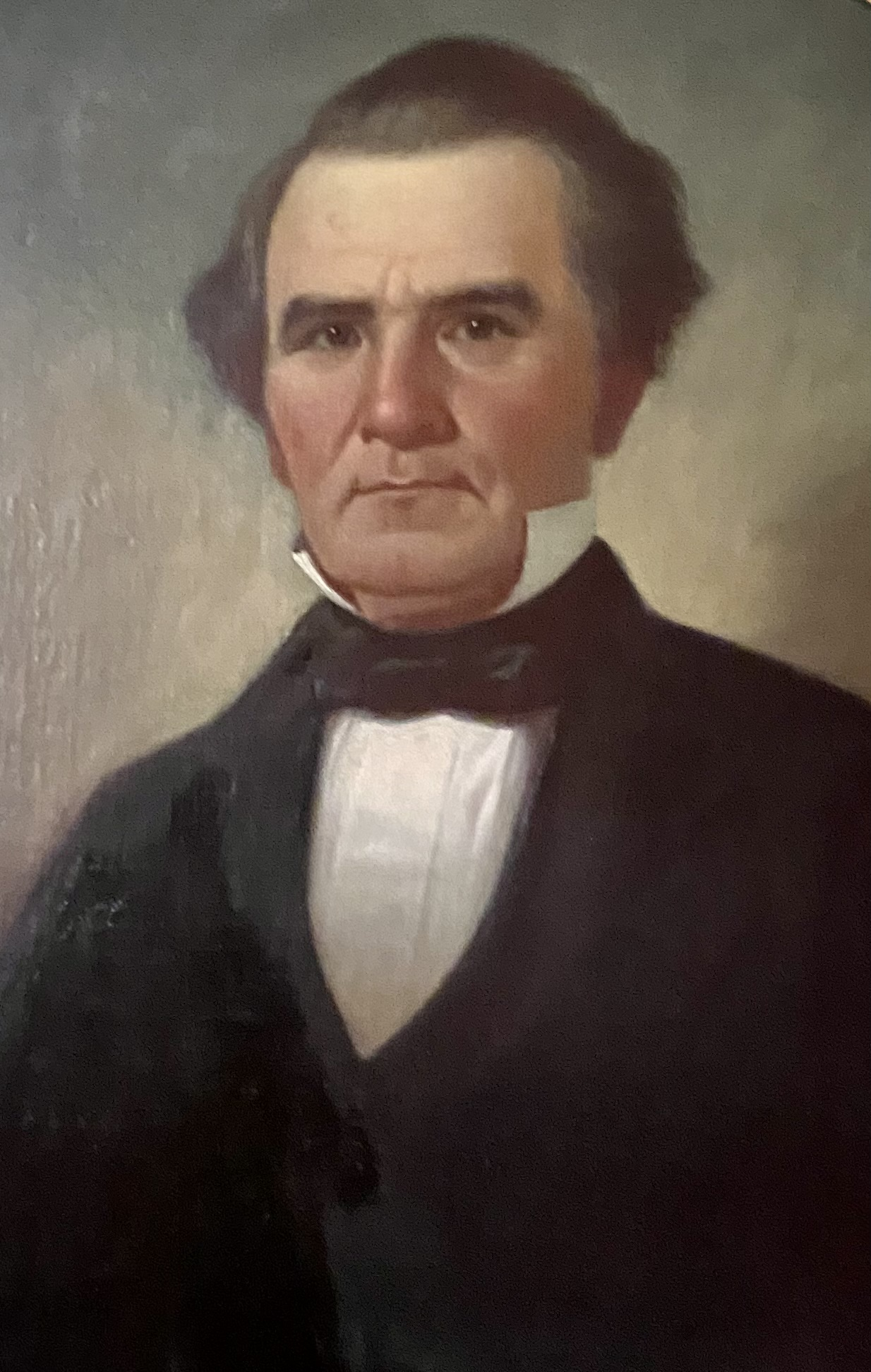
Reverend Johnston Lykins was the editor, and an author, of Shawnee Sun.

Jotham Meeker was a Baptist missionary from Cincinnati, Ohio, where he had been trained as a printer. Having served at multiple western frontier missions including Carey Mission, he bought a printing press in Cincinnati for US$550 (equivalent to about $18,000 in 2025). Fluent in the closely related languages of the Pottawatomi, Ottawa, and Chippewa tribes, he devised an orthographic script using English alphabet characters to phonetically sound like tribal languages and quickly teach them to tribal children. In 1833, he moved to the eastern part of Indian Territory which since became Kansas. The Shawnee had been recently removed to Indian Territory by the Indian Removal Act of 1830, and the mission attempted to convert the tribe to Christianity. He transcribed the Algonquian languages (specifically the Shawnee language), using the English alphabet to represent Shawnee phonemes, unlike the Cherokee syllabary of Sequoyah. Though their motivations are not clear, many Shawnee aided Meeker in his transcription work.

== Publication ==
The Shawnee Sun (in Shawnee Siwinowe Kesibwi, or Sauwa-noe Ke-sawthwa by historian Doug C. McMurtrie in 1933) was first published by Jotham Meeker in 1835, written entirely in Shawnee. One historian gives the language as Sioux. Its dimensions are 6.75 inches (17.1 cm) wide by 10.75 inches (27.3 cm) tall. It is the first newspaper written entirely in a Native American language, and the first published in what became the state of Kansas. An unrelated previous publication, the Cherokee Phoenix, had been written in both English and Cherokee. Meeker relied on the writings of both the Shawnee and white settlers in the publication. It is a missionary text, and about 80% of Shawnee were not Christian.

In its first issue, its editor Reverend Johnston Lykins wrote in the style of the Genesis creation narratives about the importance of Christianity and conversion. One of its surviving issues has a Solomon-like narrative about living in accordance with God's wishes. The writers related their God to the Great Spirit of Shawnee culture, and they used the Shawnee word Tapalamalikwa for God and miceminatoke (bad snake place) for Hell. Jotham Meeker continued publication until leaving the Shawnee mission and his printing press in May 1837, when the job was assumed by Reverend John G. Pratt who did not keep a meticulous publication diary like Meeker.

Publication was first monthly and then sporadically, and it dissolved in 1844. A note attached to one of the surviving issues says publication dissolved in 1842, though the Baptist Missionary Magazine mentions its publication until 1844. According to his review of the Shawnee Sun's history in 1933, McMurtrie concluded that it had a limited readership, with perhaps only "two hundred copies to an issue". A second Baptist publication for Native Americans, the Cherokee Messenger, was launched in 1844.

Only two pages of the paper are in historical collections, and both have been translated by George Blanchard, an elder in the Absentee Shawnee Tribe of Oklahoma. One of its issues is located at the University of Missouri–Kansas City's archives. (Note: Beatty gives its location as being in the Jotham Meeker collection at the Kansas State Historical Society, but this is incorrect.) Following Blanchard's 2008 translation of the extant issues, the Shawnee have been better able to understand the paper.
