= KTJO-FM =

Radio station in Ottawa, Kansas (1974–2016)

Ottawa, Kansas; United States
- Frequency: 88.9 MHz

Programming
- Format: Defunct (formerly modern rock)

Ownership
- Owner: Ottawa University

History
- First air date: 1974
- Last air date: January 8, 2016

Technical information
- Licensing authority: FCC
- Facility ID: 50757
- Class: A
- ERP: 145 watts
- HAAT: 20.0 meters (65.6 ft)
- Transmitter coordinates: 38°36′16.00″N 95°15′49.00″W

Links
- Public license information: Public file; LMS
- Website: KTJO

KTJO-FM (88.9 FM) was a radio station broadcasting a modern rock music format. Licensed to Ottawa, Kansas, United States, the station was owned by Ottawa University.

The University surrendered the station's license to the Federal Communications Commission (FCC) on January 7, 2016; the FCC cancelled the license and deleted the call sign from the database on January 8.
