= Sandra de Helen =

American playwright poet novelist (born 1944)

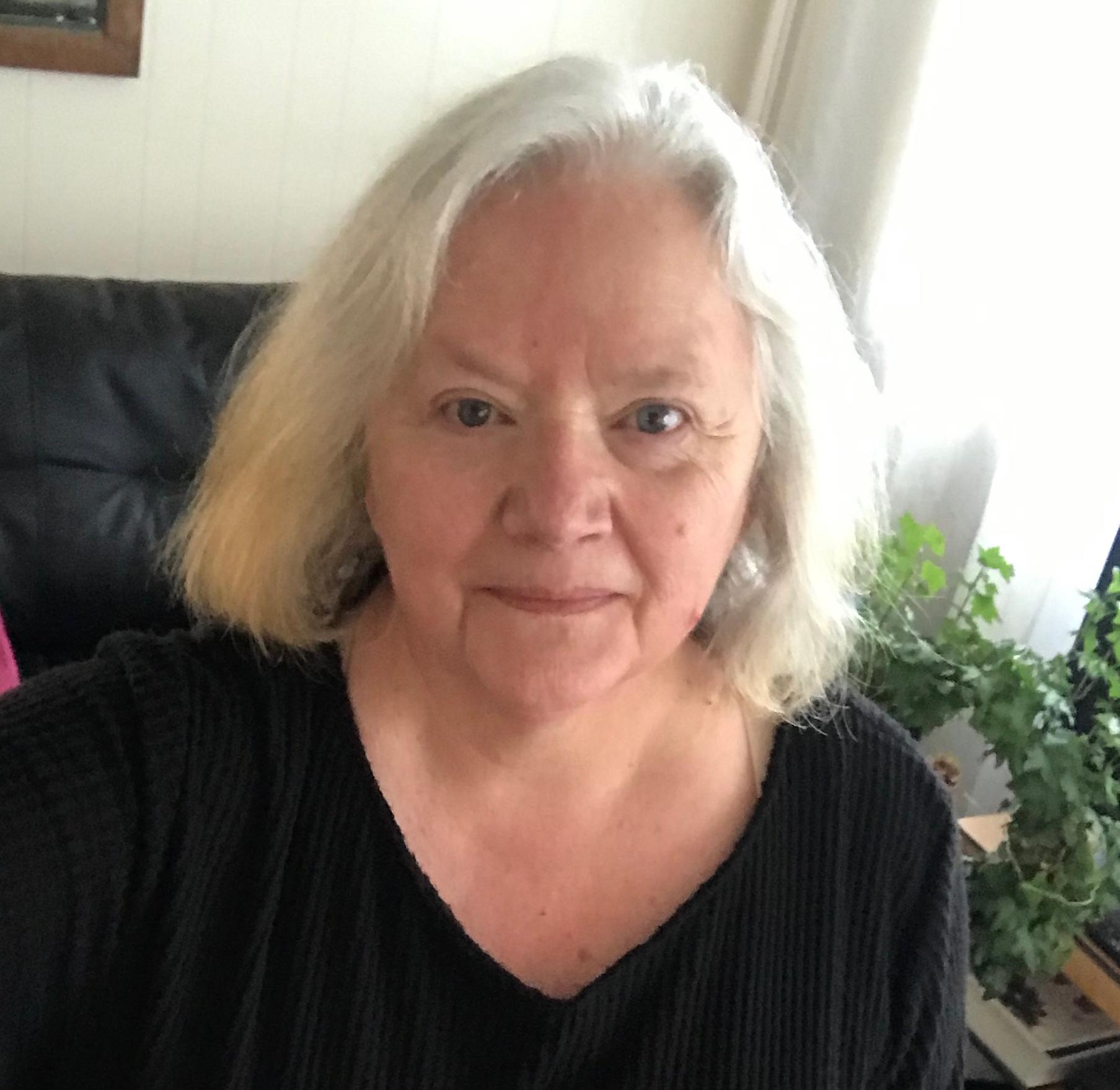
- Born: January 19, 1944 (age 82); Jefferson City, Missouri
- Occupations: Playwright, poet, novelist, editor
- Writing career
- Genres: Fiction, plays, poetry, mystery
- Subjects: Lesbian, social justice, crime and punishment, spirituality
- Website: sandradehelen.com

Sandra de Helen (born January 19, 1944) is a poet, playwright, editor, and author of mysteries, plays, short stories, essays, poetry, and articles, many of which feature lesbian protagonists.

== Early life ==
Born Sandra Lee McCorkle in 1944 to Helen Taylor McCorkle and Albert Charles McCorkle, de Helen is the older of two daughters. She spent her early years with her family in Rolla and Newburg, Missouri, then lived in St. Louis, Missouri, during her teen years. She has also lived in Amarillo, Texas, Anchorage, Alaska, Wichita, Kansas, Havasupai, Arizona, Kansas City, Missouri, San Diego, California, and now resides in Portland, Oregon.

In an interview with Bethel Swift entitled "Poets of Influence," de Helen spoke of her activism/"artivism" and social justice influences: "My mom was president of her union local, and I learned about social justice from an early age. I organized the first animal rights protest in Anchorage, Alaska in 1970, joined the women's movement the minute I heard of it, was part of the Ad Hoc Young Democrats in Alaska, and I protested the Vietnam War. I’ve been active in working for women's rights, gay rights, children's rights. I’ve protested ICE, and wrote a weekly column called “Fight This Hate” for a year after the last presidential election. Most of my activism happens on the page, whether it's a play, a poem, or an essay. My novels reflect my values and my LGBTQ community."

Sandra de Helen graduated from the Missouri University of Science and Technology-Rolla with a major in Economics. Her graduate study (including the completion of her thesis) occurred at Marylhurst University in Portland, Oregon. After raising two children and divorcing early on, she then focused on the arts, initially writing plays and later moving into poetry, essays, novels, short stories, mentoring, and editing the work of others.

== Writing career ==
With playwright Kate Kasten, de Helen co-founded Actors' Sorority, a women's theatre company in Kansas City, Missouri. She also founded the Portland Women's Theatre Company and Pen Play, a multi-cultural theatre company in Portland, Oregon. In 2009, de Helen was featured in the very first Fertile Ground Festival, which showcased new plays by the likes of William S. Gregory, Sandra De Helen, Eleanor O’Brien, Steve Patterson, Matt Zrebski, and others.

Between 1976 and 2022, Sandra penned 28 full-length plays, seven one-acts, one opera, and 36 ten-minute plays. She's also written a multitude of essays, short stories, articles, two mystery novels, and a thriller.

Early in the new millennium, de Helen turned her focus to novel writing and developed the Shirley Combs/Dr. Mary Watson mystery series of which there are currently two books. She is working on the third book in the mystery series. She has also written one thriller, "Till Darkness Comes," about which Chelsea Cain's blurb said: "I wish I had half the plotting talent that Sandra de Helen has. This is such a terrific and totally satisfying book." Reviews for Sandra's plays, poetry, and novels are generally favorable. In 2012, de Helen was featured on the show Back Page-Episode 266 and interviewed at Oregon State University by talented host and author, Jody Seay. Speaking about novel writing and where her ideas come from, de Helen focuses on the evolution of her Shirley Combs and Mary Watson mystery series and how she created her characters.

Over the years, de Helen has written over two thousand poems, including many that have gone into chapbooks, anthologies, collections, and many are available online such as at Mom Egg Review: Literature & Art, Artemis Journal, Generations of Poetry, The Dandelion Review, The Medical Journal of Australia, and Lavender Review.

She currently serves on the board of MediaRites, works closely with the board for Scripteasers, and is a member of the Golden Crown Literary Society, Poets & Writers, and The Portland Lesbian Writers Group.

== Archived and collected plays ==
16 of Sandra's plays are archived as part of the Ohio State University's International Centre for Women Playwrights Collection. A growing number of her plays are archived at The New Play Exchange® (NPX), which is the world's largest digital library of scripts by living writers who are working in an alliance of professional theaters that collaborate in innovative ways to develop, produce, and extend the life of new plays. The Werner Josten Performing Arts Library of Smith College in Northampton, MA, also archives many of de Helen's plays. The first two plays she ever wrote, "Transcendental Trepidation" and "Death After Death," have been archived at The Lesbian Herstory Archives.

== Published works ==
=== Novels ===
- The Hounding: Book One in The Shirley Combs/Dr. Mary Watson mystery series, (2012)
- The Illustrious Client: Book Two in The Shirley Combs/Dr. Mary Watson mystery series, (2013)
- Till Darkness Comes (a stand-alone thriller), (2016)

=== Poetry collections ===
- All This Remains to be Discovered (2015)
- Desire Returns for a Visit: Book One in the Poetry for the New Millennium Series (2018)
- Lesbian Humor is Not an Oxymoron: Book Two in the Poetry for the New Millennium Series (2019)
- Poetry for the People: Book Three in the Poetry for the New Millennium Series (2020)
- The World's a Stage: Book Four in the Poetry for the New Millennium Series (2021)
- I Eat My Words: Book Five in the Poetry for the New Millennium Series (2022)
- Migraines and Their Remedies: Book Six in the Poetry for the New Millennium Series (2023)

=== Contributions to story anthologies ===
- "Wanda" in Sapphic Touch(1981)
- "Common as a Loaf of Bread" in Journeys Across the Rainbow (2000)
- "Motel Noir" in Lesbians on the Loose: Crime Writers on the Lam (2018)
