= Johnston Lykins =

2nd mayor of Kansas City, Missouri (1854–1855)

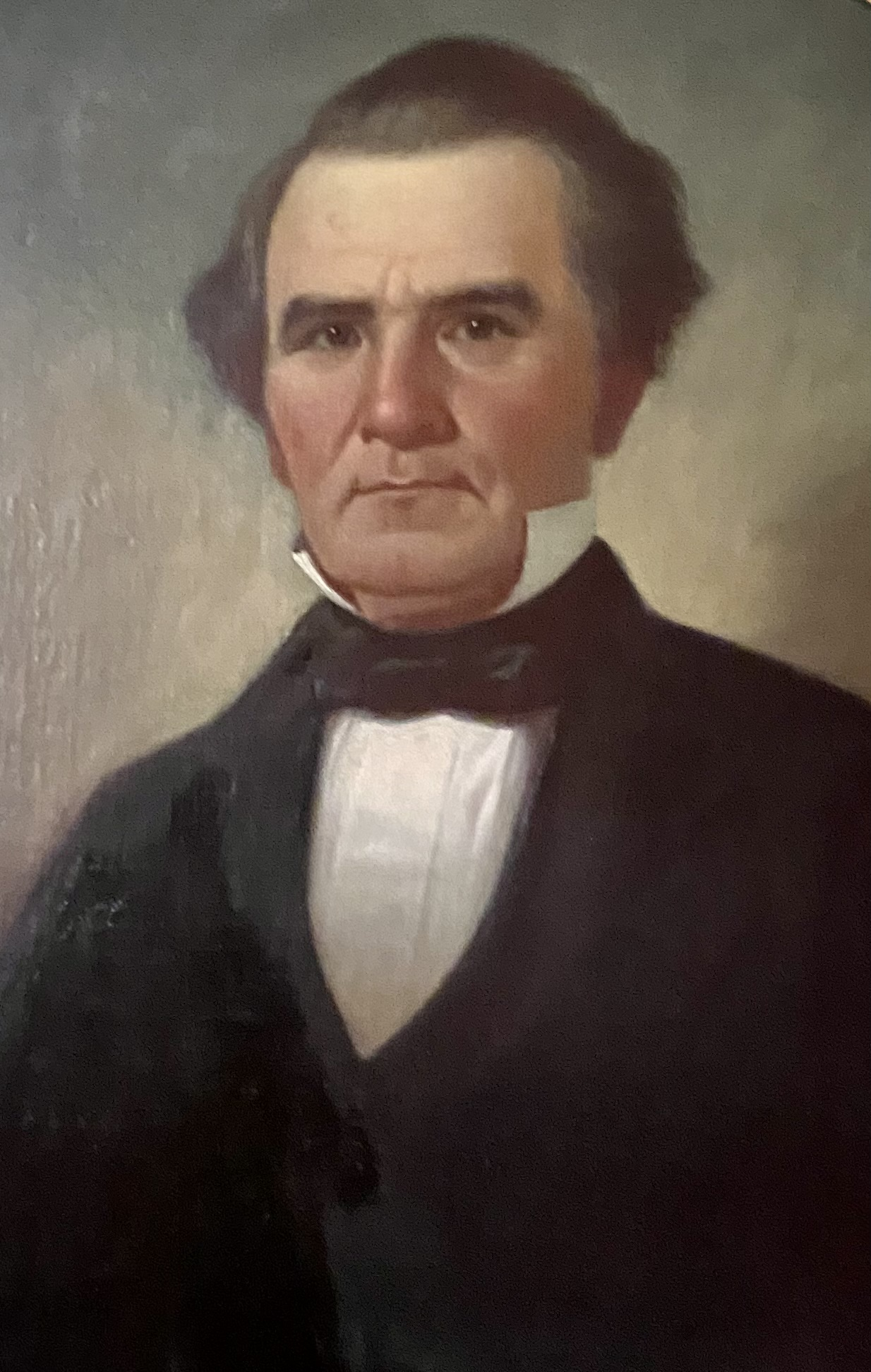

2nd Mayor of Kansas City
- In office February 1854 – April 1855
- Preceded by: William S. Gregory
- Succeeded by: John Johnson

Personal details
- Born: April 15, 1800 Franklin County, Virginia, U.S.
- Died: August 15, 1876 (aged 76) Kansas City, Missouri, U.S.
- Resting place: Union Cemetery; Kansas City, Missouri, U.S.
- Party: Democratic until Civil War
- Relations: Theodore S. Case (son-in-law)

Johnston Lykins (April 15, 1800 – August 15, 1876) was an American Baptist missionary, pioneer, and politician.

== History ==
=== Early life ===
Lykins was born in Franklin County, Virginia on April 15, 1800, the second of 12 children born to David and Jemima Lykins. His childhood was mostly in Kentucky and Indiana. At age 16, he left his family for one year to apprentice with a doctor in Vincennes, Indiana, where he met Baptist missionary Isaac McCoy. Lykins was a student and teacher in Fort Wayne, Indiana.

=== Missionary career ===
He became involved with the missionary work of Isaac McCoy, among the area's native tribes. He joined the McCoy mission to the Wea peoples in northern Indiana in 1819. Lykins was not yet a Christian, and was hired only as a schoolteacher. He spent more time traveling for supplies and assisting the mission's functions than he did teaching school. From 1820 to 1822, he quit several times, but kept returning.

In 1820, McCoy moved his mission west to Fort Wayne, Indiana, and in 1822 moved again west to Michigan Territory. In hostile Potawatomi country, they founded the Carey Mission, which was called the "point from which the American frontier was extended". McCoy baptized Lykins in June 1822 and was soon appointed as a missionary by the Baptist Board of Missions for the United States.

Lykins applied himself diligently to his calling, and by 1824 could read religious discourses in the Potawatomi language. By 1825, he was appointed the official tribal teacher in Michigan and the traveling preacher to the Odawa (Ottawa) and other tribes. In 1828, he married Delilah McCoy, who was his student and Isaac's daughter, becoming Isaac's son-in-law. In 1829, in preparation for major removal westward, Lykins traveled to study medicine for one year at the prestigious Transylvania University in Lexington, Kentucky.

The Indian Removal Act of 1830, of which Lykins and McCoy had originally been good faith advocates, pushed many of the mission's constituents westward. In 1831, Lykins went with them, founding a mission in Missouri near the Shawnee reservation. Other groups' later forceful removals of tribes in 1838 along a similar route are historically commemorated as the Potawatomi Trail of Death.

In 1831, he purchased 16 acres (6.5 ha) in the initial plat for the town of Kansas, Missouri and cofounded the Town of Kansas Company.

He soon achieved a reputation as an effective physician in Missouri. Faced by the desperate need of his tribal students and their families, who were succumbing to various diseases, he read and did what he could medically. A smallpox epidemic hit the Shawnee reservation and Lykins began a vaccination program, an unusual approach by then.

The Baptist mission board approved funds for printing religious tracts in native tribal languages, so in 1833, Jotham Meeker brought the first printing press to the Shawnee Mission. Books in Shawnee, Potawatomi, and other native languages were rapidly produced, to be used in missionary educational programs such as literacy. Lykins was co-author and editor of the Sinwiowe Kesibwi (Shawnee Sun), a small newspaper published entirely in the Shawnee language. In 1837, he wrote and published an Osage language grammar book.

In 1843, Lykins founded a mission in Potawatomi territory at what later became the west side of Topeka, Kansas. That year, some of the tribal elders requested that he be named their tribal physician, a government post that provided him a salary that was necessary to support the mission. His appointment was opposed by the Jesuits and the Potawatomi allied with them, but was granted in 1844. That year, he translated the New Testament into the Potawatomi language.

In 1848, he built a trade school there by constructing the Pottawatomie Baptist Mission Building, and after three years had 90 students. Quarrels abounded between clergy of different Christian denominations and within the same ones. Lykins was an enthusiastic participant in these, and made many enemies. This, compounded by their criticism of his lack of medical credentials, led to his dismissal from the government post of Physician to the Potawatomi in 1851. He left the Potawatomi mission soon after, returning to the Shawnee mission until 1855, when it was closed. At that time he moved to Kansas City, to be near his son.

=== Kansas City life ===
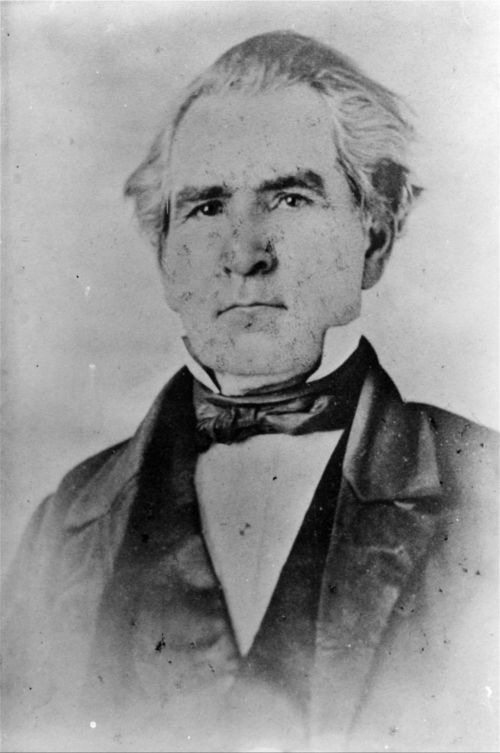
Johnston Lykins in elder life

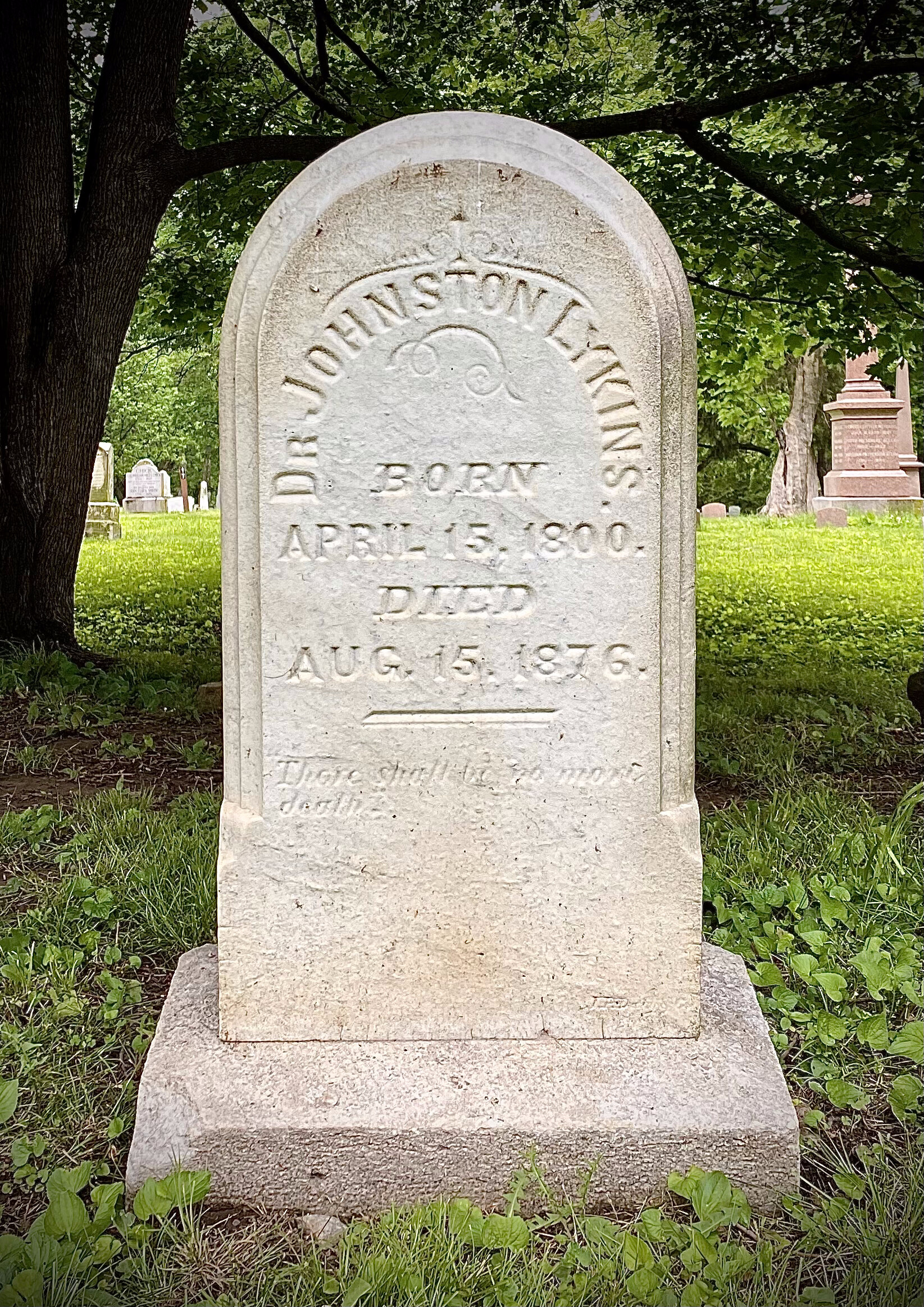
His gravestone is at Union Cemetery.

A Kansas City Public Library historian said Lykins is "possibly associated with more Kansas City 'firsts' than any other early settler". Long before it became Kansas City, he cofounded the town of Kansas, becoming a wealthy civic booster and founding the area's first bank, newspaper, and Baptist church.

In 1831, Lykins had already purchased 16 acres (6.5 ha) in the settlement of Kansas, Missouri and cofounded the Town of Kansas Company. His property extended south from the Missouri River to Fifth and Broadway. He later expanded his holdings to 12th and Washington on Quality Hill.

While residing in Kansas City, Lykins functioned as a medical doctor, partially self-taught. He had no degree, but frontier medical training was often casual. He was the first president of Mechanics Bank.

In 1851, he married a second time, to Martha "Mattie" A. Livingston, a teacher of his daughter Sarah, at a boarding school in Lexington, Missouri. Mattie was 26 years old, having recently moved from Kentucky to work at a boarding school, and he was 51. The couple helped to establish the First Baptist Church in Kansas City in 1855. In the 1880s, Mattie wrote a memoir recalling life in the town of Kansas, through the sacking of Lawrence and the Civil War.

In 1853, the Town of Kansas was reincorporated and renamed City of Kansas. Its first mayor, William Samuel Gregory, served only 10 months when it was discovered that he was not eligible to be mayor because he did not live within the city limits. Lykins was already the first president of the city council, so he became the second mayor and first legally valid mayor. He completed the final two months of Gregory's term and was elected to another one-year term.

From 1856 to 1857, Mattie oversaw construction of the Lykins mansion, the city's first and reportedly the "handsomest residence west of St. Louis". Because the Southern traditional design was "so pretentious that no one in Missouri would attempt to erect the structure", they hired architects and craftsmen from Cincinnati and shipped steel beams from Pittsburgh. While most citizens saw wooden sidewalks and muddy streets roamed by livestock, this Greek classic revival, or neoclassical, style two-story brick mansion with red painted walls had 14 rooms, 10 fireplaces, circular staircases, and crystal chandeliers. The main hall was 15 feet (4.6 m) wide. It was often a gathering space for community representatives to discuss civil and political issues. Separate apartment buildings were in the rear for the 33-year-old enslaved woman and three children. The house was frequented by Kansas City leader Kersey Coates and his young daughter, "presided over by a host and hostess of the old regime of Southern hospitality [which] afforded a degree of enchantment of which the most exaggerate fairy tale certainly has no prototype". The pet parrot, Florita, spoke profanity that "shocked and delighted". After Johnston's death, his widow Mattie married artist George Caleb Bingham, and they lived there. It became an early site of the Barstow School for Girls. It was renovated into the Mondamin Hotel, and then Roslin Hotel. The Kansas City Star lamented its demolition in late 1990 as an icon of the cultural failure of the developers, the city government, and the public, to preserve historical architecture.

== Death ==
Lykins resided in Kansas City until his death on August 15, 1876, aged 76. Mattie was his caregiver in his final weeks of peaceful infirmity. She married artist and family friend George Caleb Bingham, and they lived at the original Lykins mansion. All three are buried in neighboring plots of "founder's row" at Union Cemetery in Kansas City.

== Legacy ==
His namesake Lykins neighborhood is in the Historic Northeast district of Kansas City, directly east of his first mansion. It is characterized by an internationally diverse population including immigrants and refugees. The Lykins Neighborhood Association (LNA) became an exemplar of rehabilitation from historic blight caused by racist housing policies set by JC Nichols in the early to mid 1950s. The demolished Lykins School was north of the northeast corner of Lykins Square Park.

His published bibliography includes the languages of Kansa, Delaware, Potawatomi, Munsee, Otoe, Osage, Iowa, Piankehsaw, and Shawnee. Long after his lifetime, the Pottawatomie Baptist Mission Building was restored and repurposed, and finally became a museum for the Kansas Historical Society next to its headquarters.

Preceded by William S. Gregory	Mayor of Kansas City, Missouri; 1854–1855	Succeeded by John Johnson
