= Oliver Wood (general) =

American Union brevet brigadier general

Oliver Wood (June 25, 1825 – June 25, 1893) was a Union Army colonel during the American Civil War.

Oliver Wood began his Civil War service as a first lieutenant in the three-month 22nd Ohio Infantry Regiment. He was mustered out of the volunteers on August 19, 1861. After serving as a captain from November 1, 1861 and major from May 10, 1862, Wood was appointed colonel in command of the 22nd Ohio Infantry Regiment, September 16, 1862. After being mustered out of the Volunteers on November 18, 1864, Wood was appointed colonel of the 4th United States Veteran Volunteer Infantry, December 29, 1864. He held temporary brigade commands during parts of late 1862, 1863 and 1864 with the Army of the Tennessee, the Army of Arkansas and the Department of Arkansas. He was mustered out of the volunteers again on March 1, 1866.

On February 24, 1866, President Andrew Johnson nominated Wood for appointment to the grade of brevet brigadier general of volunteers, to rank from March 13, 1865, and the United States Senate confirmed the appointment on April 10, 1866.

Wood was a postmaster and judge after the war. Oliver Wood died at Port Townsend, Washington, June 25, 1893. He was buried at Laurel Grove Cemetery, Port Townsend.

== See also ==
- List of American Civil War brevet generals (Union)
