= Charles Wright Miner =

United States Army general (1840–1928)

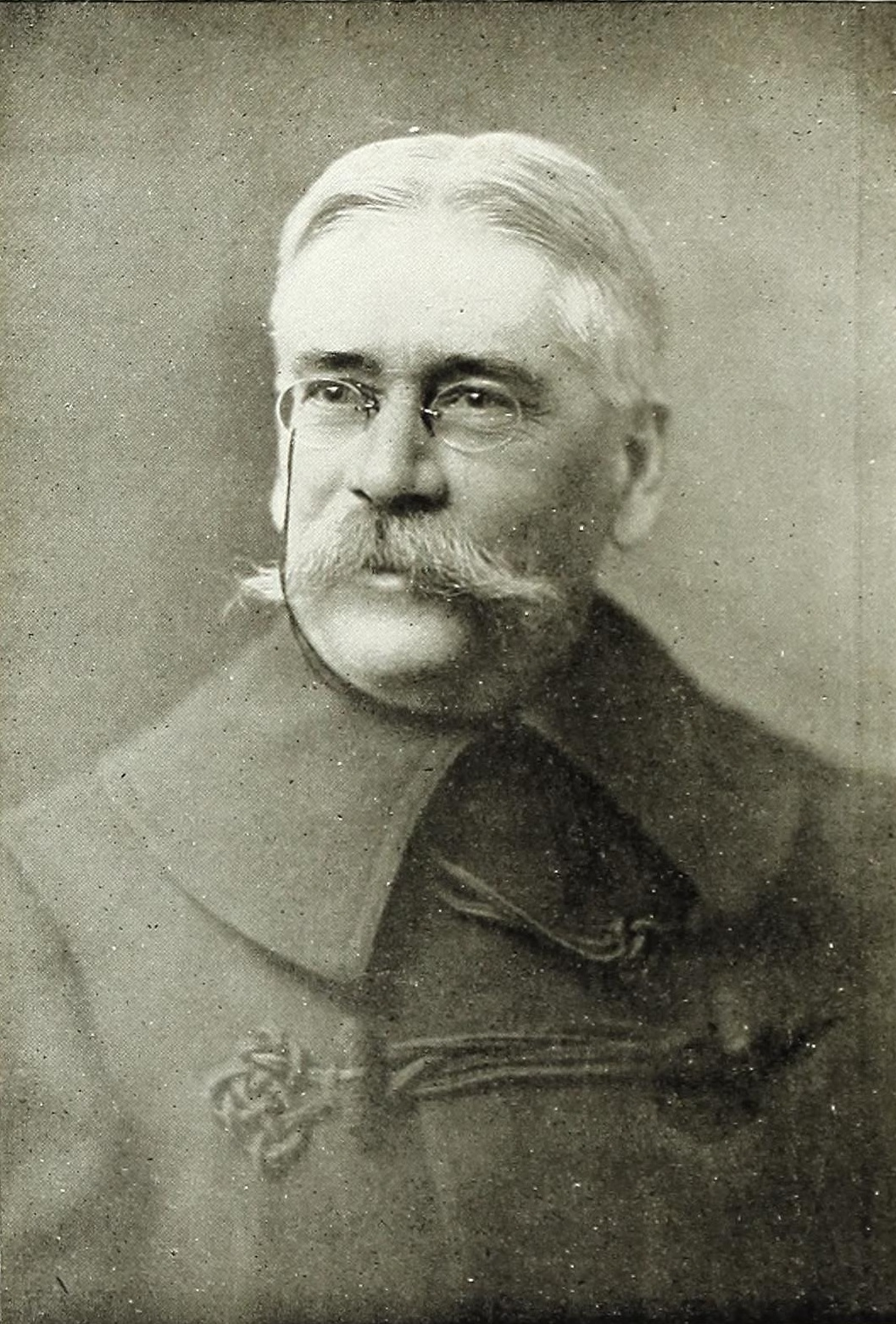
- Miner as a colonel in 1903
- Born: November 21, 1840; Cincinnati, Ohio, US
- Died: September 27, 1928 (aged 87); Columbus, Ohio, US
- Burial place: Green Lawn Cemetery, Columbus, Ohio, US
- Spouse: Isabella "Belle" L. Cooley (m. 1870–1924)
- Military career
- Allegiance: Union (American Civil War); United States
- Service: Union Army; United States Army
- Service years: 1861, 1862–1865 (Union Army); 1866–1903 (US Army)
- Rank: Brigadier General
- Unit: US Army Infantry Branch
- Commands: 6th Infantry Regiment; Negros, Philippines; US Army General Service and Staff College
- Wars: American Civil War; American Indian Wars; Spanish–American War; Philippine–American War

Charles Wright Miner (21 November 1840 – 27 September 1928) was a career officer in the United States Army. A Union Army veteran of the American Civil War, Miner continued his career in the US Army, and was a veteran of the American Indian Wars, Spanish–American War, and Philippine–American War. He attained the rank of brigadier general in July 1903 under the provisions of a law permitting advancement by one grade of Union veterans still on active duty who were not general officers and had served for 35 years, and he retired a day later.

== Early life and start of career ==
Charles Wright Miner was born in Cincinnati on 21 November 1840, a son of attorney and judge John L. Miner and Mary (Wright) Miner. He was educated in the public schools of Cincinnati, and in April 1861 he enlisted in the Union Army for the American Civil War. He joined the 2nd Ohio Infantry Regiment, a unit raised for three months of service. The regiment took part in the Civil War Defenses of Washington and the First Battle of Bull Run, and was mustered out in August 1861. In May 1862, Miner returned to service when he was commissioned as a captain in the 22nd Ohio Infantry Regiment. He served until the end of the war, and took part in the campaigns of the Army of the Tennessee, including the Battle of Shiloh and Siege of Vicksburg. Miner mustered out in August 1865.

In March 1866, Miner returned to service as a second lieutenant in the 19th Infantry Regiment. He transferred to the 28th Infantry Regiment in September 1866 and was promoted to first lieutenant in January 1867. In March 1867, he was promoted to captain and assigned to the 22nd Infantry Regiment. Miner served during the American Indian Wars, and in February 1890 received a brevet promotion to major to recognize his heroism during October 1876 skirmishes against the Sioux near what is now Glendive, Montana. Miner was leading a wagon train to an army cantonment on the Tongue River when it was attacked, resulting in the capture of several animals, which forced the train to return to its start point. Expedition commander Elwell Stephen Otis replaced civilian waggoneers with soldiers, provided an armed escort, and dispatched the wagon train for a second attempt. When it was attacked again, Miner was among a contingent of soldiers who repeatedly charged the Sioux, which ended the attack by causing them to disperse.

== Later career ==
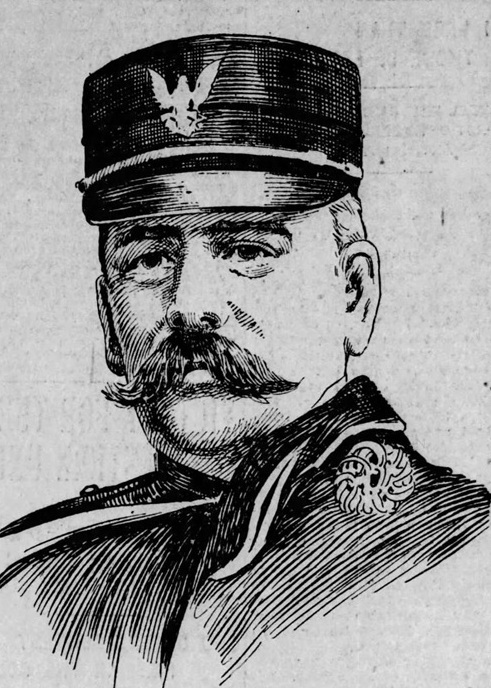
Miner as a colonel in 1900.

Miner was promoted to major in the 6th Infantry in December 1894. He was promoted to lieutenant colonel in July 1898, and was the regiment during its Spanish–American War participation in the Battle of San Juan Hill and Siege of Santiago. He was promoted to colonel as commander of the 6th Infantry in December 1899 and took part in the Philippine–American War, including assignment as military governor of the island of Negros. From September 1902 to June 1903, Miner was commander of the General Service and Staff College at Fort Leavenworth, Kansas (now the Commandant of the United States Army Command and General Staff College).

In July 1903, the US Congress enacted legislation permitting currently serving Union Army veterans at the rank of colonel to be advanced one grade and retired early if they had served for 35 years; Miner was promoted to brigadier general on 29 July. He then requested early retirement, which was approved on 30 July, about 18 months before he would have reached the mandatory retirement age of 64. In retirement, Miner was a resident of Columbus, Ohio. He died in Columbus on 27 September 1928 and was buried at Green Lawn Cemetery in Columbus.

== Dates of rank ==
Miner's dates of rank were:

- Private, 17 April 1861 to 9 August 1861
- Captain, 1 May 1862 to 28 August 1865
- Second Lieutenant, 31 March 1866
- First Lieutenant, 1 January 1867
- Captain, 7 March 1867
- Major (Brevet), 27 February 1890
- Major, 29 December 1894
- Lieutenant Colonel, 1 July 1898
- Colonel, 15 December 1899
- Brigadier General, 29 July 1903
- Brigadier General (Retired), 30 June 1903
