= Theodore S. Case =

American businessman, military officer, professor and physician (1832–1900)

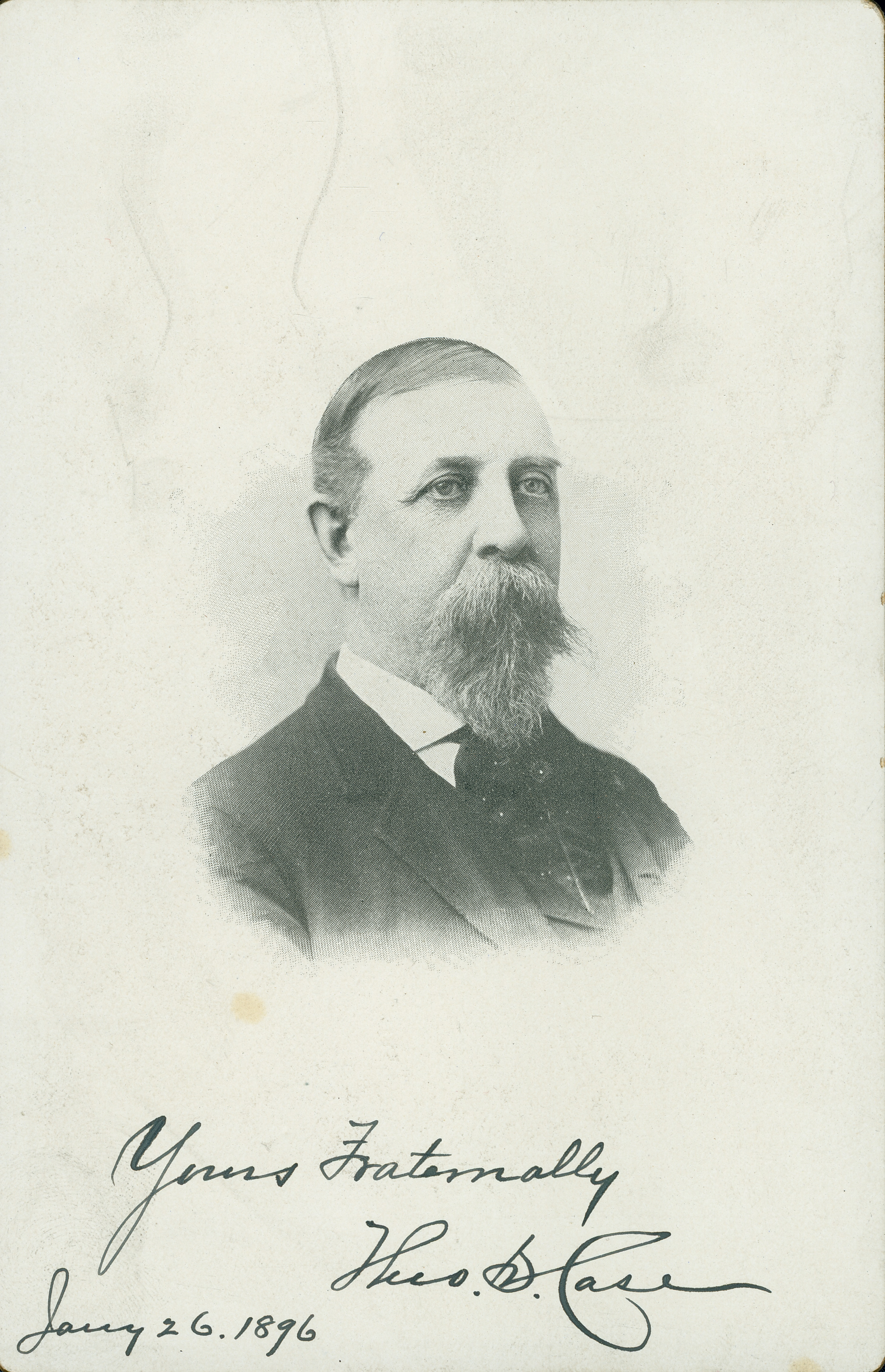
- 1896 portrait of Case
- Born: Theodore Spencer Case; January 26, 1832; Jackson, Georgia, US
- Died: February 16, 1900 (aged 68); Kansas City, Missouri, US
- Burial place: Elmwood Cemetery
- Education: Marietta College; Ohio State University College of Medicine
- Children: 3
- Relatives: Johnston Lykins (father-in-law)
- Military career
- Allegiance: Union
- Service: Union army
- Rank: Quartermaster general
- Unit: 22nd Ohio Infantry Regiment
- Wars: American Civil War

Theodore Spencer Case (January 26, 1832 – February 16, 1900) was an American businessman, military officer, professor and physician.

== Biography ==
Case was born on January 26, 1832, in Jackson, Georgia, the oldest of four, to Ermine and Mary A. Case (née Cowles). They later moved to Columbus, Ohio. He attended Marietta College, graduating in 1851, with a Master of Arts. He taught mathematics before attending the Ohio State University College of Medicine, graduating in 1853, with a Doctor of Medicine. He worked as a physician at the Ohio Penitentiary.

In spring 1857, Case moved to the Town of Kansas. He married Julia Lykins, daughter of Johnston Lykins, in 1858. In 1860, he was elected alderman of the Town of Kansas, and was one of few votes for Abraham Lincoln in Missouri.

During the American Civil War, Case enlisted to the 22nd Ohio Infantry Regiment, serving under Robert T. Van Horn. He reached the rank of quartermaster general, and was appointed quartermaster of Missouri.

After the war, he became a pioneer of Kansas City, amassing a large amount of real estate in the city. In March 1866, Thomas Clement Fletcher appointed him railroad commissioner of Missouri. From 1866 to 1868, he was curator for the University of Missouri. In March 1873, Ulysses S. Grant appointed him postmaster of Kansas City, later being reappointed by Rutherford B. Hayes and Chester A. Arthur.

He attended the University of Missouri–Kansas City, graduating in 1883, with a Doctor of Philosophy. He became a professor of chemistry at the University of Kansas Health System. In 1891, he was appointed Treasurer of Kansas City, later being elected. He was a member of the Grand Army of the Republic. He died on February 16, 1900, aged 68, in Kansas City, Missouri, and is buried in Elmwood Cemetery.
