= Marvin Harvey (basketball) =

American basketball player-coach

Marvin Wayne Harvey (born May 12, 1954) is an American basketball shooting instructor, former college player and coach, who currently owns and runs the trademarked Shot Lab™ in Tampa, Florida and the Marvin Harvey Basketball School of Excellence.

He has been a shooting instructor and coach since 1982. As a basketball coach he has won over 400 games at the high school and college level. Over the past 28 years he has trained the best shooters in the world on every level. Two of his most notable students are Raja Bell and Tamika Catchings. He is known as the "Shot Doctor".

== Early years ==
Harvey was born in Kansas City, Missouri. He graduated from Paseo High School. Harvey decided to try out for the Penn Valley Community College basketball team. After playing two years at Penn Valley, Harvey was offered a scholarship to play basketball at Ottawa University, where he eventually graduated in 1980. In 1982, Harvey tried out for the NBA in Los Angeles, California. After making the final cut, he was then chosen by Marty Blake (then Chief Scout of the NBA) to attend two other training camps for different NBA teams.

== Kansas/Missouri ==
Marvin Harvey became the head coach for the boys' and girls' basketball teams at Santa Fe Trail Jr. High School in Olathe, Kansas. During this time he coached the boys' team to three one-loss seasons. In 1983 however, he became the Shooting Coach for the University of Kansas Women's Basketball, after which, he was the Shooting Coach for every major college and university in Missouri and Kansas. He started the first individual and small group, Player Development program in the State of Kansas; the Basketball Workshop. While gaining attention and exposure from his program, Harvey began training his first NBA player Clay Johnson. Clay Johnson would eventually win an NBA Championship with the Los Angeles Lakers. During the same summer he toured the United States as the "Shot Doctor" with top NCAA Women Basketball Coaches (World-Wide Sports) for the Lynette Woodard free basketball camps. The tours conducted free clinics with the help of top-name coaches and players across the country and discussed drugs, character, commitment, and what it means to be a student-athlete. Harvey wrote, and produced a thirty-minute video, "Shooting the Basketball", sold across the country with a free instructional development shooting poster.

== Florida/Alabama/Texas ==
From 1991 to 1993 Marvin Harvey tour the State of Florida, from Miami to Pensacola to teaching girls how to shoot a basketball correctly. From that tour, in 1993, Harvey became the Athletic Director for Pine Castle Christian Academy in Orlando, FL. Harvey was there for six years and during that timethe Academy was nominated three times for the Fred E. Rozelle Sportsmanship Award. He had a one-year tenure as a Women's Basketball Assistant Coach for the University of South Alabama. The following year, he became the Head Coach of the now defunct NWBL's Alabama Mobile. During this time he also worked as a Liaison for the NCAA Sports Program at Bishop State Community College. Here he worked with at risk children, trying to get them out of the at-risk system and on a more sensible track.

In 2000, Harvey retired from teaching and coaching to focus on "Individual Player Development". He moved to Houston, Texas, where he trained college and pro players at the Tony Westside Tennis Club with John Lucas II. He also worked training camps and served as a shooting coach for the WNBA Houston Comets, he was allowed to attend the Houston Rockets workouts under Rudy Tomjanovich. At the same time, he was hired by Antonio Lang, NBA Philadelphia 76ers to transform his game from the forward position to the guard position.

2001 marked his return to the state of Florida where he started his non-profit organization C5D Inc, and a for-profit Harvey's "Shooter's Touch" Academy. In August 2002 Marvin Harvey received awards (Sensei) in Bogotá, Colombia for training international teams in the SaludCup, FIBA Basketball Association. He trained teams and introduced his Shooting Information to coaches from Europe, Brazil, Colombia, Mexico, Dominican Republic, and Cuba.

2003, he took HSTA/Shot Lab LLC on the road, and became the Shooting Director at the RDV Sports Complex, Home to the NBA Orlando Magic; this is where he introduced "video-analysis" for NBA players. The following year Harvey became the Director of Basketball Operations at Champions Sports Complex of Orlando, Home to HSTA/Shot Lab. After working at Champions Sports Complex for two years, he became the Director of Basketball Operations at the EDGE Training Facility, Home to HSTA. In 2005, Marvin Harvey extended his basketball training program in Monterrey, Mexico, where he met Vicente Fox, then President of Mexico.

== 2008–Present ==
In 2008, Marvin Harvey partnered with a South African Petroleum Company Engen and Octagan Marketing Company to produce a Coaches DVD to help build basketball programs and TV visibility in South Africa, from Johannesburg, Cape Town, to Durban. Later in 2008, Harvey moved C5D Inc Foundation and Harvey's "Shooters Touch" Academy to Tampa, Florida. HSTA opened operations in Monterrey, Mexico (the New Fundamentals Series) in partnership with American School of Fundamentals in Monterrey, Mexico. 2009 marked the creation of the Shot Lab. The most comprehensive break down of the shooting form and the mechanics of shooting a basketball in the world.

The Shot Lab has been the place where College players like John Henson (University of North Carolina at Chapel Hill) and Dominique Jones (University of South Florida) and WNBA Players like Alana Beard (Washington Mystics), Marie Ferdinand-Harris (Los Angeles Sparks), and Armintie Price (Atlanta Dream) found information regarding shooting development. In 2009 Harvey was officially brought on as the shooting coach of the WNBA Eastern Conference Champion Indiana Fever.

In 2010 Harvey authored three books Winning Within Reason, The New Fundamentals: Coaches Manual, and The New Fundamentals: Coaches Workbook. His 2010 Spring Tour included Italy, France, Serbia, Georgia, and Turkey. His summer teaching tour includes the National Basketball Team of Rwanda, Africa, Sao Paulo, Brazil, Colombia, Australia, and Japan.

Harvey joined the Winthrop University Women's Basketball coaching staff for two years (2015–2017) to study shooting percentages and present the Fusion Rehab on the college level, immediately after he created the Eight to IX Lab in Rock Hill, South Carolina and in Jacksonville, Florida. where he transitions players elementary skill-sets to pro skill-sets.

== Books ==
- Harvey, Marvin (2010). Winning Within Reason. ISBN 978-0-9828212-0-6.
- Harvey, Marvin (2010). Seven Principles for Teaching Basketball: Coaches Manual. ISBN 978-0-9828212-1-3.
- Harvey, Marvin (2010). Seven Principles for Teaching Basketball: Work Book. ISBN 978-0-9828212-2-0.
