= 22nd Ohio Infantry Regiment =

22nd Ohio Infantry Regiment; 13th Missouri Infantry Regiment
- Active: April 1861 to August 19, 1861 (3 months); >November 5, 1861, to July 18, 1865 (3 years)
- Country: United States
- Allegiance: Union
- Branch: Union Army
- Type: Infantry
- Size: Regiment
- Engagements: Battle of Fort Henry; Battle of Fort Donelson; Battle of Shiloh; Siege of Corinth; Battle of Iuka; Second Battle of Corinth; Siege of Vicksburg; Steele's Expedition to Little Rock; Battle of Bayou Fourche; Capture of Little Rock

The 22nd Ohio Infantry Regiment, originally mustered in as the 13th Missouri Infantry Regiment, was an infantry regiment in the Union Army during the American Civil War.

== Service ==
=== Three-months regiment ===
The 22nd Ohio Infantry Regiment (Three Months Service) was organized at Camp Jackson in Columbus, Ohio April through May 1861 in response to President Lincoln's call for 75,000 volunteers and mustered into service on May 23, 1861. The regiment moved to Parkersburg, Virginia, May 30, then to Burning Springs, Elizabethtown, and to Three Forks. The regiment was attached to Cox's Brigade, District of the Kanawha. It participated in operations against guerrillas in Gilmer, Calhoun and Braxton Counties and railroad guard duty until August. It mustered out on August 19, 1861, by John R. Edie, Major 15th Infantry U.S.A., Mustering Officer. The 22nd Ohio Infantry (3 Months Service) does not share lineage with the subsequent 22nd Ohio Volunteer Infantry (3 Years Service).

=== Three-years regiment ===
The 22nd Ohio Infantry (Three Years Service) was organized at Benton Barracks in St. Louis, Missouri, originally mustered in as the 13th Missouri Volunteer Infantry (two companies were recruited in St. Louis and one was recruited in Illinois; the remainder were recruited in Ohio). It mustered in for three years service on November 5, 1861. The regiment's designation was officially changed to the 22nd Ohio Volunteer Infantry on July 7, 1862.

The regiment was attached to 2nd Brigade, 2nd Division, District of West Tennessee and Army of the Tennessee, to July 1862. 2nd Brigade, 2nd Division, District of Corinth, Mississippi, to September 1862. 1st Brigade, 2nd Division, District of Corinth, Mississippi, to October 1862. 2nd Brigade, 2nd Division, District of Corinth, Mississippi, to November 1862. 2nd Brigade, District of Corinth, Mississippi, XIII Corps, Department of the Tennessee, to December 1862. 2nd Brigade, District of Corinth, XVII Corps, to January 1863. 4th Brigade, District of Jackson, XVI Corps, Army of the Tennessee, to March 1863. 2nd Brigade, 3rd Division, XVI Corps, to May 1863. Kimball's Provisional Division, XVI Corps, to July 1863. 2nd Brigade, Kimball's Division, District of Eastern Arkansas, to August 1863. 2nd Brigade, 2nd Division, Arkansas Expedition, to January 1864. 2nd Brigade, 2nd Division, VII Corps, Department of Arkansas, to March 1864. 3rd Brigade, 3rd Division, VII Corps, Department of Arkansas, to May 1864. 2nd Brigade, 2nd Division, VII Corps, to February 1865. 1st Brigade, 3rd Division, VII Corps, to August 1865.

The 22nd Ohio Infantry mustered out of service on August 28, 1865, having been reduced to two companies on November 18, 1864, when most of the regiment mustered out due to the expiration of their enlistments.

== Detailed service ==
Reconnaissance from Smithland, Ky., toward Fort Henry, Tenn., January 31-February 2. Operations against Fort Henry, Tenn., February 2–6. Capture of Fort Henry February 6. Investment and capture of Fort Donelson, Tenn., February 12–16. Expedition to Clarksville and Nashville, Tenn., February 22-March 5. Moved to Pittsburg Landing, Tenn., March 14–17. Battle of Shiloh April 6–7. Advance on and siege of Corinth, Miss., April 29-May 30. Pursuit to Booneville June 1–6. Duty at Corinth, Miss., until October. Expedition to Iuka, Miss., September 17–19. Battle of Corinth October 3–4. Pursuit to Ripley October 5–12. Box Ford, Hatchie River October 7 (3 companies). Near Ruckersville October 7 (detachment). Near Ripley October 7 (detachment). Garrison at Trenton and duty along line of the Mobile & Ohio Railroad until March 1863. Near Yorkville January 28, 1863. Dyersburg January 30. Moved to Jackson, Tenn., March 11, thence to Corinth, Miss., April 29, and return to Jackson, Tenn., May 3. Ordered to Memphis, Tenn., May 20, then to Vicksburg, Miss., June 1. Siege of Vicksburg June 3-July 4. Surrender of Vicksburg July 4. Ordered to Helena, Ark., July 16. Steele's Expedition to Little Rock, Ark., August 13-September 10. Bayou Fourche and capture of Little Rock September 10. Duty at Little Rock until October 28. Ordered to Brownsville October 28, and duty there until October 24, 1864. Near Searcy May 18, 1864. Near Brownsville July 13. Near Searcy August 13. Ordered to Camp Dennison, Columbus, Ohio, October 24.

== Casualties ==
The regiment lost a total of 207 men during service; 2 officers and 36 enlisted men killed or mortally wounded, 2 officers and 167 enlisted men died of disease.

== Commanders ==
- Colonel Oliver Wood
- Quartermaster general Theodore S. Case

== Notable members ==
Charles Wright Miner, who remained in the army until 1903 and retired as a brigadier general.

== See also ==
- List of Ohio Civil War units
- Ohio in the Civil War
