= Tauy Jones House =

Historic place in Kansas, United States

- U.S. National Register of Historic Places
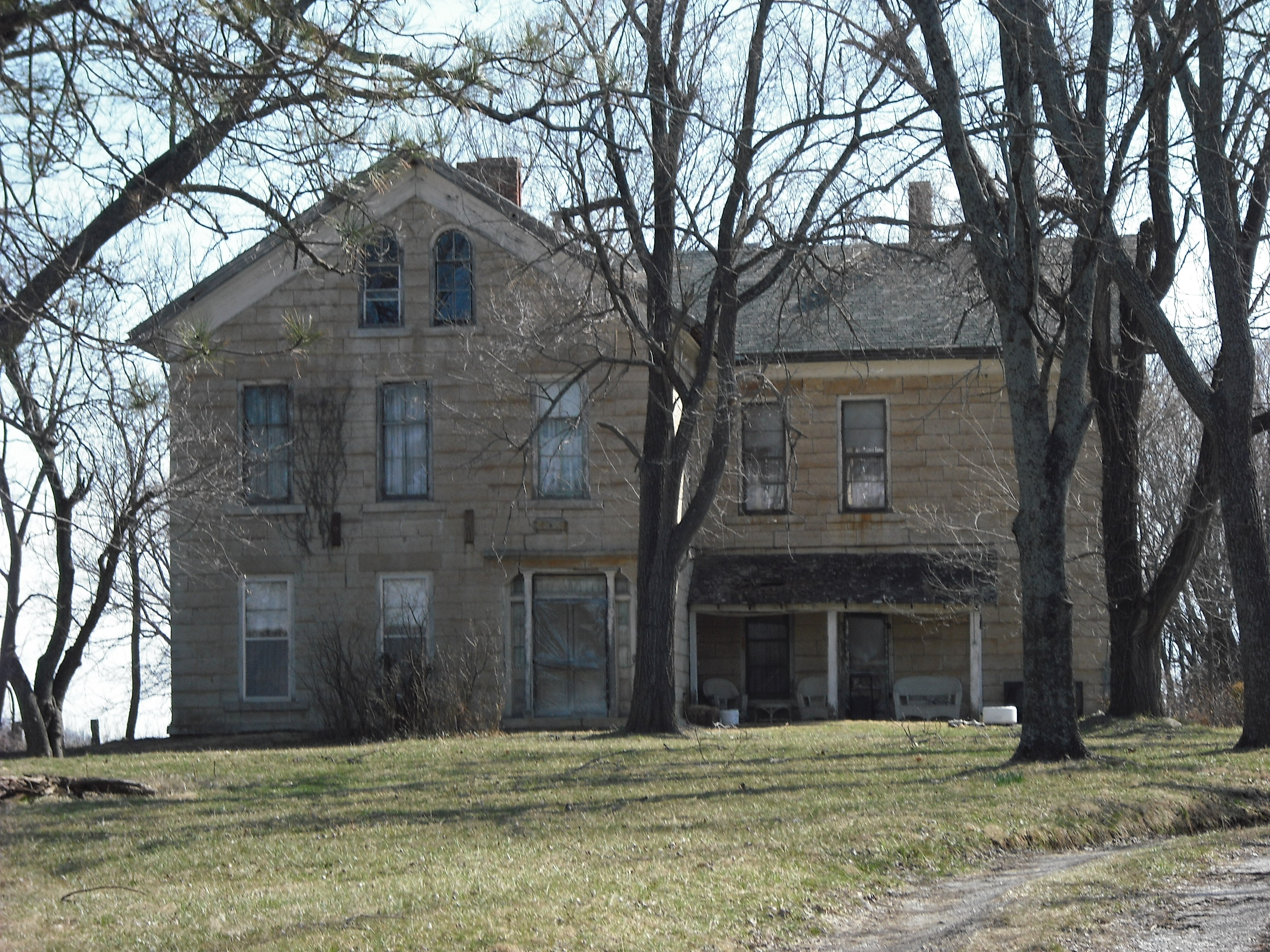

- Location within Kansas
- Nearest city: Ottawa, Kansas
- Coordinates: 38°39′51″N 95°13′14″W
- Area: 2 acres (0.81 ha)
- Built: 1863
- NRHP reference No.: 72000503
- Added to NRHP: June 19, 1972

The Tauy Jones House in Ottawa, Kansas is a historic building that was the home of John Tecumseh "Tauy" Jones, who was of half Chippewa heritage and served as an interpreter for the Pottawatomie, a leader and minister for the Ottawa tribe, a friend of John Brown, and a co-founder of Ottawa University.

The sandstone house was built in 1863 to 1867 on the site of Tauy Jones' 1843 log trading post and hotel which was destroyed by pro-slavery arsonists in 1856 who were attempting to kill Jones. The stone was quarried near Fort Scott, Kansas and transported by wagon. John Brown often stayed nearby in the grove on the other side of the creek. There were unverified legends that the house was a stop on the Underground Railroad and that Abraham Lincoln slept at the house, however, it is verified Horace Greeley did visit the Jones family.

The house was added to the National Register of Historic Places on June 19, 1972.
