= Leonard Erickson =

Dr. Leonard C. Erickson
- Born: December 17, 1946; Waltham, Massachusetts
- Died: May 19, 2013 (aged 66)
- Education: Florida State University
- Known for: Leading the Indiana University Cancer Center; Notable researcher of DNA repair
- Awards: Won the Robert Wallace Miller endowed professorship
- Scientific career
- Fields: Oncology
- Workplaces: Indiana University; IUPUI
- Doctoral advisor: J. Herbert Taylor

Leonard C. Erickson was the Robert Wallace Miller Professor of Oncology at the Department of Pharmacology & Toxicology at Indiana University-Purdue University Indianapolis Cancer Center, and he also served as Deputy Director of the Indiana University Cancer Center.

== Biography ==
Born in Waltham, Massachusetts, Leonard Erickson earned a Bachelor of Arts degree in Biology from Ottawa University in 1968. He received both his master's degree in Biology and Genetics in 1972, and his Doctorate in Biology and Genetics in 1974 from Florida State University.

From 1974 - 1983 Erickson held the positions of Senior Staff Fellow, Expert Investigator, and Senior Investigator at the National Cancer Institute.

From 1983 - 1996, Erickson served as a Research Professor at Loyola University Chicago. In 1996 he joined the Indiana University School of Medicine faculty as a full Professor. In 1998 he was named the Robert Wallace Miller Scholar, and in 2003 he was named Deputy Director of the Indiana University Cancer Center.

Erickson died at the age of 66 on May 19, 2013. His residence was located in Zionsville, Indiana.

== Awards ==
In 1998, he was appointed to the Robert Wallace Miller endowed professorship.
