= Pottawatomie Baptist Mission Building =

Historic church in Kansas, United States

- U.S. National Register of Historic Places
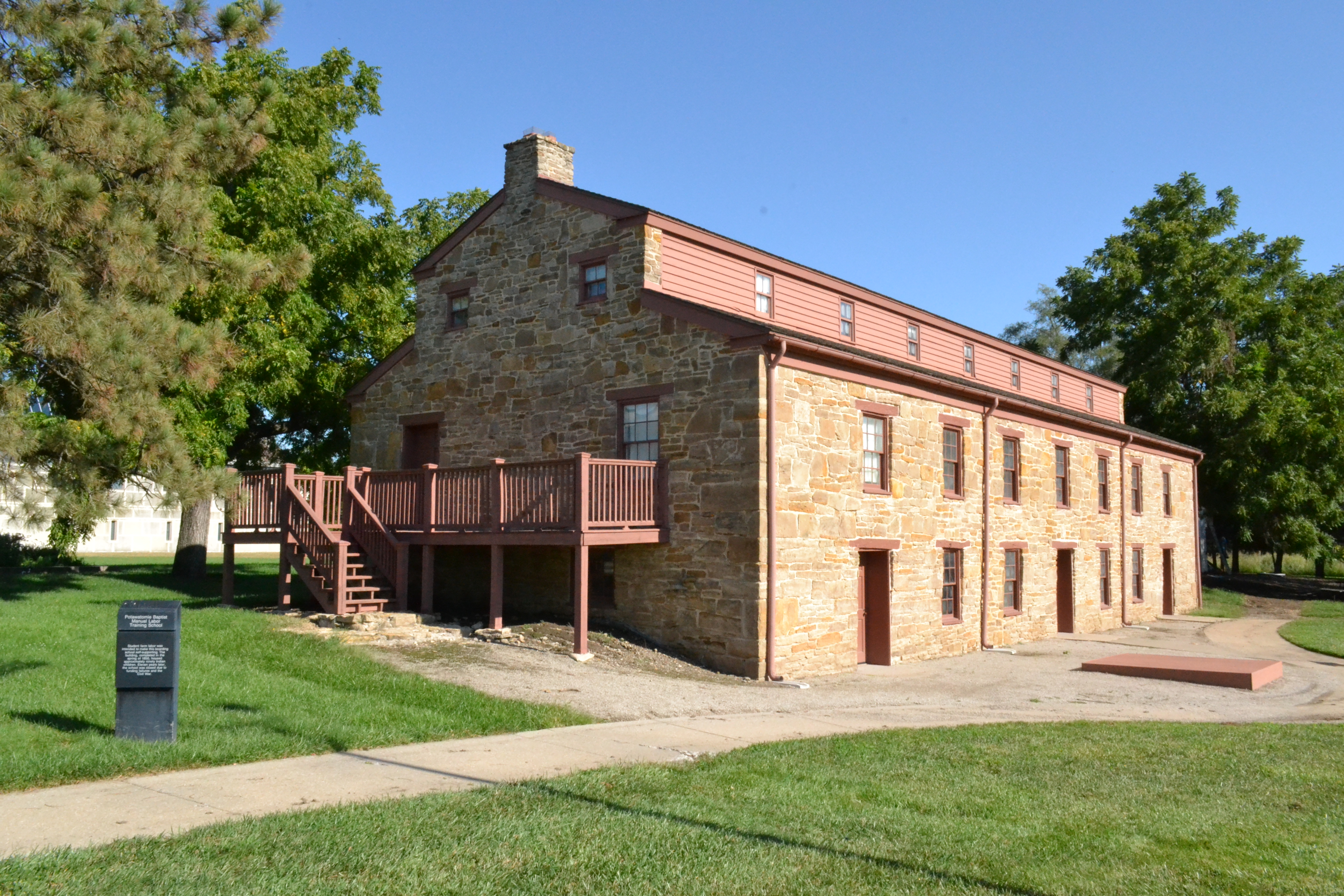
- The Pottawatomie Baptist Mission Building in 2017

- Location within Kansas Location within the United States
- Location: Off W. 6th St., 0.5 mi. W of Wanamaker Rd., Topeka, Kansas
- Coordinates: 39.05641°N 95.77467°W
- Area: 2 acres (0.81 ha)
- Built: 1849; 177 years ago
- NRHP reference No.: 71001089
- Added to NRHP: September 3, 1971

The Pottawatomie Baptist Mission Building is a historic mission off SW 6th Avenue, two-thirds of a mile west of Wanamaker Road in Topeka, Kansas. It was built in 1849 and added to the National Register of Historic Places in 1971.

It was built to serve Pottawatomie Native Americans who had been forcibly removed along the Potawatomi Trail of Death in 1838 from the Ohio region to a reservation on the Kansas River west of Topeka. Baptist missionaries Robert Simerwell and Reverend Johnston Lykins came to the reservation in 1848, from the nearby Shawnee mission. Lykins petitioned for, designed, and oversaw the construction of the building at a cost to the federal government of US$4,800 (equivalent to about $179,000 in 2025).

As a school, it was a three-story building made of ashlar stone 85 by 35 feet (26 m × 11 m) in plan, with 12 rooms and 60 windows and doors.

It was closed in 1861 because its administrator, the Southern Baptist Convention, was identified with the Confederate States of America during Bleeding Kansas and leading up to the American Civil War. The 320 acres (130 ha) of land was sold to Robert I. Lee and the building was remodeled into a race horse barn. It is now owned by the Kansas Historical Society as a museum component.

It is one of the oldest buildings in the Kansas, and is the only surviving historical structure of pioneering Baptist missions in Kansas.
