= Carey Mission =

Baptist mission near Niles, Michigan, U.S.

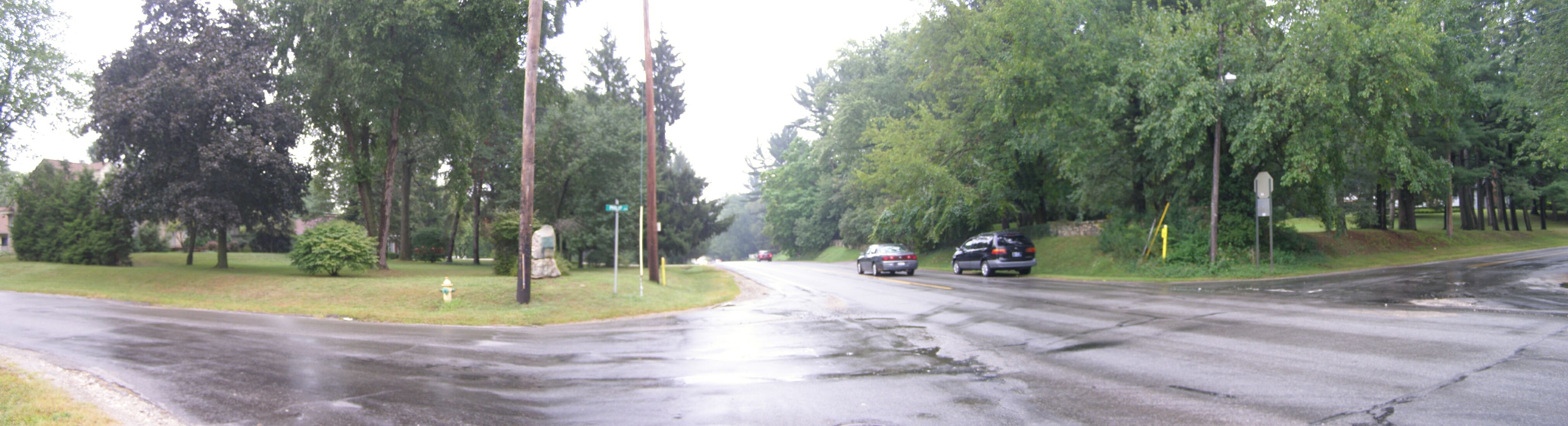
Carey Mission School Site is west of Niles, Michigan, on Niles Buchanan Rd.

Carey Mission was established in December 1822 by Baptist missionary Isaac McCoy among the Potawatomi tribe of American Indians on the St. Joseph River near Niles, Michigan, United States. It was named for English Baptist missionary William Carey. Its official nature and reputation made it a headquarters for settlers and an edge of the American frontier.

== History ==
Lewis Cass, the second governor of the Michigan Territory, signed the 1821 Treaty of Chicago on August 29, 1821, with the chiefs of the Ottawa, Chippewa, and Potawatomi nations. The Potawatomi agreed to cede to the United States all the territory lying west and north of the St. Joseph River, and the United States agreed to provide funds for a blacksmith and a teacher, to reside on "one mile square on the south side of the St. Joseph" within a tract that the Potawatomis had reserved for their villages. McCoy, who had previously traveled to Detroit and petitioned Cass to provide funds for Indian missions in the 1821 Treaty, secured the position of teacher.

In December 1822, a 32-person party consisting of McCoy, his family, and a group of Indians who had elected to accompany them, departed for southwestern Michigan. They emigrated from the vicinity of Fort Wayne, Indiana, to a point about one mile west of the present city of Niles, and by the following year they had built six mission houses.

The first school at Carey was opened on January 27, 1823, and originally had 30 Indian pupils. An expedition that visited the mission in June 1823 reported, "The school consists of from forty to sixty children, of which fifteen are females. They are either children of Indians, or half-breed descendants of French and Indian parents; there being about an equal number of each. It is contemplated that the school will soon be increased to one hundred."

In 1824, an agent for Cass reported that the Carey Mission was "a colony firmly settled, numerous, civilized and happy". Fifty densely wooded acres had been cleared and fenced, and workers had raised large amounts of corn, oats, and potatoes. By 1826, over 200 acres (0.81 km^{2}) of land had been cleared, and 58 acres (230,000 m^{2}) had been planted.

The mission became a waystation for white settlers of the Michigan Territory. McCoy realized that they would soon supplant the native Indians. He wrote: "Our location was so remote from the settlements of white people when we first made it, and the inconveniences of reaching and residing at it so great, that we hoped, at that time, to be able to push forward the work of civilization to a state not much liable to injury by the proximity of white population, before we should be crowded by it."

During the period from 1827 to 1829, southwestern Michigan began to be actively settled, and the Carey Mission declined, as a result of the U.S. policy of Indian removal. In 1827, in the Treaty of St. Joseph, the Potawatomi tribe ceded some of their reserved lands in southwestern Michigan. The treaty stated that its purpose was "to consolidate some of the dispersed bands of the Potawatamie Tribe in the Territory of Michigan at a point removed from the road leading from Detroit to Chicago, and as far as practicable from the settlements of the Whites". In 1829, McCoy removed to the Thomas station, another mission he had established near the Grand River. The only missionary who remained at Carey was Robert Simerwell. With passage of the Indian Removal Act in 1830, the school at Carey Mission was discontinued. In 1831, McCoy led several of the Potawatomi to a new mission in Kansas.

The modern site consists only of a historical marker placed by the Daughters of the American Revolution, near residential streets named Christiana Drive, Lykins Lane, Isaac McCoy Drive, and Carey Mission Road.

== Reception ==
Carey Mission was called the "point from which the American frontier was extended".

The founding of the Carey Mission was, according to Michigan jurist Nathaniel Bacon, "the pioneer step in the way of settlement". Bacon remarked that in 1822, when the mission was established, the region was considered by European settlers to be dangerous and hostile. Within recent memory were the Battle of Tippecanoe in Indiana and the Battle of Fort Dearborn in Illinois. "Emigration had in a great measure stopped. Very few dared to venture beyond the older settlements, until McCoy boldly entered into the heart of the Indian country, and began his mission school among the Pottawottomies who dwelt on the river St. Joseph. The fact was soon made known throughout Indiana and Ohio, and at once adventurers began to prepare to follow the example of the missionary, who had led the way." Several former students, including John Tecumseh Jones, became leaders in the American West.

== See also ==
- Johnston Lykins, McCoy's second leader, reverend, and medic to the tribes
