= William S. Gregory =

American politician (1825–1887)

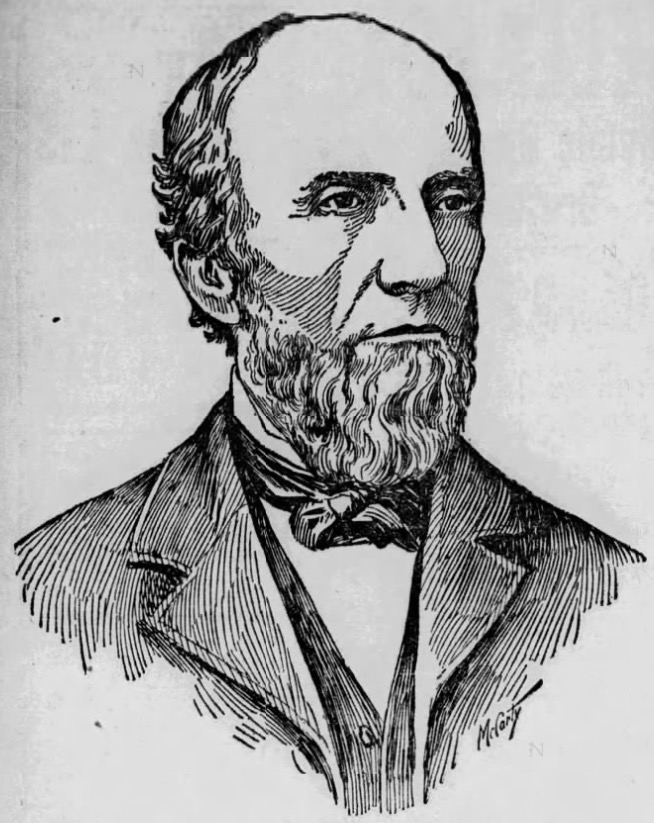

1st mayor of Kansas City
- In office April 18, 1853 – February 1854
- Preceded by: office created
- Succeeded by: Johnston Lykins

Personal details
- Born: William Samuel Gregory; August 4, 1825 Shelby County, Kentucky, US
- Died: August 11, 1887 (aged 62) Kansas City, Missouri, US
- Resting place: Elmwood Cemetery
- Party: Whig
- Spouses: Eliza A. Wade (m. 1846; died 1851) Mary C. Wade (m. 1852)
- Children: 4
- Education: Hanover College
- Occupation: Politician; businessman

William Samuel Gregory (August 4, 1825 – August 11, 1887) was an American politician. He was the first mayor of Kansas City, Missouri, beginning his term on April 18, 1853. He was also the owner of grocery businesses in Missouri and Illinois.

== Early life ==
Gregory was born on August 4, 1825, in Shelby County, Kentucky. His mother was related to Bland Ballard, an early settler of Kentucky. He took a full collegiate course at Hanover College in Indiana.

== Career ==
Gregory moved from Kentucky, with his wife Elizabeth, to Jackson County, Missouri, in August 1844. He bought a farm in Jackson County in 1844, and moved to Kansas City in 1851. Gregory operated a grocery store on the levee. He and other settlers petitioned to incorporate the Town of Kansas.

When Kansas City was incorporated on March 18, 1853, it had an area 0.98 square miles (2.5 km^{2}) and a population of 2,500. 63 votes were cast for mayor and Gregory defeated Benoist Troost by nine votes. Gregory only served 10 months as mayor, when it was discovered that he lived on a farm that was outside the city limits eastern boundary at Locust Street. Therefore, he was not eligible to be mayor. Johnston Lykins finished out his term, beginning in February 1854.

At the outbreak of the Civil War, Gregory commanded a company under Colonel John Reid in Kansas and Western Missouri. He then moved to St. Louis with his family and joined with E. R. Threlkald and L. C. Alexander to form the W. S. Gregory grocery business. After a year, Gregory moved to Chicago and partnered with J. R. Staley and S. C. Bennett. After Staley retired in 1865, the business continued as Bennett & Gregory. In 1857, Gregory moved back to Kansas City and opened a general store. In 1872, Gregory bought out his partner and consolidated with L. H. Warriner and A. C. Dyas, forming the company Gregory, Warriner & Dyas. In 1877, it was reorganized as Gregory & Co.

In 1878, Gregory was a member of the common council of Kansas City. He was a director of the Bank of Kansas City since its organization.

== Personal life ==
Gregory married Eliza A. Wade in January 1846. She died in April 1851. In May 1852, Gregory married the sister of his former wife, Mary C. Wade. He had four children: Mrs. R. H. Cannon, Samuel W., Robert L. and Mrs. F. Holmes.

Gregory died on August 11, 1867, aged 62, in Kansas City. He is buried in Elmwood Cemetery. In the 1930s, 71st Street was renamed Gregory Boulevard in his honor.

Preceded by office created	Mayor of Kansas City, Missouri; 1853–1854	Succeeded by Johnston Lykins
