= Ottawa University =

Baptist university in Ottawa, Kansas, US

- Former name: Roger Williams University
- Motto: Veritas vos liberabit
- Motto in English: The truth will set you free
- Type: Private university
- Established: 1865; 161 years ago
- Religious affiliation: American Baptist Churches USA
- Endowment: $14.3 million (2016)
- Chancellor: William Tsutsui
- President: Bambi Burgard (OUKS); Dennis Tyner (OUAZ); Kevin Maret (OU Professional and Online Campuses)
- Provost: Joann Bangs
- Rector: John Holzhüter
- Students: 3,365 (all campuses, fall 2024)
- Undergraduates: 2,308 (all campuses, fall 2024)
- Postgraduates: 1,057 (all campuses, fall 2024)
- Location: Ottawa, Kansas, United States; 38.602589°N 95.265542°W
- Colors: Main campus: Black and gold Surprise campus: Red and orange
- Nicknames: Braves; Spirit
- Sporting affiliations: Ottawa main campus: NAIA – KCAC; Surprise campus: NAIA – GSAC
- Website: ottawa.edu

Ottawa University (OU) is a private university with its main campus in Ottawa, Kansas, United States. It also has a second residential campus in Surprise, Arizona, and adult campuses in the Kansas City and Milwaukee metropolitan areas, as well as online.

It was founded in 1865 and is affiliated with the Ottawa Tribe of Oklahoma and the American Baptist Churches USA. The residential campus in Ottawa has a student enrollment of more than 875 students, while the OUAZ campus in Surprise has more than 900. In total, Ottawa University serves more than 4,000 students across all of its campuses and online.

== History ==
The origins of Ottawa University date back to the 1860s when Baptist missionaries established the First Baptist Church in the area that would eventually develop into Ottawa. It was predominately occupied by Potawatomi and Odawa peoples. Elsewhere, Kansas Baptists had chartered an institute of higher learning that they were planning to call "Roger Williams University" after Roger Williams, the founder of the First Baptist Church in America. They were seeking an appropriate site.

At the 1860 Baptist State Convention in Atchison, Kansas, Rev. John Tecumseh "Tauy" Jones (Chippewa) made a case for the university to be founded in Ottawa. He proposed that the Baptists work with Native Americans in the area, who might be willing to sell some of their land in order to create a college. Jones was an interpreter and influential among tribal leaders.

After discussions with Native American leaders—who were amenable to the idea— the parties agreed that 20,000 acres of land would be set aside for the express purpose of constructing a college. On August 20, 1862, the first board of trustees (made up of four Native Americans and two white Baptists) met and decided to purchase 5,000 acres of the aforementioned land so as to establish a campus. In 1865, the board decommissioned the name "Roger Williams University" and adopted "Ottawa University" to replace it. Eventually, the campus was whittled to about 640 acres.

Rev. Isaac Smith Kalloch, a Baptist minister from New England, served as the first president from 1866 to 1868. He oversaw the construction of Tauy Jones Hall, which is the oldest surviving building on campus.

== Campuses ==
The original campus, founded in 1865, is in Ottawa, Kansas. It is referred to as OU.

A second residential campus opened in 2017 in Surprise, Arizona, and is referred to as OUAZ.

In addition to the residential locations, OU has adult campuses in Overland Park, Kansas; and Brookfield, Wisconsin, as well as online.

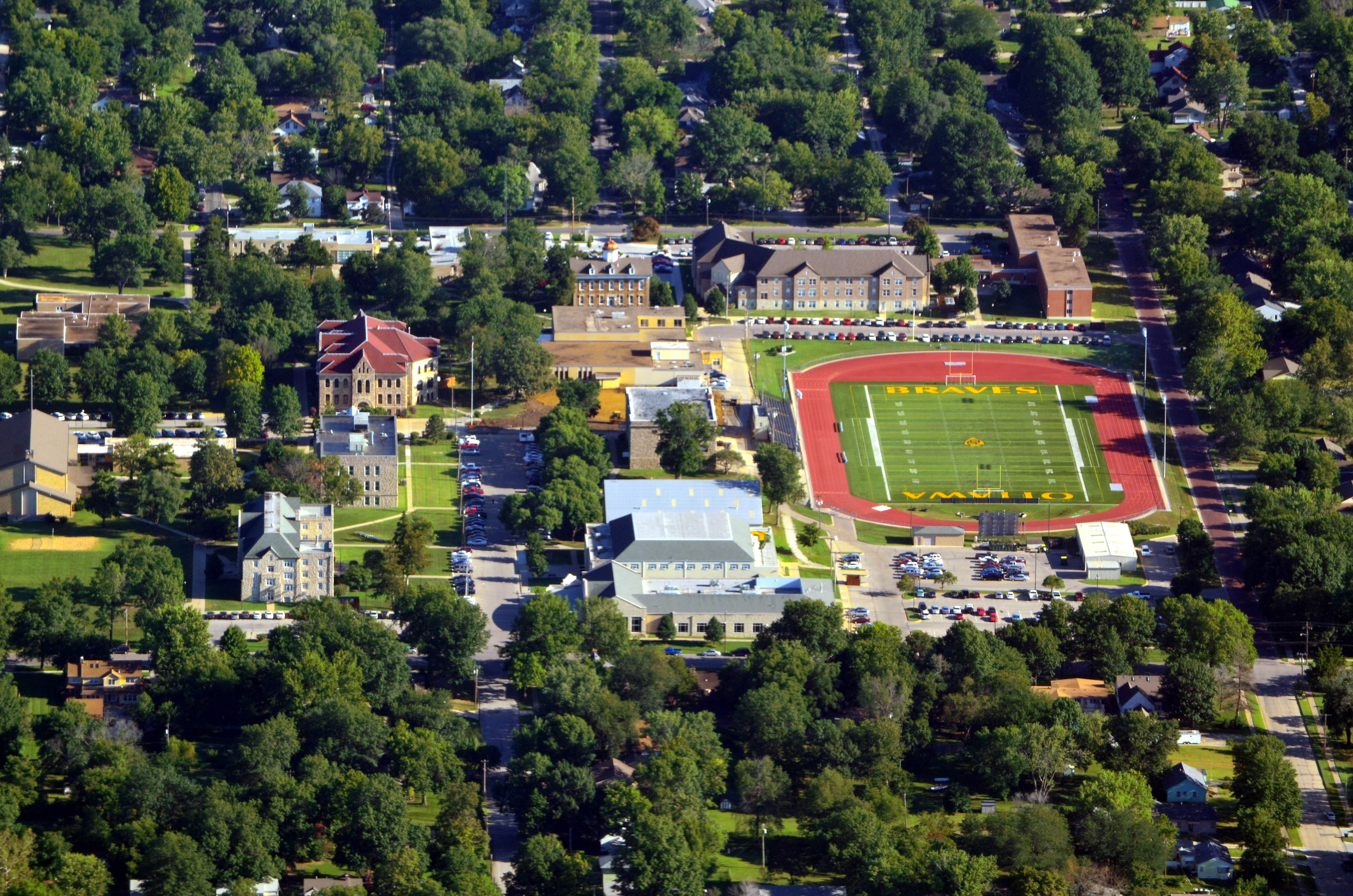
Aerial view of the Ottawa campus

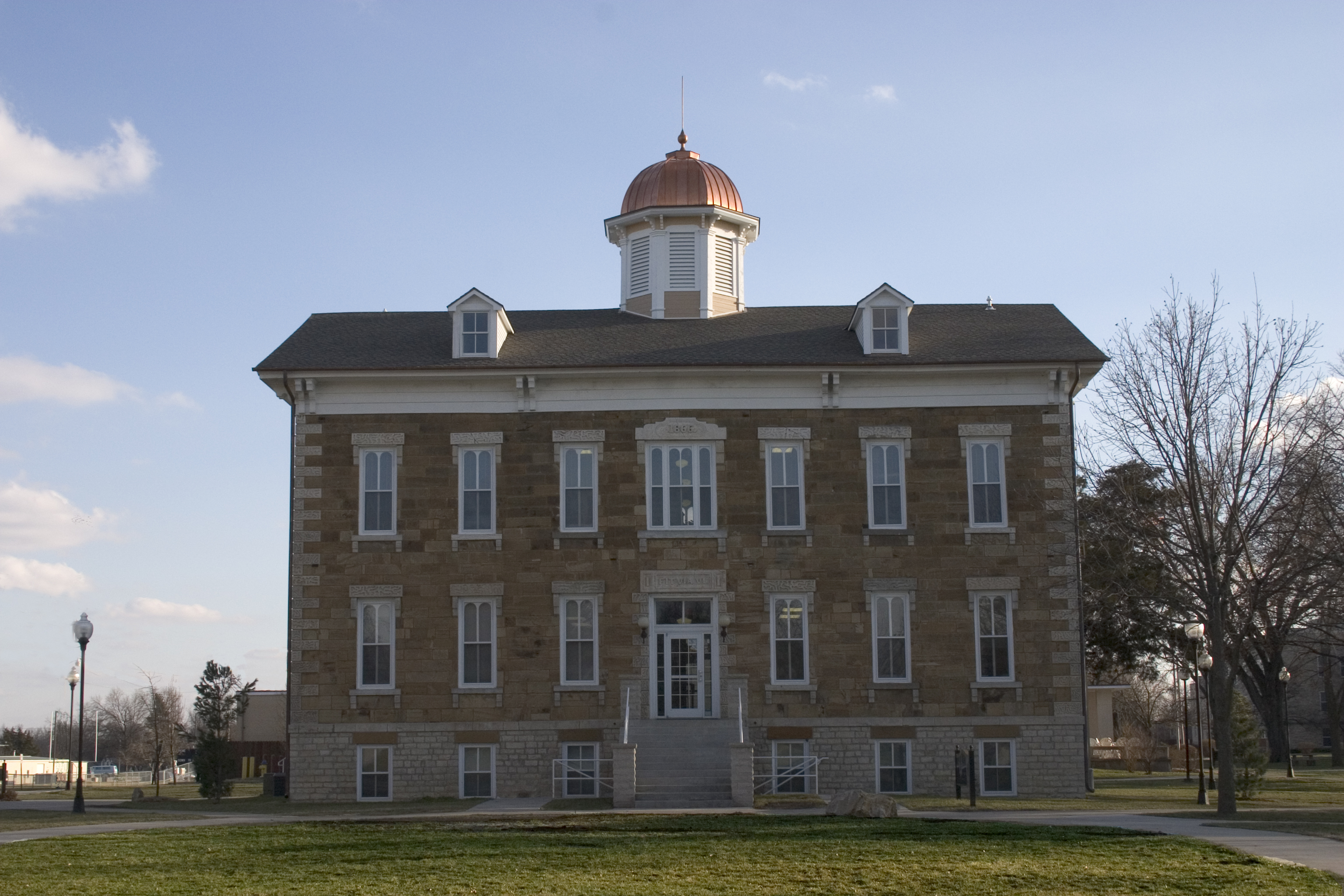
Tauy Jones Hall (1869) is Ottawa's oldest building

== Affiliation ==
It is affiliated with the American Baptist Churches USA.

Ottawa University is accredited by the Higher Learning Commission. Its education programs in Kansas are accredited by the National Council for the Accreditation of Teacher Education and approved by the Kansas State Department of Education.

== Academics ==
Ottawa University offers bachelor's degree programs in more than 25 disciplines. Current graduate program offerings include Doctor of Business Administration (DBA), Master of Accountancy, Master of Business Administration (MBA), Master of Arts in Education (MAEd), Master of Arts in Human Resources (MAHR), Master of Arts in Counseling (MAC), Master of Arts in Leadership, Master of Science in Addiction Counseling, and Master of Science in Nursing (MSN).

== Research and cultural resources ==
The music department holds a number of concerts throughout the year, both on campus and in local venues, that are free and open to the Ottawa, Kansas, and surrounding communities. The theatre department offers a variety of productions for the community. The University serves as a host for community-related events throughout the year.

Ottawa University is the Alpha chapter of Pi Kappa Delta, the national speech and debate honorary. In 1913, Ottawa became the founding member. It continues to invest in forensic activities over 100 years later.

== Athletics ==
=== Ottawa Braves ===
The athletic teams of the Kansas (main) campus are called the Braves. The university is a member of the National Association of Intercollegiate Athletics (NAIA), primarily competing in the Kansas Collegiate Athletic Conference (KCAC) since the 1982–83 academic year. Previously they had been a member in that conference from charter member days: 1902–03 to 1970–71. The Braves also previously competed as a founding member of the Heart of America Athletic Conference (HAAC) from its inception in 1971–72 to 1981–82.

Ottawa competes in 33 intercollegiate varsity athletic teams: Men's sports include baseball, basketball, bowling, cross country, football, golf, lacrosse, powerlifting, soccer, tennis, track & field, volleyball and wrestling; while women's sports include basketball, beach volleyball, bowling, cross country, flag football, golf, lacrosse, powerlifting, soccer, softball, stunt, tennis, track & field, volleyball and wrestling. Co-ed sports include competitive cheer, competitive dance, and eSports. OU also offers varied intramural programs.

=== Ottawa (AZ) Spirit ===
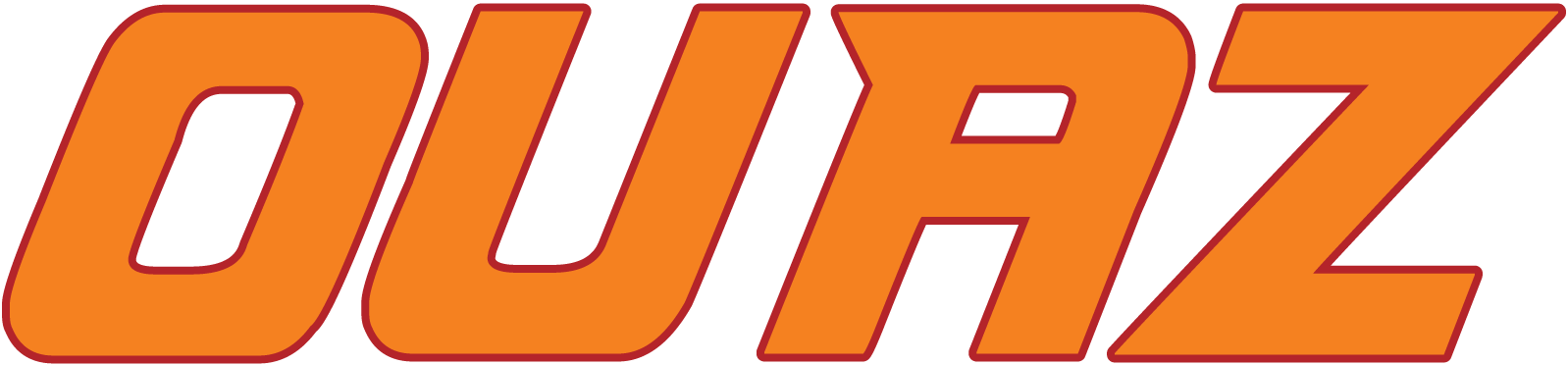
OUAZ athletics wordmark

The athletic teams of the Arizona (OUAZ) campus are called the Spirit. The campus is a member of the National Association of Intercollegiate Athletics (NAIA), primarily competing in the Great Southwest Athletic Conference (GSAC) since the 2018–19 academic year; while its football team competes in the Sooner Athletic Conference (SAC) since the 2018 fall season. They are also a member of the National Christian College Athletic Association (NCCAA), primarily competing as an independent in the West Region of the Division I level.

OUAZ competes in 27 intercollegiate varsity sports. Men's sports include baseball, basketball, cross country, football, golf, soccer, swimming & diving, tennis, track & field, volleyball, water polo and weightlifting; women's sports include basketball, beach volleyball, cross country, golf, soccer, softball, stunt, swimming & diving, tennis, track & field, volleyball, water polo and weightlifting; and co-ed sports include competitive cheer and competitive dance.

== Student life ==
The campus in Ottawa, Kansas, offers more than 30 student groups, clubs and organizations, including the oldest student-run newspaper in Kansas, The Campus. The school offers drama, music, fraternities and sororities, honor societies, campus ministry opportunities, and other activities.

The campus in Surprise offers esports, theatre, club team wrestling, leadership, and student government. Students are able and encouraged to establish other clubs and organizations to expand the student experience on campus.

== Notable alumni ==
- Wayne Angell, former Federal Reserve governor, Kansas State Representative and Bear Stearns chief economist
- Mitch Barnhart, Athletic Director, University of Kentucky
- Leonard Erickson, researcher of DNA repair
- Howard K. Gloyd, herpetologist, credited with describing several new species of reptiles
- Robin Harris, comedian
- Marvin Harvey, basketball coach
- Timon Marshall, Arena Football League player
- Merritt C. Mechem, territorial Supreme Court justice and one-term Republican governor of New Mexico
- John Sherman, owner of the Kansas City Royals
- Dorothy C. Stratton, director of the United States Coast Guard Women's Reserve (SPARS) during World War II
- DeDe Dorsey, National Football League (Indianapolis Colts (2006-Super Bowl XLI Champions) and Detroit Lions)
- Derrick Ward, National Football League (played football for Ottawa University for one semester, but did not graduate from this institution)
- Mary Watson Weaver, composer
