= Tauy Jones Hall =

- U.S. National Register of Historic Places
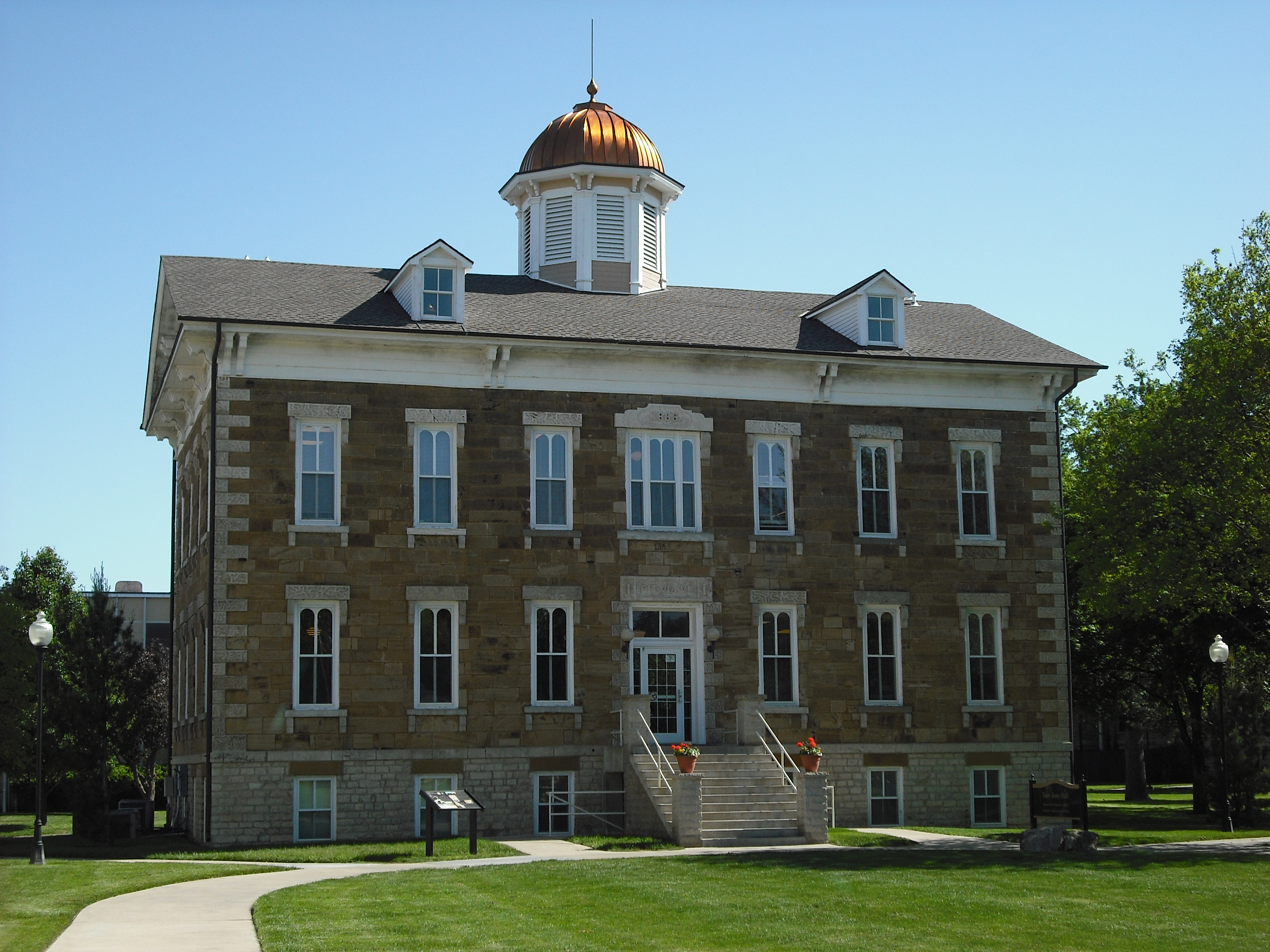
- Tauy Jones Hall in 2009

- Location within Kansas
- Location: Ottawa University campus, 10th and Cedar Sts., Ottawa, Kansas
- Coordinates: 38°36′14″N 95°15′47″W
- Area: Less than one acre
- Built: 1866
- Built by: Emerson & Plank
- NRHP reference No.: 82002659
- Added to NRHP: June 14, 1982

Tauy Jones Hall is the oldest surviving building on the Ottawa University campus at 10th and Cedar Streets in Ottawa, Kansas, and has a copper roofed cupola at its peak. The building was named after John Tecumseh "Tauy" Jones, who was of half Chippewa heritage and served as an interpreter for the Pottawatomie.

Emerson & Plank began construction of the building in 1866 under President Isaac Smith Kalloch. Construction was completed in 1869. The building was added to the National Register of Historic Places on June 14, 1982. Tauy Jones Hall is currently home to "the Chancellor's Office, Human Resources Department, Finance Department, Marketing Department, and the Office of University Advancement."
