= Jotham Meeker =

American linguist

Jotham Meeker (Hamilton County, Ohio, November 8, 1804—January 12, 1855) was a Baptist missionary, printer, who lived and proselytized among various Native American peoples, including the Delaware, Ottawa, and Shawnee. He was born near Cincinnati, Ohio, and at the age of 21 became a teacher of the Indians, first at Carey Station, headed by Isaac McCoy. near present-day Niles, Michigan, November, 1825. Also joining the Station was 17-year-old Eleanor Richardson, who later became Jotham's wife.

Meeker and Richardson moved to Thomas Station at the rapids of the Grand River in 1827. The site is now in Grand Rapids, Michigan. The Ottawas were led by Chief Noonday (who had fought with the British alongside Tecumseh in the War of 1812. Jotham and Eleanor were married in 1830. As white settlers pressed in, the Indians moved north to the Upper Peninsula of Michigan at Sault Ste. Marie and the Meekers went with them. But, the mission was temporary as the Indian Removal Act of 1830 promulgated by President Andrew Jackson required all Indians to move west of the Mississippi River. Some of the Michigan Indians escaped to Canada and others were joined by Ottawas of Ohio in Indian Territory, in what became Kansas. Jotham and Eleanor went with them arriving in northeast Kansas in fall 1833.

In 1834 the Meekers installed a printing press at Shawnee Baptist Mission in present Johnson County, Kansas and in 1837 established a mission near present-day Ottawa, Kansas where for 18 years he ministered to the needs of the Ottawa Indians who lived there. They endured floods, prairie fires, cholera and malaria to serve the Indians for more than 20 years. Their daughter, Maria, was the first white child born in Kansas.

Meeker was an early advocate of printing native languages and developed an orthography enabling use of standard types; he printed over sixty publications in nearly a dozen languages, including the Shawnee Sun in the Indian language (Siwinowe Kesibwi) with contributions by Blackfeather and John Tecumseh Jones of Ottawa.

Jotham died January 12, 1855, and was buried in the Ottawa Cemetery as was Eleanor who died a year later. The grave was near those of Indian Chiefs Comchau and Notinno.
