= List of elections in 1892 =

The following elections occurred in the year 1892.

== Asia ==
=== Japan ===
- 1892 Japanese general election

== Europe ==
=== Denmark ===
- 1892 Danish Folketing election

=== Portugal ===
- 1892 Portuguese legislative election

=== United Kingdom ===
- 1892 Chertsey by-election
- 1892 Derby by-election
- 1892 East Belfast by-election
- 1892 Hackney North by-election
- 1892 Kirkcaldy Burghs by-election
- 1892 Liverpool Everton by-election
- 1892 Mid Armagh by-election
- 1892 Rossendale by-election
- 1892 South Wexford by-election
- 1892 United Kingdom general election
- 1892 United Kingdom general election in Ireland
- 1892 United Kingdom general election in Scotland
- 1892 United Kingdom local elections

== North America ==
=== Canada ===
- 1892 Edmonton municipal election
- 1892 Manitoba general election
- 1892 New Brunswick general election
- 1892 Quebec general election

=== United States ===
- 1892 United States elections
- 1892 United States presidential election
- 1892 New York state election

==== United States Senate ====
- 1892 and 1893 United States Senate elections

==== United States House of Representatives ====
- 1892 United States House of Representatives elections
- 1892 United States House of Representatives elections in Alabama
- 1892 United States House of Representatives election in Arizona Territory
- 1892 United States House of Representatives elections in Arkansas
- 1892 United States House of Representatives elections in California
- 1892 California's 3rd congressional district special election
- 1892 United States House of Representatives elections in Colorado
- 1892 United States House of Representatives elections in Connecticut
- 1892 United States House of Representatives election in Delaware
- 1892 United States House of Representatives elections in Florida
- 1892 United States House of Representatives elections in Georgia
- 1892 United States House of Representatives election in Idaho
- 1892 United States House of Representatives elections in Illinois
- 1892 United States House of Representatives elections in Indiana
- 1892 United States House of Representatives elections in Iowa
- 1892 United States House of Representatives elections in Kansas
- 1892 United States House of Representatives elections in Kentucky
- 1892 United States House of Representatives elections in Louisiana
- 1892 United States House of Representatives elections in Maine
- 1892 United States House of Representatives elections in Maryland
- 1892 Maryland's 1st congressional district special election
- 1892 United States House of Representatives elections in Massachusetts
- 1892 United States House of Representatives elections in Michigan
- 1892 United States House of Representatives elections in Minnesota
- 1892 United States House of Representatives elections in Mississippi
- 1892 United States House of Representatives elections in Missouri
- 1892 United States House of Representatives election in Montana
- 1892 United States House of Representatives elections in Nebraska
- 1892 United States House of Representatives election in Nevada
- 1892 United States House of Representatives elections in New Hampshire
- 1892 United States House of Representatives elections in New Jersey
- 1892 United States House of Representatives election in New Mexico Territory
- 1892 United States House of Representatives elections in New York
- 1892 United States House of Representatives elections in North Carolina
- 1892 United States House of Representatives election in North Dakota
- 1892 United States House of Representatives elections in Ohio
- 1892 Ohio's 16th congressional district special election
- 1892 United States House of Representatives election in Oklahoma Territory
- 1892 United States House of Representatives elections in Oregon
- 1892 United States House of Representatives elections in Pennsylvania
- 1892 United States House of Representatives elections in Rhode Island
- 1892 United States House of Representatives elections in South Carolina
- 1892 South Carolina's 6th congressional district special election
- 1892 United States House of Representatives election in South Dakota
- 1892 United States House of Representatives elections in Tennessee
- 1892 United States House of Representatives elections in Texas
- 1892 Texas's 9th congressional district special election
- 1892 United States House of Representatives elections in Vermont
- 1892 United States House of Representatives elections in Virginia
- 1892 United States House of Representatives election in Washington
- 1892 United States House of Representatives elections in West Virginia
- 1892 United States House of Representatives elections in Wisconsin
- 1892 United States House of Representatives election in Wyoming

==== United States lieutenant gubernatorial ====
- 1892 Connecticut lieutenant gubernatorial election
- 1892 Illinois lieutenant gubernatorial election
- 1892 Minnesota lieutenant gubernatorial election
- 1892 Missouri lieutenant gubernatorial election
- 1892 Nebraska lieutenant gubernatorial election
- 1892 Texas lieutenant gubernatorial election
- 1892 Wisconsin lieutenant gubernatorial election

==== United States gubernatorial ====
- 1892 Alabama gubernatorial election
- 1892 Arkansas gubernatorial election
- 1892 Colorado gubernatorial election
- 1892 Connecticut gubernatorial election
- 1892 Florida gubernatorial election
- 1892 Georgia gubernatorial election
- 1892 Idaho gubernatorial election
- 1892 Illinois gubernatorial election
- 1892 Indiana gubernatorial election
- 1892 Kansas gubernatorial election
- 1892 Louisiana gubernatorial election
- 1892 Maine gubernatorial election
- 1892 Massachusetts gubernatorial election
- 1892 Michigan gubernatorial election
- 1892 Minnesota gubernatorial election
- 1892 Missouri gubernatorial election
- 1892 Montana gubernatorial election
- 1892 Nebraska gubernatorial election
- 1892 New Hampshire gubernatorial election
- 1892 New Jersey gubernatorial election
- 1892 North Carolina gubernatorial election
- 1892 North Dakota gubernatorial election
- 1892 Rhode Island gubernatorial election
- 1892 South Carolina gubernatorial election
- 1892 South Dakota gubernatorial election
- 1892 Tennessee gubernatorial election
- 1892 Texas gubernatorial election
- 1892 United States gubernatorial elections
- 1892 Vermont gubernatorial election
- 1892 Washington gubernatorial election
- 1892 West Virginia gubernatorial election
- 1892 Wisconsin gubernatorial election
- 1892 Wyoming gubernatorial special election

==== United States mayoral elections ====
- 1892 Boston mayoral election
- 1892 Manchester, New Hampshire, mayoral election
- 1892 New York City mayoral election

== Oceania ==
=== Australia ===
- 1892 East Adelaide colonial by-election
- 1892 Perth colonial by-election

=== New Zealand ===
- 1892 Bruce by-election
- 1892 City of Wellington by-election
- 1892 Rangitikei by-election

== South America ==
- 1892 Argentine presidential election
- 1891–92 Colombian presidential election
- 1892 Ecuadorian presidential election

== See also ==
- Category:1892 elections
