= 1892 United States gubernatorial elections =

- November 8, 1892 (Note: Alabama, Arkansas, Florida, Georgia, Louisiana, Maine, Rhode Island and Vermont held early elections.)

32 governorships (Note: Including a a special election in Wyoming.)
	Majority party	Minority party
Party	Democratic	Republican
Seats before	26 (Note: John Milton Thayer (R) had succeeded Nebraska Governor James E. Boyd (D) who was removed from office by the Nebraska Supreme Court in May 1891. Boyd's citizenship was upheld by the U.S. Supreme Court and he was restored to office in February 1892.)	18
Seats after	27	14
Seat change	▲1	▼4
Seats up	17	15
Seats won	18	11
	Third party
Party	Populist
Seats before	0
Seats after	3
Seat change	▲3
Seats up	0
Seats won	3
- Democratic gain Democratic hold Republican gain Republican hold Populist gain

United States gubernatorial elections were held in 1892, in 32 states, concurrent with the House, Senate elections and presidential election, on November 8, 1892 (except in Alabama, Arkansas, Florida, Georgia, Louisiana, Maine, Rhode Island and Vermont, which held early elections).

In Florida, the gubernatorial election was held in October for the first time, having previously been held on the same day as federal elections.

== Results ==
State	Incumbent	Party	Status	Opposing candidates
Alabama (held, 1 August 1892)	Thomas G. Jones	Democratic	Re-elected, 52.24%	Reuben F. Kolb (Independent Democrat) 47.53% Scattering 0.23%
Arkansas (held, 5 September 1892)	James Philip Eagle	Democratic	Retired, Democratic victory	William Meade Fishback (Democratic) 57.70% William G. Whipple (Republican) 21.53% Jacob P. Carnahan (Populist) 19.92% William J. Nelson (Prohibition) 0.84%
Colorado	John Long Routt	Republican	Retired, Populist victory	Davis Hanson Waite (Populist) (Note: Waite ran under a fusion ticket between the Populists and the Silver Democrat Party.) 47.19% Joseph Helm (Republican) 41.39% Joseph H. Maupin (Democratic) 9.54% John Hipp (Prohibition) 1.88%
Connecticut	Morgan Bulkeley	Republican	Retired, Democratic victory	Luzon B. Morris (Democratic) 50.31% Samuel E. Merwin (Republican) 46.64% E. P. Angin (Prohibition) 2.39% E. M. Ripley (Populist) 0.47% Moritz E. Ruther (Socialist Labor) 0.19%
Florida (held, 4 October 1892)	Francis P. Fleming	Democratic	Term-limited, Democratic victory	Henry L. Mitchell (Democratic) 78.70% Alonzo P. Baskin (Populist) 20.56% N. J. Hawley (Prohibition) 0.74%
Georgia (held, 5 October 1892)	William J. Northen	Democratic	Re-elected, 67.07%	W. L. Peck (Populist) 32.93%
Idaho	N. B. Willey (acting)	Republican	Defeated for renomination, Republican victory	William J. McConnell (Republican) 40.74% John M. Burke (Democratic) 33.72% Abraham J. Crook (Populist) 24.23% J. A. Clark (Prohibition) 1.32%
Illinois	Joseph W. Fifer	Republican	Defeated, 46.12%	John Peter Altgeld (Democratic) 48.74% Robert R. Link (Prohibition) 2.84% Nathan M. Barnett (Populist) 2.30%
Indiana	Ira Joy Chase (acting)	Republican	Defeated, 46.18%	Claude Matthews (Democratic) 47.45% Leroy Templeton (Populist) 4.01% Aaron Worth (Prohibition) 2.36%
Kansas	Lyman U. Humphrey	Republican	Retired to run for U.S. House, Populist victory	Lorenzo D. Lewelling (Populist) (Note: Lewelling ran under a fusion ticket between the Democrats and the Populist Party.) 50.19% Abram W. Smith (Republican) 48.52% I. O. Pickering (Prohibition) 1.28%
Louisiana' (held, 19 April 1892)	Francis T. Nicholls	Democratic	[data missing], Anti-Lottery Democrat victory	Murphy J. Foster (Anti-Lottery Democrat) 44.59% Samuel D. McEnery (Democratic) 26.42% Albert H. Leonard (Republican) 16.55% John E. Breaux (Independent Republican) 6.94% R. H. Tannehill (Populist) 5.50%
Maine (held, 12 September 1892)	Edwin C. Burleigh	Republican	Retired, Republican victory	Henry B. Cleaves (Republican) 52.12% Charles F. Johnson (Democratic) 42.51% Timothy B. Hussey (Prohibition) 2.97% Luther C. Bateman (Populist) 2.22% Edgar F. Knowlton (Union Labor) 0.15% Scattering 0.03%
Massachusetts	William E. Russell	Democratic	Re-elected, 49.03%	William H. Haile (Republican) 48.36% Wolcott Hamlin (Prohibition) 1.86% Henry Winn (Populist) 0.52% Squire E. Putney (Socialist Labor) 0.23%
Michigan	Edwin B. Winans	Democratic	Retired, Republican victory	John T. Rich (Republican) 47.21% Allen Benton Morse (Democratic) 43.77% John W. Ewing (Populist) 4.57% John Russell (Prohibition) 4.43% Scattering 0.02%
Minnesota	William Rush Merriam	Republican	Retired, Republican victory	Knute Nelson (Republican) 42.68% Daniel W. Lawler (Democratic) 36.96% Ignatius L. Donnelly (Populist) 15.58% William J. Dean (Prohibition) 4.78%
Missouri	David R. Francis	Democratic	Term-limited, Democratic victory	William J. Stone (Democratic) 48.98% William Warner (Republican) 43.50% Leverett Leonard (Populist) 6.89% John Sobieski (Prohibition) 0.63%
Montana	Joseph Toole	Democratic	Retired, Republican victory	John E. Rickards (Republican) 41.17% Timothy E. Collins (Democratic) 39.96% William Kennedy (Populist) 17.64% J. M. Waters (Prohibition) 1.23%
Nebraska	James E. Boyd	Democratic	Retired, Republican victory	Lorenzo Crounse (Republican) 39.71% Charles Van Wyck (Populist) 34.75% Julius Sterling Morton (Democratic) 22.38% Charles Eugene Bentley (Prohibition) 3.16%
New Hampshire	Hiram A. Tuttle	Republican	Retired, Republican victory	John Butler Smith (Republican) 50.17% Luther F. McKinney (Democratic) 47.67% Edgar L. Carr (Prohibition) 1.80% William O. Noyes (Populist) 0.37%
New Jersey	Leon Abbett	Democratic	Term-limited, Democratic victory	George Theodore Werts (Democratic) 49.65% John Kean Jr. (Republican) 47.39% Thomas J. Kennedy (Prohibition) 2.30% George B. Keim (Socialist Labor) 0.40% Benjamin Bird (Populist) 0.27%
North Carolina	Thomas Michael Holt (acting)	Democratic	Defeated for renomination, Democratic victory	Elias Carr (Democratic) 48.31% David M. Furches (Republican) 33.75% Wyatt P. Exum (Populist) 17.05% James M. Templeton (Prohibition) 0.88%
North Dakota	Andrew H. Burke	Republican	Defeated, 47.57%	Eli C. D. Shortridge (Populist) (Note: Shortridge ran under a fusion ticket between the Democrats and the Populist Party.) 52.43%
Rhode Island (held, 6 April 1892)	Herbert W. Ladd	Republican	Retired, Republican victory	Daniel Russell Brown (Republican) 50.22% William T. C. Wardwell (Democratic) 46.51% Alexander Gilbert (Prohibition) 2.92% Franklin E. Burton (Populist) 0.34%
South Carolina	Benjamin Ryan Tillman	Democratic	Re-elected, 99.90%	Scattering 0.10%
South Dakota	Arthur C. Mellette	Republican	Retired, Republican victory	Charles H. Sheldon (Republican) 47.46% A. L. Van Osdel (Independent) 31.99% Peter Couchman (Democratic) 20.55%
Tennessee	John P. Buchanan	Democratic	Defeated as a Populist, 11.94%	Peter Turney (Democratic) 47.86% George W. Winstead (Republican) 38.14% Edward H. East (Prohibition) 2.06%
Texas	Jim Hogg	Democratic	Re-elected, 43.74%	George Clark (Independent Democrat) 30.63% Thomas L. Nugent (Populist) 24.91% D. M. Prendergast (Prohibition) 0.37% Andrew Jackson Houston (Lily-White Republican) 0.30% Scattering 0.04%
Vermont (held, 6 September 1892)	Carroll S. Page	Republican	Retired, Republican victory	Levi K. Fuller (Republican) 64.99% Bradley B. Smalley (Democratic) 32.09% Edward L. Allen (Prohibition) 2.55% Scattering 0.37%
Washington	Elisha P. Ferry	Republican	Retired, Republican victory	John McGraw (Republican) 37.01% Henry J. Snively (Democratic) 32.20% Cyrus W. Young (Populist) 26.41% Roger Sherman Greene (Prohibition) 4.38%
West Virginia	Aretas B. Fleming	Democratic	Term-limited, Democratic victory	William A. MacCorkle (Democratic) 49.37% Thomas E. Davis (Republican) 47.08% James Bassett (Populist) 2.36% Frank Burt (Prohibition) 1.19%
Wisconsin	George W. Peck	Democratic	Re-elected, 47.93%	John Coit Spooner (Republican) 45.89% Thomas C. Richmond (Prohibition) 3.55% Cyrus M. Butt (Populist) 2.59% Scattering 0.04%
Wyoming (special election)	Amos W. Barber (acting)	Republican	Retired, Democratic victory	John Eugene Osborne (Democratic) 53.95% Edward Ivinson (Republican) 43.61% William Brown (Prohibition) 2.44%

== See also ==
- 1892 United States elections

== Bibliography ==
- Glashan, Roy R. (1979). American Governors and Gubernatorial Elections, 1775-1978. Meckler Books. ISBN 0-930466-17-9.
- Gubernatorial Elections, 1787-1997. Washington, D.C.: Congressional Quarterly Inc. 1998. ISBN 1-56802-396-0.
- Dubin, Michael J. (2014). United States Gubernatorial Elections, 1861-1911: The Official Results by State and County. Jefferson, North Carolina: McFarland. ISBN 978-0-7864-4722-0.
- The World Almanac, 1893. New York, NY: The Press Publishing Co. 1893.
- McPherson, Edward, ed. (1893). The Tribune Almanac and Political Register, 1893. New York, NY: The Tribune Association.
- J. A. Piper, Secretary of State (1895). Roster of Soldiers, Sailors and Marines of the War of 1812, the Mexican War, and the War of the Rebellion, Residing in Nebraska, June 1, 1895. York, Nebraska: Nebraska Newspaper Union. p. 128.
