= Old Town Main Post Office =

- US Post Office-Old Town Main
- U.S. National Register of Historic Places
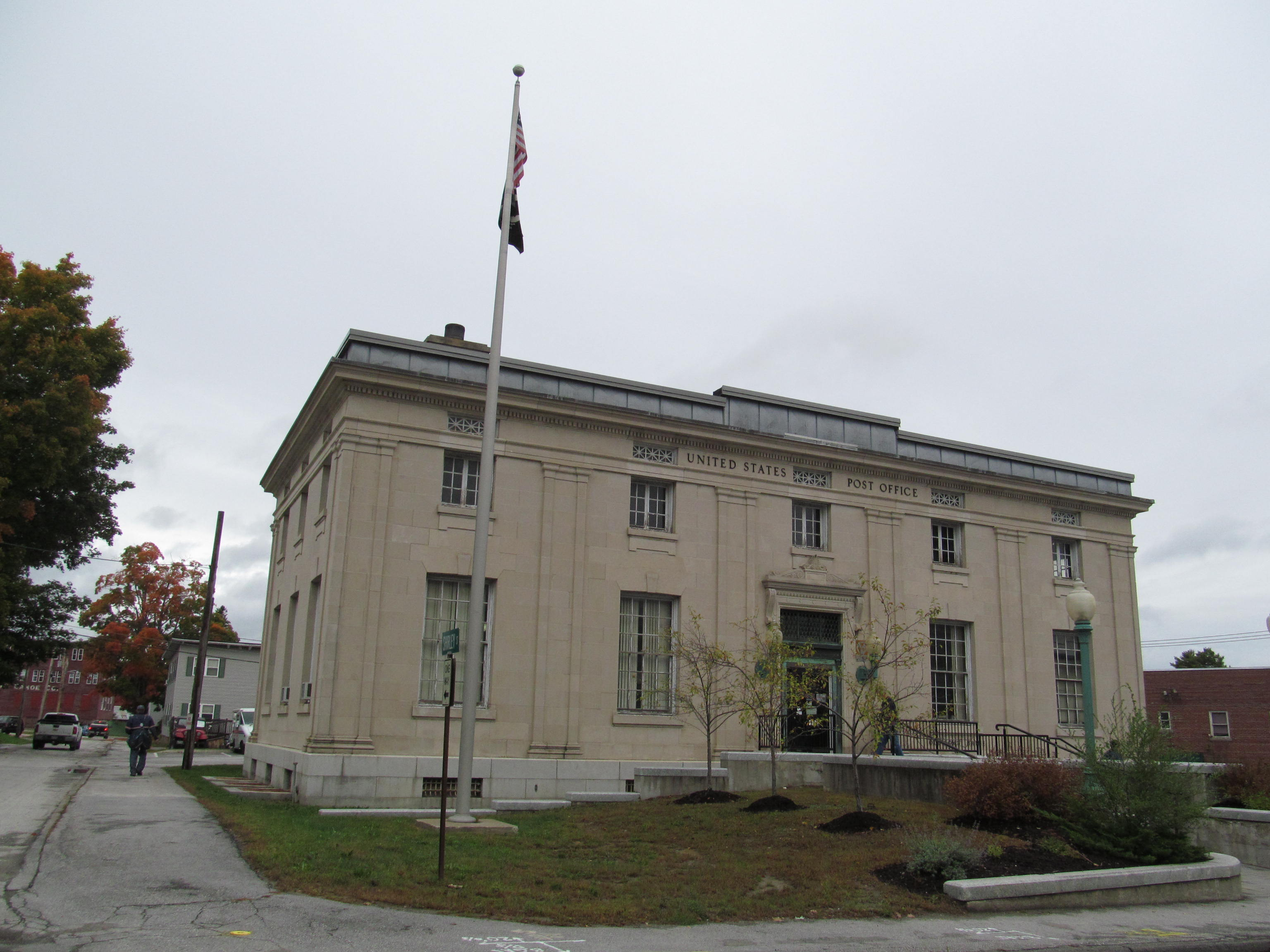

- Location within Maine Location within the United States
- Location: 141 Center St., Old Town, Maine
- Coordinates: 44°56′5″N 68°38′48″W
- Area: 0.5 acres (0.20 ha)
- Built: 1912
- Architect: Office of the Supervising Architect under Oscar Wenderoth
- Architectural style: Classical Revival
- NRHP reference No.: 86002958
- Added to NRHP: September 25, 1986

The Old Town Main Post Office is located at 141 Center Street in Old Town, Maine. The Classical Revival building was an early design of the Office of the Supervising Architect under Oscar Wenderoth. Its design was completed in 1912 and construction in 1914 under the provisions of the Tarsney Act. It was listed on the National Register of Historic Places in 1986.

== Description and history ==
The Old Town Main Post Office is set on the north side of Center Street, at its junction with Shirley Street, just off Main Street. It is a two-story structure, built out of dressed stone, with a flat roof and a main facade with Classical proportions. It is divided into five bays separated by engaged paneled columns. The outer bays each have tall sash windows recessed in rectangular openings with keystones at the top and a projecting sill at the bottom. Second-floor windows are roughly square, and also have a projecting sill. Above them is a band of fretwork, above which is an entablature in which small diamond-grilled windows are set, and a projecting cornice above. The entrance is recessed in an elaborately carved architrave. The interior of the main lobby has terrazzo marble flooring, marble wainscoting, wooden trim, and transoms above the service counter and mailboxes.

The building has undergone restoration.

== See also ==
- National Register of Historic Places listings in Penobscot County, Maine
- List of United States post offices
