= 1892 Missouri Secretary of State election =

- November 8, 1892

Nominee	Alexander A. Lesueur	Henry T. Alkire	David B. Page
Party	Democratic	Republican	Populist
Popular vote	268,057	228,296	40,818
Percentage	49.53%	42.18%	7.54%
Secretary of State before election
Alexander A. Lesueur
Democratic
Elected Secretary of State
Alexander A. Lesueur
Democratic

The 1892 Missouri Secretary of State election was held on November 8, 1892, in order to elect the secretary of state of Missouri. Democratic nominee and incumbent secretary of state Alexander A. Lesueur defeated Republican nominee Henry T. Alkire, People's nominee David B. Page and Prohibition nominee Edwin E. McClellan.

== General election ==
On election day, November 8, 1892, Democratic nominee Alexander A. Lesueur won re-election by a margin of 39,761 votes against his foremost opponent Republican nominee Henry T. Alkire, thereby retaining Democratic control over the office of secretary of state. Lesueur was sworn in for his second term on January 9, 1893.

=== Results ===
Missouri Secretary of State election, 1892
Party	Candidate	Votes	%
Democratic	Alexander A. Lesueur (incumbent)	268,057	49.53
Republican	Henry T. Alkire	228,296	42.18
Populist	David B. Page	40,818	7.54
Prohibition	Edwin E. McClellan	4,046	0.75
Total votes		541,217	100.00
Democratic hold			

== See also ==
- 1892 Missouri gubernatorial election
