= Martin City, Missouri =

Martin City
- Martin City, Kansas City, Missouri
- 2013 St. Patrick's Day Parade in Martin City outside Jess & Jim's
- Nickname: Martin City, Missouri
- Location within Missouri
- Coordinates: 38.881703°N 94.599263°W
- Country: United States
- State: Missouri
- Counties: Jackson

Area
  - Total: 1.965 sq mi (5.09 km^{2})
  - Land: 1.965 sq mi (5.09 km^{2})
  - Water: 0.0 sq mi (0 km^{2})
- Elevation: 892 ft (272 m)

Population (2010)
  - Total: 686
  - Density: 349/sq mi (135/km^{2})
- Time zone: UTC-6 (Central (CST))
  - Summer (DST): UTC-5 (CST)
- ZIP code: 64145

Martin City is a neighborhood of Kansas City, Missouri located along the Missouri and Kansas border in Jackson County in the Kansas City metropolitan area. It was once an unincorporated town, and was annexed by the City of Kansas City in 1963. The Martin City neighborhood is generally defined as being east of the Kansas state line, and south of Blue Ridge Boulevard in areas west and north of the Blue River.

== History ==
The town of Martin City, Missouri, was located in the vicinity of 135th and Holmes Streets in what became Kansas City, Missouri and was originally named Tilden. It was platted January 4, 1887 by E.L. Martin and John H. Lipscomb. The town of Tilden was named for Samuel Jones Tilden, a presidential candidate who was defeated by Rutherford B. Hayes in 1876 (he lost by one electoral vote). In 1895, due to the existence of another town named Tilden, Missouri in Dallas County, the town was renamed to Martin City.

The name Martin City came from Edward Lowe Martin who organized the Kansas City Distilling Company and E.L. Martin & Co. wholesale liquor. Mr. Martin was Mayor of Kansas City, Missouri in 1873 and served on the Board of Education from 1875 to 1896. He was also a partner with Arthur Stilwell in the Kansas City, Pittsburgh & Gulf railroad, which became Kansas City Southern Railway.

In the early 1900s, Martin City had a train depot on the Missouri Pacific Railroad line, a hotel, a blacksmith shop, and a general store to serve local residents. In 1911, a bank opened to accommodate townspeople and similar to many banking services that declined during the Depression, the Martin City bank closed in 1933. Martin City was full of activity in the roaring 1920s; during Prohibition, one resident recalled that there was drugstore in Martin City where customers could "get a little nip" at a window in back of the store. The dry goods store had a dance hall upstairs where children and adults could roller-skate.

In May 1957 a tornado destroyed much of the area. However, the community rebuilt and in subsequent years many of its small town businesses became regional destinations for the metropolitan area. In 1963 the area was annexed by the City of Kansas City, Missouri. The 1963 annexation included all of the area south of Longview Road to the Cass County line on either side of Grandview, Missouri.

== Demographics ==
As of the census of 2010, there were 686 people, 301 households, and 374 families residing in the neighborhood. The population density was 349 people per square mile (135 people/km^{2}). There were 574 housing units. The racial makeup of the neighborhood was 52.2% White, 32.2% African American, 20.0% Native American, 0.30% Asian, 0.00% Pacific Islander, 0.00% from other races, and 0.56% from two or more races. Hispanic or Latino of any race were 0.10% of the population. The average household size was 2.2 and the average family size was 3.6.

The median income for a household in the neighborhood was $45,551, and the median income for a family was $43,105. Males had a median income of $26,250 versus $21,979 for females. The per capita income for the neighborhood was $14,778. About 40.5% of families and 53.7% of the population were below the poverty line, including 37.5% of those under age 18 and 13.6% of those age 65 or over.

== Education ==
The Martin City neighborhood is located in the Grandview School District and is served by Martin City Elementary and Middle School and Grandview High School in nearby Grandview, MO.

== Attractions ==
The area is known for its various restaurants and area business that have organized into the Martin City Community Improvement District (CID). The Martin City CID has been instrumental in organizing street construction, streetscape improvements, and security programs in the area business district. It sponsors community events such as the annual Martin City St. Patrick's Day Parade.

== See also ==
- List of neighborhoods in Kansas City, Missouri
