= Bracebridge Hall (Tarboro, North Carolina) =

Historic house in North Carolina, United States

- U.S. National Register of Historic Places
- U.S. Historic district
- Location within North Carolina Location within the United States
- Location: Macclesfield vicinity; also 7714 Colonial Rd. and both sides of Colonial Rd. at its junction with Carr Farm Rd., near Macclesfield, North Carolina
- Coordinates: 35°45′40″N 77°32′36″W
- Area: 149.7 acres (60.6 ha)
- Built: 1835
- Architectural style: Greek Revival, Victorian
- NRHP reference No.: 71000579, 05001412 (Boundary Increase)
- Added to NRHP: February 18, 1971, December 16, 2005 (Boundary Increase)

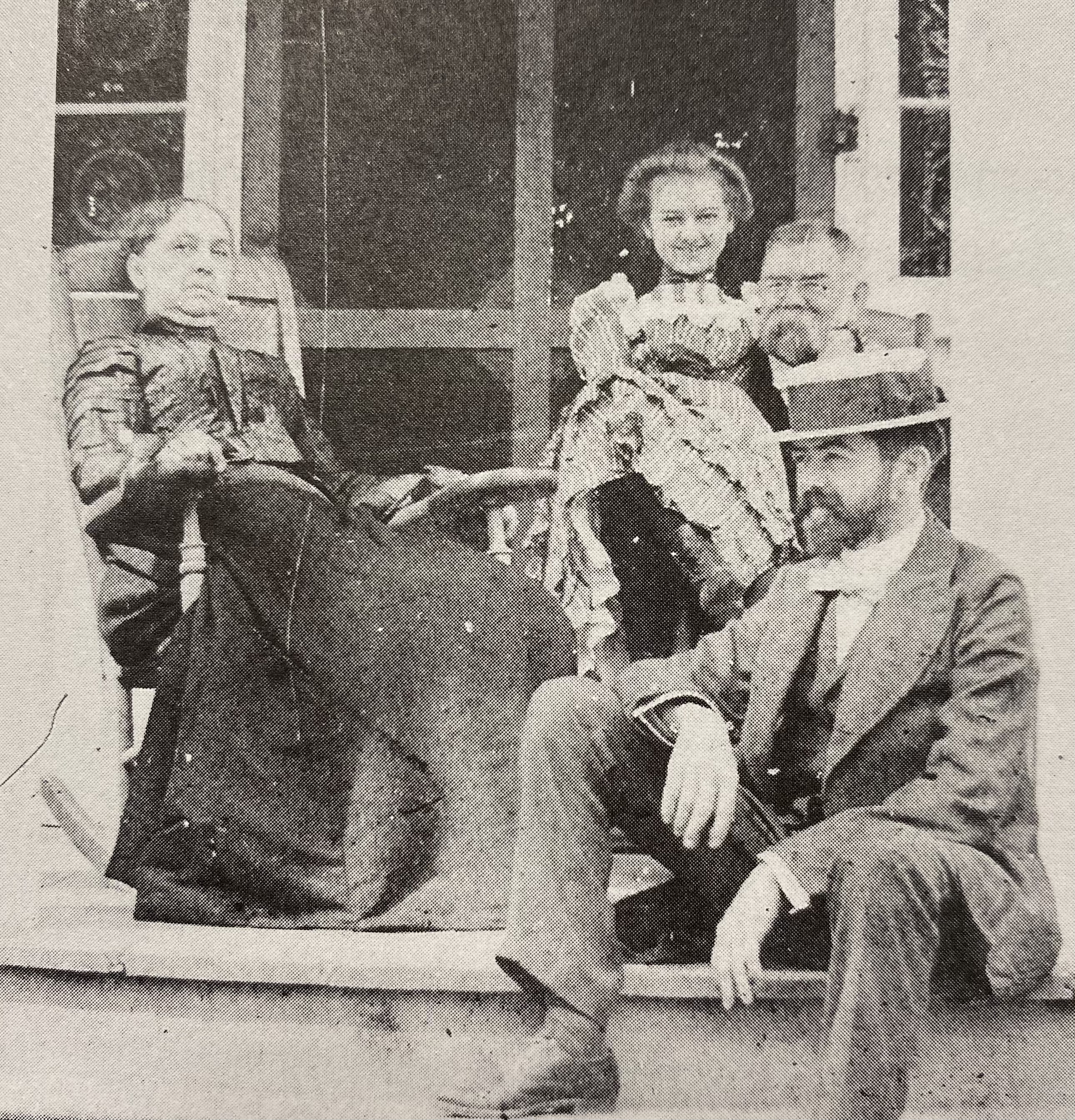
Governor Elias Carr, First Lady Eleanor Kearny Carr, and two others on the front porch at Bracebridge Hall

Bracebridge Hall is a historic plantation house and national historic district located near Macclesfield, Edgecombe County, North Carolina. The district encompasses eight contributing buildings, two contributing sites, and three contributing structures associated with the Bracebridge Hall plantation complex. The original house was built about 1830–1832, and enlarged about 1835–1840, 1880–1881, and 1885. It is a two-story, five bay, weatherboarded frame dwelling with Greek Revival and Victorian style design elements. It features a one-story Doric order portico. Also on the property are the contributing Metal boiler/basin (c. 1880–1900), Plantation Office (c. 1860–1885), Servants’ House (Aunt Pattie's House) (c. 1860–1885), Tobacco Barn (c. 1920), Troughs (c. 1890–1920), Large Barn (c. 1890–1915), Barn (c. 1920), Overseer's House (c. 1860–1885), Carr Cemetery (1820), and the Agricultural landscape. Buried in the cemetery is North Carolina Governor Elias Carr (1839-1900) and his wife Eleanor Kearny Carr (1840–1912).

It was listed on the National Register of Historic Places in 1971, with a boundary increase in 2005.
