= Sarah Amanda Sanders Russell =

American political hostess, temperance activist, and farmer

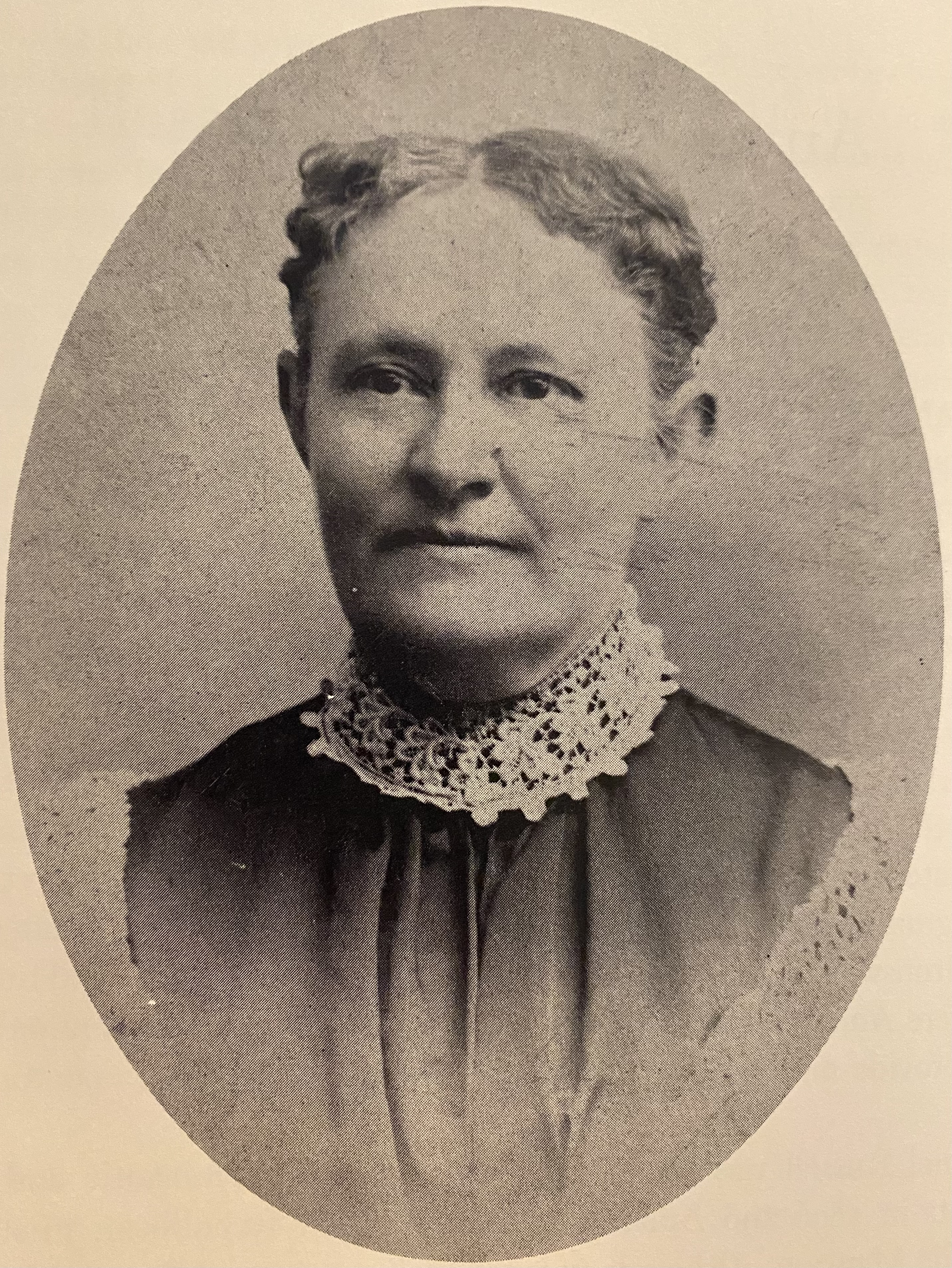

First Lady of North Carolina
- In role January 12, 1897 – January 15, 1901
- Governor: Daniel Lindsay Russell
- Preceded by: Eleanor Kearny Carr
- Succeeded by: Cora Lily Woodard Aycock

Personal details
- Born: Sarah Amanda Sanders; August 31, 1844 Onslow County, North Carolina, U.S.
- Died: March 18, 1913 (aged 68) Onslow County, North Carolina, U.S.
- Resting place: Aman Cemetery; Jacksonville, North Carolina
- Party: Republican
- Spouse: Daniel Lindsay Russell
- Parent(s): Isaac Newton Sanders; Caroline Burns
- Education: St. Mary's School

Sarah Amanda Sanders Russell (August 31, 1844 – March 18, 1913) was an American political hostess, temperance activist, and farmer. She served as the First Lady of North Carolina from 1897 to 1901 and was the first Republican First Lady to live in the North Carolina Executive Mansion. She and her husband supported emancipation of enslaved people and rights for African-Americans, which made them unpopular in the Democrat-majority state. She was a supporter of the temperance movement and women's suffrage, and was a member of the Woman's Christian Temperance Union. After her husband retired from politics, they lived at Belleville, their plantation in Brunswick County. At Belleville, Russell grew rice and pine, for turpentine, and operated a dairy.

== Early life ==
Russell was born Sarah Amanda Sanders in Onslow County, North Carolina on August 31, 1844, to Colonel Isaac Newton Sanders and Caroline Burns Sanders. Her father, who opposed Southern secession and the American Civil War, refused to fight for the Confederate States Army and the Union Army. Her father was deemed a traitor by both sides and stripped of his militia rank by Governor John W. Ellis, going into hiding during the war. Her father did not come out of hiding until Ellis's successor, Governor Zebulon Baird Vance, commissioned him as captain of the Home Defense. Russell's brother left his studies at the University of North Carolina at Chapel Hill to serve in the Confederate Army. Her mother died when she was young, and she spent most of her youth wearing black mourning dress.

Russell was sent to a boarding school in Beaufort, and later received an education at St. Mary's School in Raleigh. After her father's death in 1866, she and her sister, Alice, went to live with their uncle, John Sanders, at Elm Grove Plantation in Onslow County.

== Public life and activism ==
Russell's husband took office in January 1897. She and her husband were Republicans who supported the emancipation of enslaved people and the acceptance of African-Americans as political equals, which were unpopular views in the majority Democratic state. She and her husband both worried about the violence of white supremacist movements within the state.

Russell was the first Republican First Lady to live in the North Carolina Executive Mansion. She managed the household at the mansion, but left a lot of decisions of the running of the house to her servants. She had a new kitchen installed on the first floor of the mansion and left a well-stocked pantry for her predecessor.

She was a member of the Woman's Christian Temperance Union, promoting the temperance movement in the United States. Although she held some anti-feminist views, including that women "had their place and should not meddle in men's affairs", Russell was a suffragist.

== Personal life and farming ==
While living with her uncle at Elm Grove, she married her cousin Daniel Lindsay Russell. They had no children. The couple moved to Wilmington, where her husband was elected as a judge of the North Carolina Superior Court. They lived in Washington, D.C. while her husband served as a member of the United States Congress, and then settled at Belleville, their plantation in Brunswick County. At Belleville, Russell grew rice and pine, for producing turpentine. Russell purchased a cow to provide milk for her ailing niece, who lived with them, and later expanded the operation into a working dairy at Belleville.

She died of cancer on March 18, 1913.

Honorary titles
Preceded by Eleanor Kearny Carr	First Lady of North Carolina; 1897–1901	Succeeded by Cora Lily Woodard Aycock
