= Robert H. Hunt =

Mayor of Kansas City (1872-1873)

14th Mayor of Kansas City
- In office 1872–1873
- Preceded by: William Warner
- Succeeded by: Edward Lowe Martin

Personal details
- Born: Robert H. Hunt; 1839 County Kerry, Ireland
- Died: 1908 (aged 68–69)
- Party: Republican

Military service
- Allegiance: United States
- Branch/service: United States Army
- Years of service: 1861-1865
- Rank: Colonel
- Battles/wars: American Civil War; Battle of Mine Creek; Battle of Westport

Robert H. Hunt (1839–1908) fought for the Union Army during the American Civil War and was elected mayor of Kansas City, Missouri in 1872.

== Biography ==
Hunt was born in County Kerry, Ireland in 1839. His parents emigrated to the United States in 1847, taking their children with them. At the age of eight, Robert began to work as a waterboy on the railroad. At seventeen he entered Canandaigua Academy, in New York state.

In 1859, Hunt headed west and ended up in Kansas City. Being anti-slavery, he lived on the Kansas side of the state line, where he farmed. That same year, he married Miss Nellie Hoyne. With the outbreak of the Civil War in 1861, Hunt joined the Union Army as a private. He served for four years and eight months, moving up through the ranks, and eventually ended his service as a colonel.

During the war he was involved in many battles. Hunt directed the charge at the Battle of Mine Creek when Confederate General John S. Marmaduke was captured and Confederate General Sterling Price was defeated. Major Hunt also served as Chief of Artillery under General Samuel Curtis at the Battle of Westport, and sustained a head wound. For his contributions during this battle, Major Hunt was breveted lieutenant colonel.

In 1872, Colonel Hunt was elected the mayor of Kansas City, Missouri, serving one year. From 1874 to 1878, Colonel Hunt served on the Kansas City School Board. He died in 1908.

Political offices
Preceded by William Warner	Mayor of Kansas City, Missouri; 1872–1873	Succeeded by Edward Lowe Martin
