= J. P. Carnahan =

American professor (1832–1912)

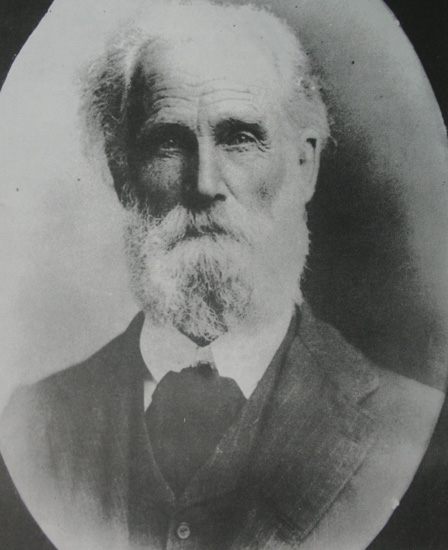
- Born: Jacob Preston Carnahan; September 22, 1832; Canehill, Arkansas, United States
- Died: July 16, 1912 (aged 79); Prairie Grove, Arkansas, United States
- Education: Cumberland University
- Occupations: Confederate States Army captain, professor, Populist politician
- Spouse: Susan Amelia Crawford Carnahan
- Children: 5

Jacob Preston Carnahan (September 22, 1832 – July 16, 1912) was an American Confederate officer, a professor of mathematics, and Populist politician in Arkansas. He ran for governor.

== Early life ==
Carnahan was born in Canehill, Arkansas on September 22, 1832. He attended the Cane Hill School and graduated from Cumberland University in Lebanon, Tennessee.

== Civil War ==
Carnahan was a captain in the Confederate States Army during the American Civil War, he commanded Company G of the 16th Arkansas Infantry Regiment, involved in the bloody Battle of Elkhorn Tavern, also known as the Battle of Pea Ridge.

== Educator ==
He was a professor of mathematics at Cane Hill College, formerly Cane Hill School from 1869 to 1883.

== Politician ==
He was candidate for governor with the People's Party of Arkansas in 1892, receiving 31,116 of 156,186 (20%) votes, losing to Democrat William Meade Fishback and winning narrowly fewer votes than Republican mayor of Little Rock, William G. Whipple.

== Personal life ==
He was married to Susan Amelia Crawford Carnahan. They had five children, three daughters Evalyn "Eve" Carnahan (Quailie), Mary Clementine "Clem" Carnahan (Moore), Susan E. Carnahan (Rogers), and sons Rev. Alfred E. Carnahan of Cane Hill and James Crawford Carnahan.

He died July 16, 1912, at the home of his youngest daughter, Mrs. Susan Rogers, near Prairie Grove. He was buried at Cane Hill..

Party political offices
First	Populist nominee for Governor of Arkansas; 1892	Succeeded by David E. Barker
