= Smith D. Woods =

American politician (1830–1888)

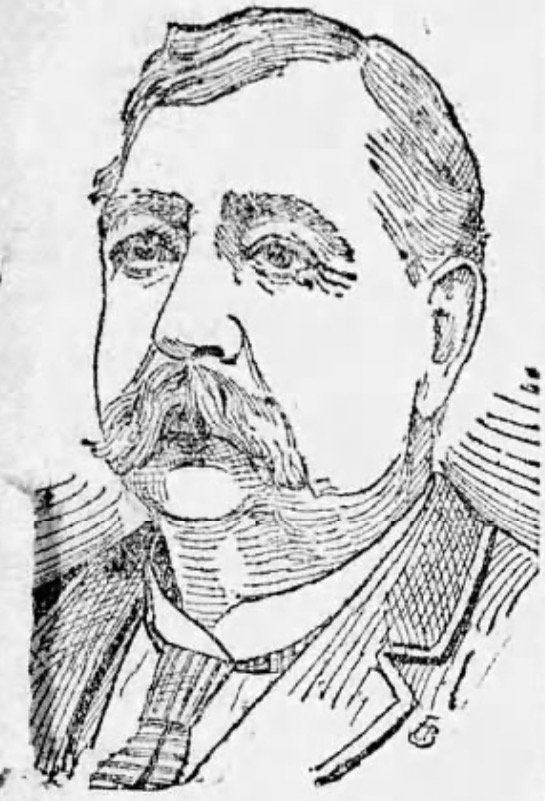

16th Mayor of Kansas City
- In office 1874–1875
- Preceded by: Edward Lowe Martin
- Succeeded by: Turner A. Gill

Personal details
- Born: December 2, 1830 Indiana, US
- Died: December 28, 1888 (aged 58)
- Party: Democratic

Smith D. Woods (December 2, 1830 – December 28, 1888) was an American politician. A Democrat, he served as mayor of Kansas City, Missouri from 1874 to 1875.

== Biography ==
Woods was born in Indiana. After moving to Kansas City, he operated a furniture store and then concentrated on real estate. He was elected as mayor in 1874.

Political offices
Preceded by Edward Lowe Martin	Mayor of Kansas City, Missouri; 1874–1875	Succeeded by Turner A. Gill
