= Jess & Jim's Steakhouse =

- Crowd gathered in front of Jess & Jim's during the 2013 Martin City St. Patrick's Day Parade
- Interactive map of Jess & Jim's Steakhouse

Restaurant information
- Established: April 15, 1938; 88 years ago
- Owner: Mike Van Noy
- Food type: steakhouse
- Location: 517 E 135th Street, Martin City, Missouri, 64145, USA
- Coordinates: 38°52′56″N 94°35′21″W
- Website: Official website

Jess & Jim's Steakhouse is a steakhouse restaurant located on 135th Street in Martin City, Missouri. Founded in 1938, Jess & Jim's has been ranked numerous times by national publications as one of the best steakhouses in the United States.

== History ==
Jess & Jim's originally opened for business in April 1938, near the corner of 135th Street and Holmes Road in Martin City, Missouri, near the location that is now occupied by Fiorella's Jack Stack Barbecue. Jess & Jim's was started as a small bar and grill by best friends Jess Kincaid and Jim Wright. After a short time, Jess Kincaid got married and sold his share of the business to Jim Wright; however, his name "Jess" in the restaurant name remained as a lasting reminder of his contributions and friendship with Jim Wright. In 1949, Wright's cousin R.C. Van Noy began working in the business.

On the evening of May 20, 1957 the F5 Ruskin Heights Tornado passed through Martin City on its way to leveling the newly built Ruskin Heights neighborhood. The restaurant was not opened on that Monday night, which may have saved many lives. The tornado destroyed the original Jess & Jim's building, but the owner's parakeet survived unharmed. Following the tornado, Wright moved the restaurant to its current location at 135th and Locust Street, because R.C. Van Noy already owned the building, and they didn't have insurance on the other building that was destroyed. Before Jess & Jim's moved into its current home, the building housed a pharmacy downstairs and Huffy's roller rink on the upper level.

== Awards and recognition ==
The restaurant has also earned accolades from several national publications:

- 1972 - Calvin Trillin named Jess & Jim's steakhouse "the finest in the world" in his article in Playboy Magazine.
- 1992 - USA Today named Jess & Jim’s amongst the top five steakhouses in the world.
- 2001 - Playboy Magazine again named Jess & Jim’s one of the top ten steakhouses in the world, calling it the "quintessential Midwestern steakhouse."
- 2008 - Esquire Magazine named the KC Playboy Strip at Jess & Jim's as one of the 20 Best Steaks in America
- 2013 - Travel + Leisure named Jess & Jim's among the best steakhouses in the United States
- 2013 - The Daily Meal listed Jess & Jim's at #9 in its list of America's 20 Best Steakhouses.
- 2014 - MSN listed Jess & Jim's at #47 on its list of America's 50 Best Steakhouses.
- 2014 - Travel Channel television series Food Paradise filmed a segment featuring Jess & Jim's in November.
- 2014 - Men's Journal recognized Jess & Jim's as being one of the 10 Best Steakhouses in the World
- 2016 - Yahoo Food went on a search for the best steakhouses. They ranked Jess and Jim's at the #8 spot on their list of the top ten steakhouses in the world.
- 2018 - The Daily Meal named Jess & Jim's as The Best Special Occasion Restaurant in the state of Missouri.
