= Edward Lowe Martin =

American politician (1842–1912)

Edward L. Martin
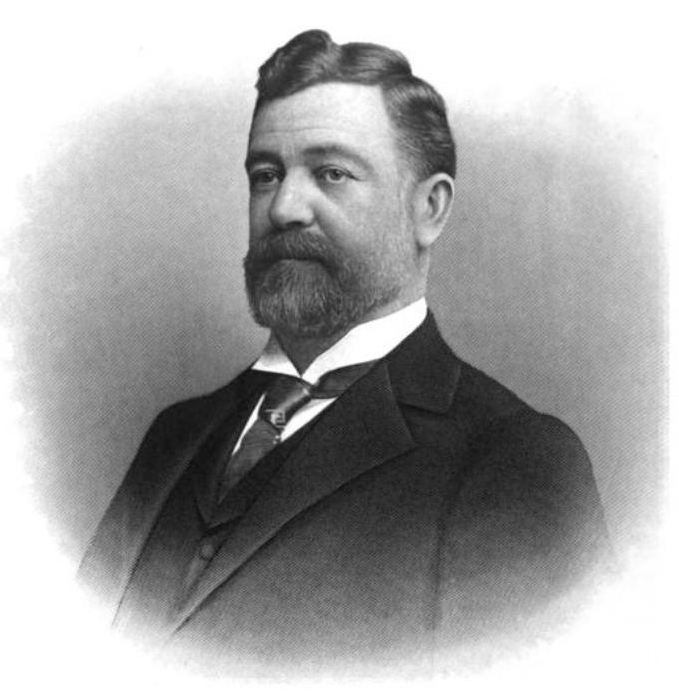

15th Mayor of Kansas City
- In office 1873–1874
- Preceded by: Robert H. Hunt
- Succeeded by: Smith D. Woods

Personal details
- Born: Edward Lowe Martin; March 12, 1842 Maysville, Kentucky, U.S.
- Died: December 15, 1912 (aged 70) Excelsior Springs, Missouri, U.S.
- Resting place: Elmwood Cemetery; Kansas City, Missouri, U.S.
- Party: Democratic
- Spouse: Mary Elizabeth Ricketts Martin
- Children: Lulu M. Martin Gaines; Edward P. Martin

Edward Lowe Martin (March 12, 1842 – December 15, 1912) was an American politician who served as the Mayor of Kansas City, Missouri. The town of Martin City was named in honor of him; and would eventually be incorporated into and become a neighborhood of Kansas City in 1963.

== Early life and education ==
Edward Lowe Martin was born in Maysville, Kentucky, on March 12, 1842, to parents William Martin and Margaret Sheridan Martin. Edward's parents emigrated to Kentucky from Belfast, Ireland in 1822. Edward was educated in private schools in Kentucky until age 16, when he began working in the field of business.

== Business career ==
Edward Martin began his business career at age 16 as a shipping clerk for a wholesale grocery house. When the Civil War broke out in 1861, Martin was placed in charge of the business when the owner was jailed as a Confederate sympathizer. Martin liquidated the business and returned the proceeds to the family of the owner. Martin's next occupation was that of head bookkeeper at the largest hardware store in his region of Kentucky. He remained in that position until 1864, when he resigned and moved to a similar position at a large wholesale grocery company in Cincinnati, Ohio. After a year, Martin became a partner in the business and remained there until 1868.

In 1868 Martin moved to Kansas City, Missouri, where he was the head of the E. L. Martin & Company wholesale liquor business and organized the Kansas City Distilling Company.

== Public service ==
He became mayor of Kansas City, Missouri, in 1873. Martin was also active in the Board of Education in which he served from 1875 to 1896.

== Personal life ==
Edward Lowe Martin died in Excelsior Springs, Missouri on December 15, 1912. He was buried in Elmwood Cemetery in Kansas City.

Political offices
Preceded by Robert H. Hunt	Mayor of Kansas City, Missouri; 1873–1874	Succeeded by Smith D. Woods
