= William T. Faircloth =

American judge

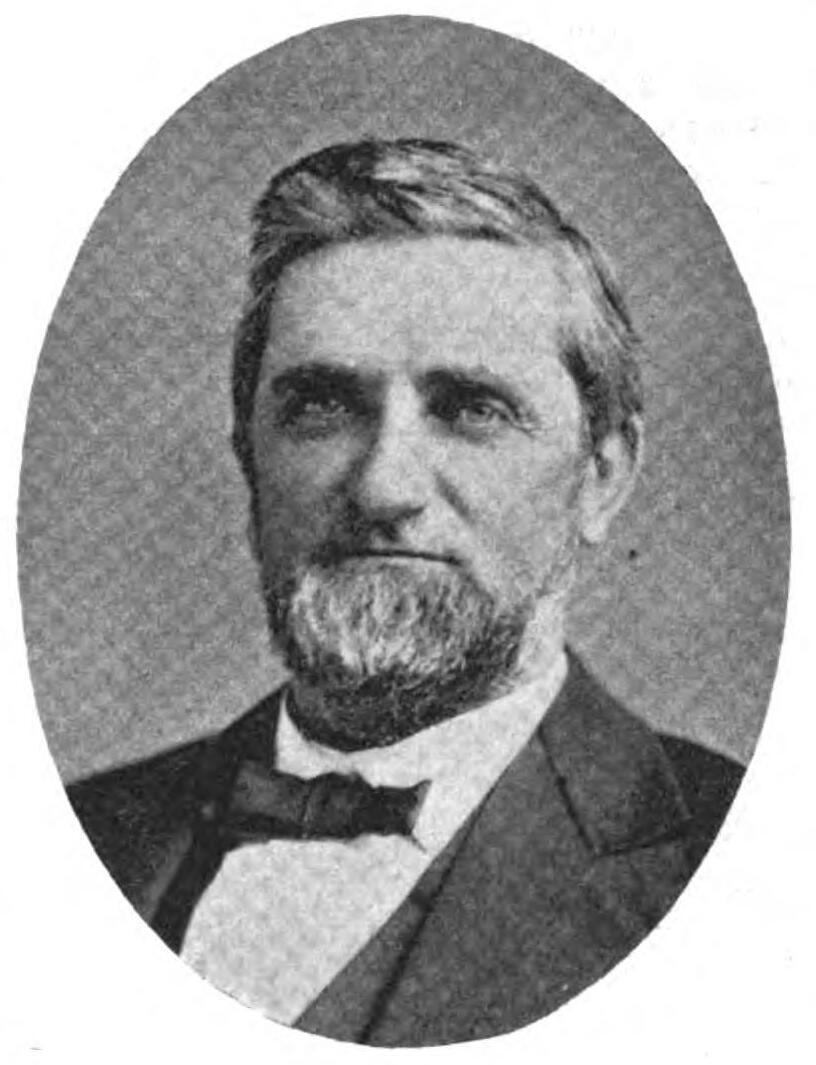
- Born: 8 January 1829; Edgecombe County
- Died: 29 December 1900 (aged 71); Goldsboro
- Occupation: Lawyer, politician, judge
- Position held: member of the North Carolina House of Representatives, Chief Justice of the North Carolina Supreme Court

William Turner Faircloth (1829–1900) was the chief justice of the North Carolina Supreme Court from 1895 until his death on December 29, 1900.

According to his New York Times obituary, Faircloth was, at the time of his death, one of the wealthiest men in his hometown, Goldsboro, North Carolina, where he served on the board of directors of the Bank of Wayne. He was also described as "one of the most prominent Republicans in Eastern North Carolina."

Faircloth was born in Edgecombe County, North Carolina. He practiced law before serving in the Second North Carolina Infantry during the American Civil War. In 1867, he married Eviline Wooten.

Faircloth was elected to represent Wayne County in the North Carolina House of Commons and at a state constitutional convention, both in 1865. As of 1867, he was solicitor (district attorney) for the state's Second Circuit. He was appointed to the state Supreme Court in 1875 by Gov. Curtis Hooks Brogden, and served until 1879. He was the Republican nominee for Lieutenant Governor of North Carolina in 1884, losing to Charles M. Stedman. He was nominated by the Republicans for the state Supreme Court in 1890, but lost. In the 1894 election, as the "fusion" nominee of Republicans and Populists, Faircloth defeated incumbent Chief Justice James E. Shepherd.

Party political offices
| Preceded by Rufus Barringer | Republican nominee for Lieutenant Governor of North Carolina; 1884 | Succeeded by Jeter C. Pritchard |
Legal offices
| Preceded by James E. Shepherd | Chief Justice of North Carolina Supreme Court; 1895–1900 | Succeeded by David M. Furches |
