= Tarsney, Missouri =

Unincorporated community in Missouri, U.S.

Coordinates: 38°56′29″N 94°12′57″W

Tarsney is an unincorporated community in Jackson County, in the U.S. state of Missouri.

== History ==
A post office called Tarsney was established in 1891, and remained in operation until 1902. The community has the name of John Charles Tarsney, a state legislator.
