= James E. Shepherd =

American judge

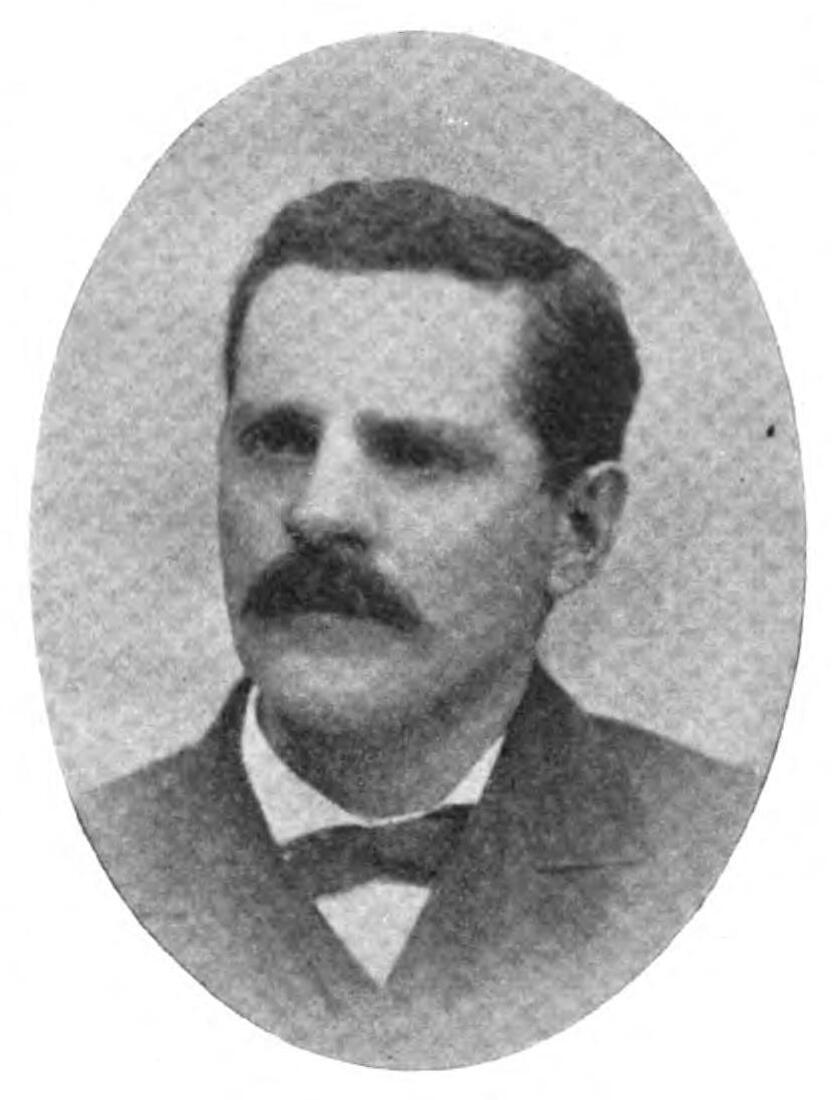
- Born: 26 July 1847; Suffolk urban area
- Died: 7 February 1910
- Resting place: Historic Oakwood Cemetery
- Occupations: Lawyer, judge

James Edward Shepherd (1847–1910) was an American lawyer and jurist who served on the North Carolina Supreme Court (1888-1895), three years as chief justice.

== Early life and education ==
Shepherd was born at Mintonville, near Suffolk, Virginia, the son of Thomas Swepson Shepherd (1811–1860) and his first wife Ann Eliza Browne (1813–1852). After the outbreak of the American Civil War, James, not quite 14 years old, claimed to be eighteen and joined Company A, 16th Regiment, of the Virginia Infantry, as a private.

At the end of summer in 1862, Lee's Army of Northern Virginia moved into Maryland during its first invasion of the North. During this campaign young Shepherd revealed that he was only fifteen and was discharged from military service near Frederick, Maryland, on September 8. He spent the remainder of the war as a telegraph operator under contract with the C.S.A. War Department, first in Giles County, Virginia, then at Wilson, North Carolina.

Shepherd attended the University of North Carolina at Chapel Hill in 1867 and 1868.

== Career ==
He was admitted to the bar and opened a practice in Wilson in 1869. After marrying, Shepherd moved to Washington, North Carolina to join his father-in-law in his law practice.

He became active in local politics, serving as chairman of the Beaufort County Democratic Party. In 1875, Shepherd was elected delegate from Beaufort and Pamlico counties to the state Constitutional Convention, where he authored a provision on county government.

The following year, 1876, he was elected judge of the Beaufort County Inferior Court. He served for five years. In 1882 Shepherd was elected judge of the Superior Court.

In 1888 he was elected as an associate justice of the North Carolina Supreme Court and was appointed chief justice in late 1892 (after the death of Chief Justice Augustus Summerfield Merrimon). Shepherd served as chief justice until 1895, when he was defeated for re-election to the high court.

Legal offices
| Preceded by Augustus S. Merrimon | Chief Justice of North Carolina Supreme Court; 1892 - 1895 | Succeeded by William T. Faircloth |
