= 1892 Missouri lieutenant gubernatorial election =

- November 8, 1892
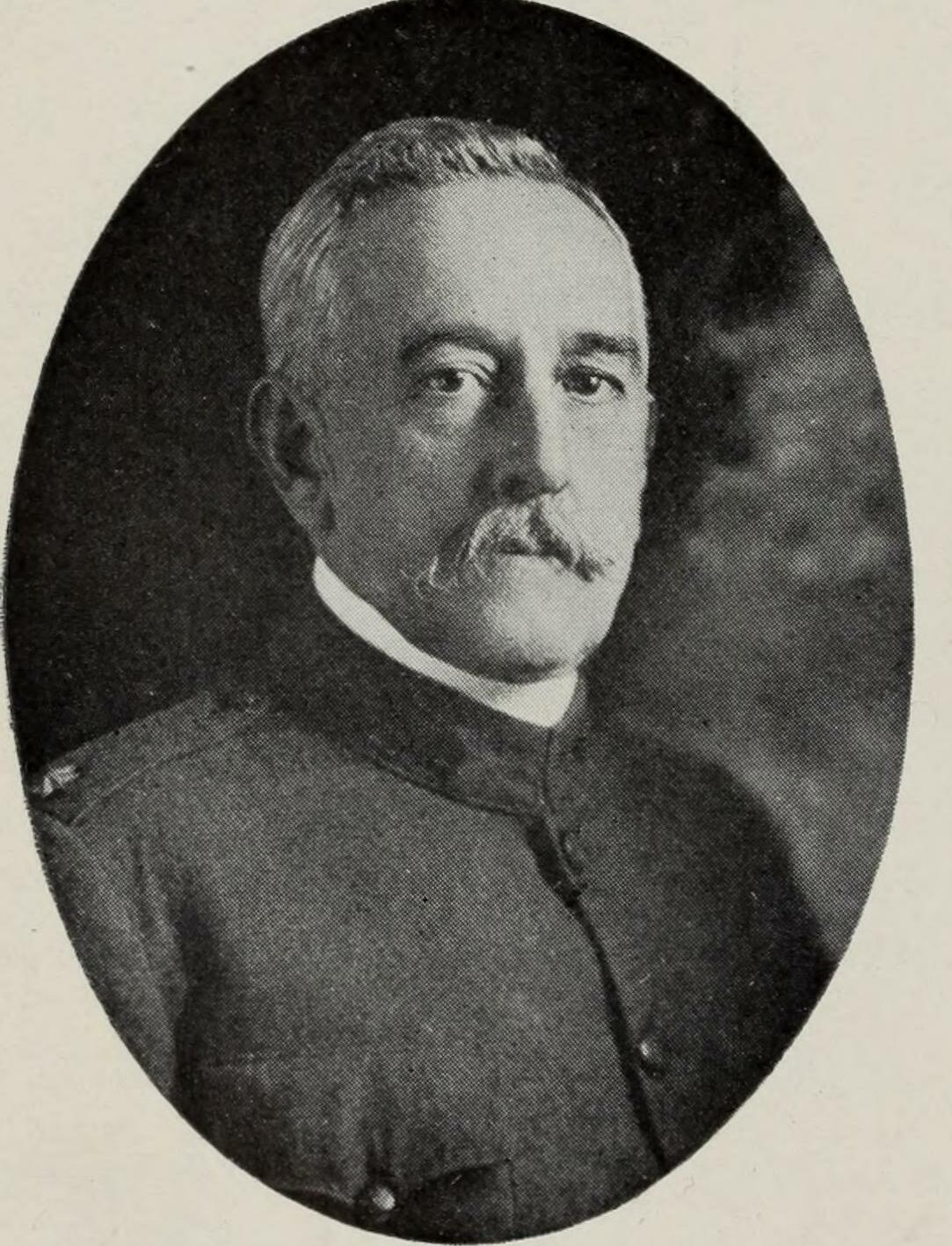

Nominee	John Baptiste O'Meara	Rudolph W. Mueller	George W. Williams
Party	Democratic	Republican	Populist
Popular vote	263,000	231,184	41,293
Percentage	48.73%	42.84%	7.65%
- County results O'Meara: 30–40% 40–50% 50–60% 60–70% 70–80% 80–90% Mueller: 40–50% 50–60% 60–70% 70–80% Tie: 40–50%
Lieutenant Governor before election
Stephen Hugh Claycomb
Democratic
Elected Lieutenant Governor
John Baptiste O'Meara
Democratic

The 1892 Missouri lieutenant gubernatorial election was held on November 8, 1892, in order to elect the lieutenant governor of Missouri. Democratic nominee John Baptiste O'Meara defeated Republican nominee Rudolph W. Mueller, People's nominee George W. Williams and Prohibition nominee William S. Crouch.

== General election ==
On election day, November 8, 1892, Democratic nominee John Baptiste O'Meara won the election by a margin of 31,816 votes against his foremost opponent Republican nominee Rudolph W. Mueller, thereby retaining Democratic control over the office of lieutenant governor. O'Meara was sworn in as the 22nd lieutenant governor of Missouri on January 9, 1893.

=== Results ===
Missouri lieutenant gubernatorial election, 1892
Party	Candidate	Votes	%
Democratic	John Baptiste O'Meara	263,000	48.73
Republican	Rudolph W. Mueller	231,184	42.84
Populist	George W. Williams	41,293	7.65
Prohibition	William S. Crouch	4,204	0.78
Total votes		539,681	100.00
Democratic hold			

== See also ==
- 1892 Missouri gubernatorial election
