= Turner A. Gill =

American politician (1841–1919)

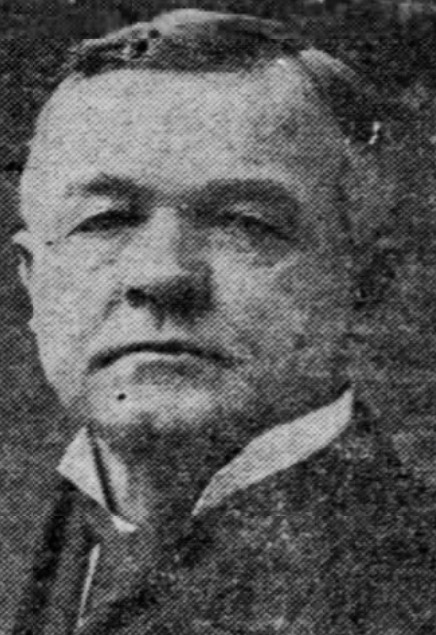

17th Mayor of Kansas City
- In office 1875–1876
- Preceded by: Smith D. Woods
- Succeeded by: James W. L. Slavens

Personal details
- Born: Turner Anderson Gill; December 8, 1841 Bath County, Kentucky, US
- Died: July 18, 1919 (aged 77)
- Resting place: Elmwood Cemetery
- Party: Democratic
- Education: University of Missouri
- Profession: Lawyer; politician

Military service
- Allegiance: Confederate States of America
- Branch/service: Confederate States Army
- Rank: Captain
- Unit: 6th Missouri Infantry
- Battles/wars: American Civil War

Turner Anderson Gill (December 8, 1841 – July 18, 1919) was an American politician. A Democrat, he served as mayor of Kansas City, Missouri from 1875 to 1876.

== Biography ==
Gill was born in Bath County, Kentucky on a farm. He received a law degree from the University of Missouri.

During the American Civil War he fought on the Confederate side and was wounded at the Battle of Corinth and Battle of Champion's Hill in Mississippi. He was captured at Vicksburg, Mississippi. After being exchanged he joined General Shelby's regiment, was promoted to captain, and participated in the Battle of Westport.

During his term as mayor he inherited a city that was deeply in debt and having to pay its bills with script. He successfully reestablished Kansas City's credit, earning him the nickname "Little Giant of the Third Ward".

After serving as mayor he was a city counselor and became a circuit court judge.

Political offices
| Preceded by Smith D. Woods | Mayor of Kansas City, Missouri; 1875–1876 | Succeeded by James W. L. Slavens |
