= James W. L. Slavens =

American politician (1838–1905)

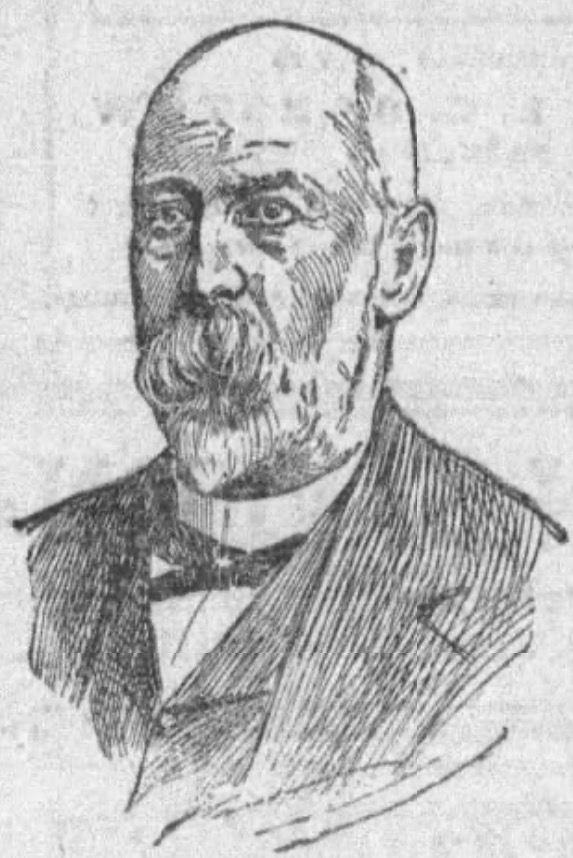

18th Mayor of Kansas City, Missouri
- In office 1877–1878
- Preceded by: Turner A. Gill
- Succeeded by: George M. Shelley

Personal details
- Born: August 3, 1838 Putnam County, Indiana, U.S.
- Died: February 10, 1905 (aged 66) Leavenworth, Kansas, U.S.
- Resting place: Union Cemetery; Kansas City, Missouri, U.S.
- Party: Republican
- Spouse: Martha McNutt (m. 1859)
- Children: 8
- Education: Indiana Asbury University
- Occupation: Meat packer; politician

James W. L. Slavens (August 3, 1838 – February 10, 1905) was an American businessman and politician. A Republican, he served as mayor of Kansas City, Missouri from 1877 to 1878, and as mayor of Westport in 1894. He established one of the first meat-packing companies in Kansas City.

== Early life ==
Slavens was born on August 3, 1838, in Putnam County, Indiana, to Sarah (née Holland) and Hiram B. Slavens. His father was a farmer who helped establish Indiana Asbury University. Slavens graduated from Indiana Asbury in 1859.

== Career ==
After graduating, Slavens moved to Douglas County, Illinois. Until 1870, he was engaged in farming. He started to study law and in 1861 he joined the practice of William McKenzie in Tuscola, Illinois. Slavens joined the Union Army soon after the start of the Civil War. He was appointed as quartermaster of the 73rd Illinois. He was later detailed for duty at the subsistence department. In his last year, he joined the staff of General George H. Thomas. He was mustered out in July 1865.

In 1865, Slavens moved to Jackson County, Missouri and then Independence. He came to Kansas City in 1866. He formed a law partnership with his brother, Luther C. Slavens. He practiced law with his brother for about eight years.

In the spring of 1868, Slavens, along with E. W. Pattison and William Epperson, started a meat-packing business. Afterward, Slavens got into business with J. C. Ferguson and J. L. Nofsinger. The company operated as Ferguson, Slavens & Co. for four years. Then it was renamed as Slavens, Mansur & Co. with J. H. Mansur. In 1875, Slavens was found guilty of fraud by the Red Cloud Agency Investigative Commission after supplying 600 barrels of inferior grade pork. Slavens was excluded from future contracts with the government.

Slavens became the city treasurer of Kansas City in 1867 and served for one year. He was elected on a Republican ticket as Mayor of Kansas City, Missouri serving from 1877 to 1878. He later became mayor of Westport in 1894.

Slavens was elected vice president of the Live Stock Dealers' and Packers' Exchange in 1873.

== Personal life ==
Slavens married Martha "Mattie" McNutt of Vevay, Indiana, in 1859. They had eight children, Hiram C., Leander P., Luther C., James M., Carl C., May, Mrs. Clifford Jenkins and John Henry (died 1904).

When mayor, the Slavens family lived on Quality Hill. The Slavens family lived at the southwestern corner of 10th & Jefferson Streets in Kansas City. They then lived at 3200 Main Street. Around 1895, they lived at 3016 Oak Street.

Slavens died on February 10, 1905, aged 66, at the Soldiers' Home in Leavenworth, Kansas. He was temporarily buried at the McGee Vault in Union Cemetery in Kansas City.

Political offices
Preceded by Turner A. Gill	Mayor of Kansas City, Missouri; 1877–1878	Succeeded by George M. Shelley
