= Eleanor Kearny Carr =

First Lady of North Carolina

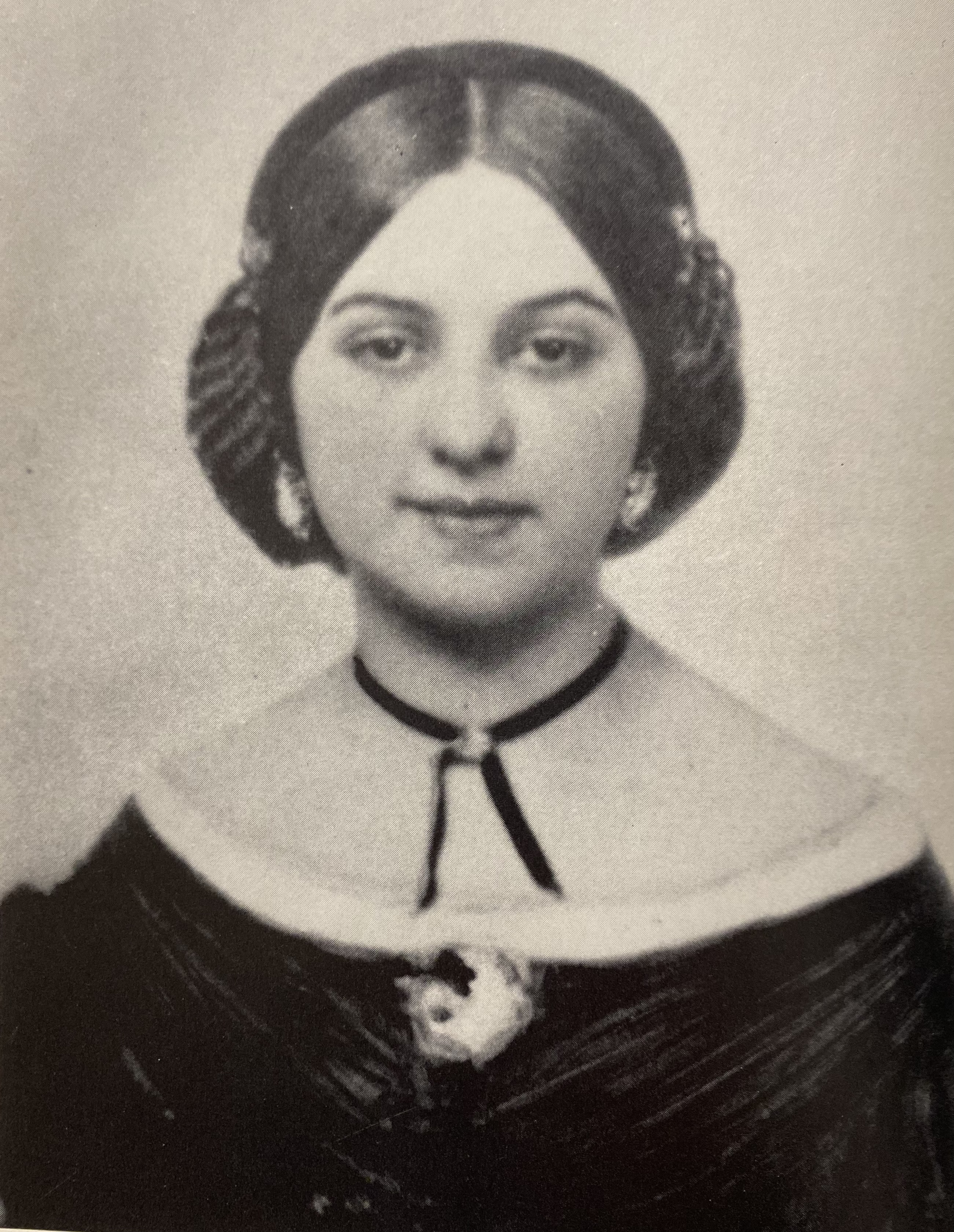

First Lady of North Carolina
- In role January 18, 1893 – January 12, 1897
- Governor: Elias Carr
- Preceded by: Louisa Moore Holt
- Succeeded by: Sarah Amanda Sanders Russell

Personal details
- Born: William Eleanor Kearny; March 1, 1840 Warrenton, Warren County, North Carolina, U.S.
- Died: March 29, 1912 (aged 72) Washington, D.C., U.S.
- Resting place: Bracebridge Hall, Edgecombe County, North Carolina, U.S.
- Party: Democratic
- Spouse: Elias Carr
- Children: 6
- Parent(s): William Kinchen Kearny; Maria Alston
- Relatives: Julian Carr (cousin-in-law); Mary Hilliard Hinton (niece)

William Eleanor Kearny Carr (March 1, 1840 – March 29, 1912) was an American planter and political hostess who served as the First Lady of North Carolina from 1893 to 1897 as the wife of Governor Elias Carr. She was a charter member and librarian of the first North Carolinian chapter of the Daughters of the American Revolution.

== Early life and education ==
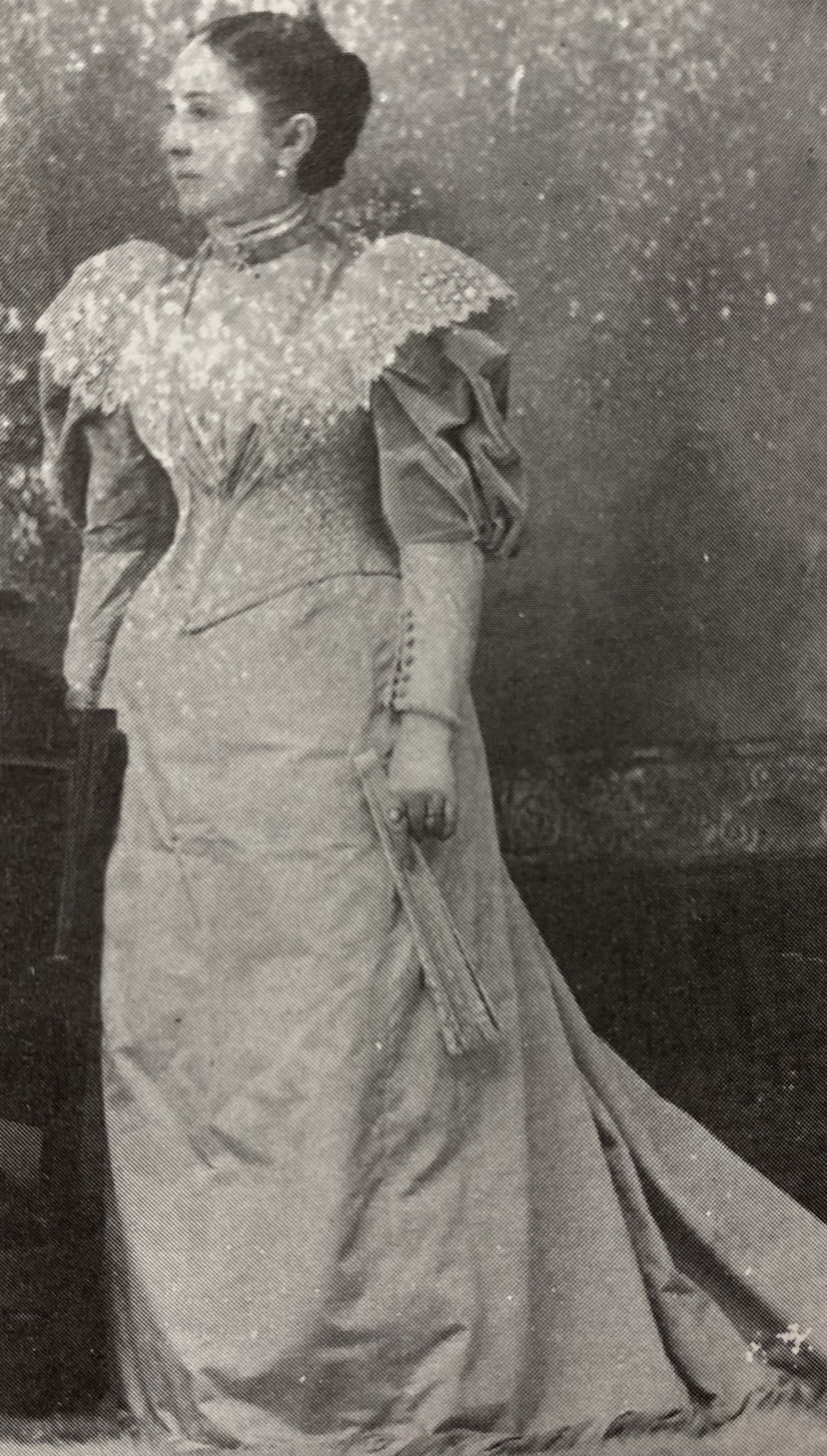
Carr in her inaugural ball gown

Carr was born William Eleanor Kearny on March 1, 1850, to William Kinchen Kearny, a wealthy planter in Warren County, and his wife, Maria Alston. She was a granddaughter of William Alston, who represented Bute County at the North Carolina Provincial Congress and served as a lieutenant colonel in the 3rd North Carolina Regiment during the American Revolution. Kearny grew up at Huntersville, her family's plantation, and was raised in the Methodist faith. Kearny was first educated at home by private tutors and, later, at a girls' school in Petersburg, Virginia.

== Adult life ==
On May 24, 1859, Kearny married Elias Carr, a wealthy planter from Edgecombe County, in a large ceremony that was considered a big society event in Warren County. She was given an elaborate wedding ring, an opal surrounded by diamonds, by her husband. Upon her marriage, she moved to Carr's family's plantation, Bracebridge Hall. Kearny and her husband had six children: William Kearny Carr, John Buxton Carr, Mary Elizabeth Carr, Elias Carr Jr., Eleanor Kearny Carr, and Annie Bruce Carr. She converted to Episcopalianism after marrying Carr, but continued to attend both Methodist and Episcopal services. She instructed her children in religious education and hired private tutors for schooling before sending her children to private schools. As châtelaine of Bracebridge Hall, Kearny was known to run the household with efficiency and did much of the sewing and cooking herself.

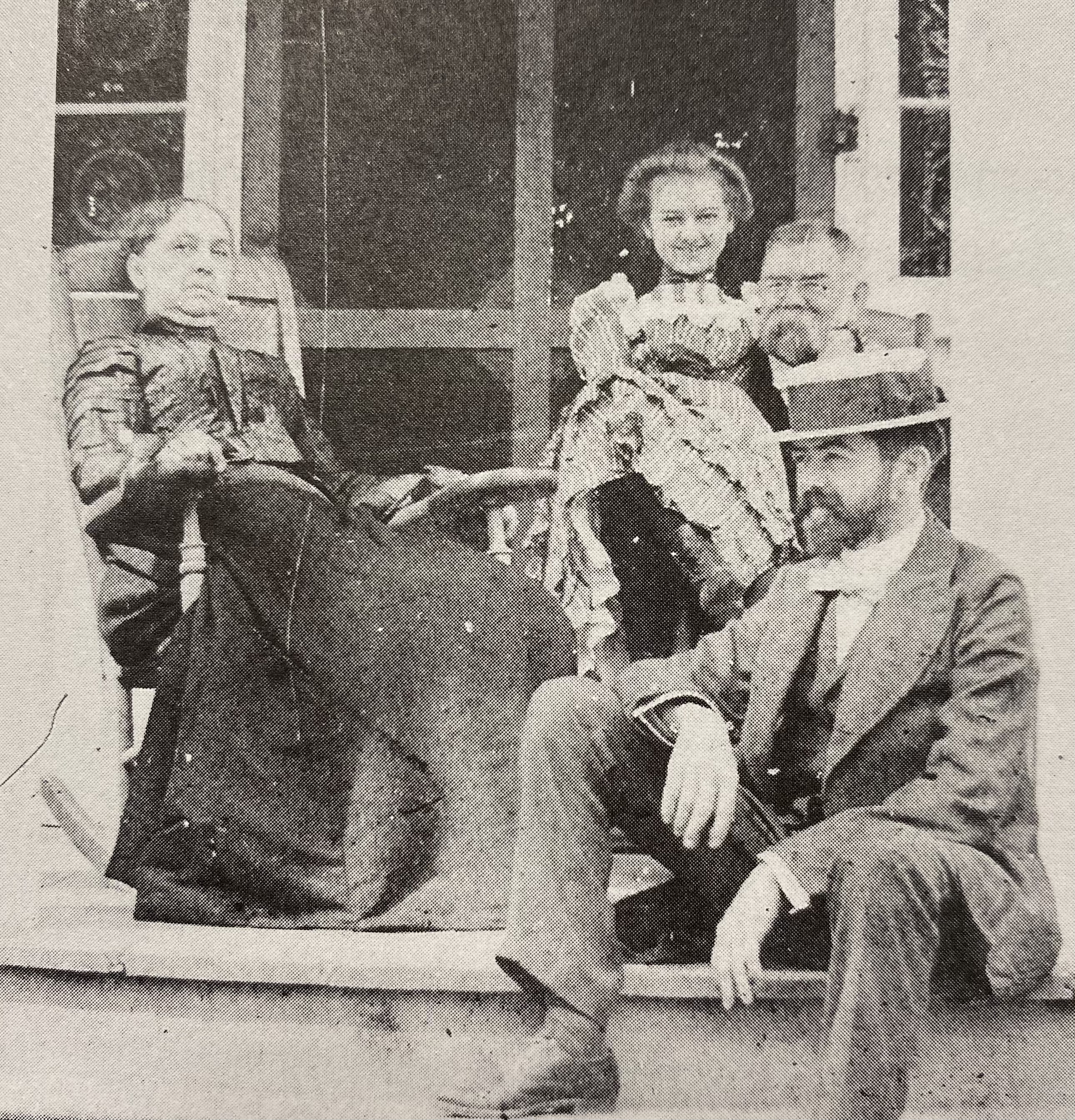
Carr and her family on the front porch of Bracebridge Hall

Kearny's father, William, told her that the air in Edgecombe County was conductive to the spread of malaria, and convinced his daughter to spend summers in Warren County instead of on her husband's plantation. In the earlier years of their marriage, Kearny and her children spent summers at Huntersville. In 1867, Carr purchased an estate in Warrenton to be used as a summer residence for Kearny. While away for the summers, Kearny would receive letters from her husband expressing his love and affection for her and the children, keeping her up to date on news with their plantation, and discussing politics.

In 1871, while waiting for a train in Weldon, North Carolina, Kearny reportedly sat in a barroom.

In 1893, Kearny's husband was elected as Governor of North Carolina. She was relatively uncomfortable in the role as hostess of the executive mansion, so her daughter-in-law, Martina Van Riswick Carr, assisted her in her role. After the North Carolina General Assembly allocated funds to purchase furniture for and make repairs on the executive mansion in February 1893, Kearny oversaw the renovations and redecorating. She also oversaw extensive work on the grounds of the mansion. Kearny hired David Haywood to serve as the butler for the first family; he ended up serving fourteen different governors and their families in his career.

Kearny was a charter member of her chapter of the Daughters of the American Revolution, and served as her chapter's first librarian.

== Death ==
She died on March 29, 1912, in Washington D.C., where she was undergoing surgery. Her body was later returned to North Carolina and buried in the family plot at Bracebridge Hall.

Honorary titles
Preceded by Louisa Moore Holt	First Lady of North Carolina; 1893–1897	Succeeded by Sarah Amanda Sanders Russell
