= Wyatt P. Exum =

American farmer, physician and politician

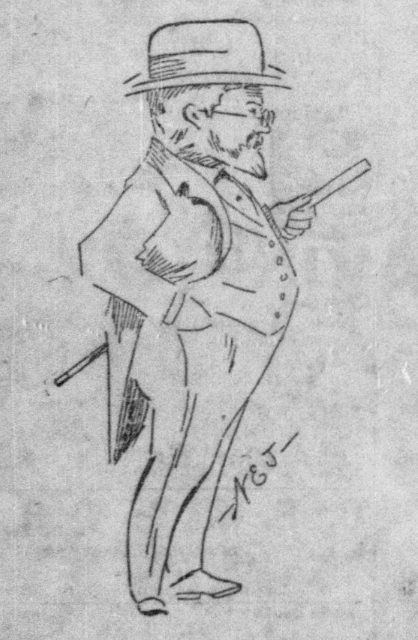
1896 caricature of Exum

Wyatt Patrick Exum (1836 – August 17, 1911) was an American farmer, physician and politician. Born in Wayne County, North Carolina, he studied medicine at Trinity College and served in the Confederate States Army during the American Civil War. Left impoverished by the war, he resumed his medical practice and eventually made enough money to establish a farm in Wayne County. Exum joined the Populist Party and was nominated as its candidate in the 1892 North Carolina gubernatorial election after the first candidate withdrew. Politically unknown in much of the state, Exum was a poor public speaker and his campaign was marked by several scandals publicized by the Democratic press, including an incident where he attacked Charles B. Aycock with a knife. He placed third in the election, winning a majority of the votes in only three counties. His health declined as he aged and he died in 1911.

== Early life ==
Wyatt P. Exum was born in 1836 in Wayne County, North Carolina, United States. His father served in the North Carolina Senate. He was trained in medicine at Trinity College and opened a medical practice shortly before the outbreak of the American Civil War. He served in the Confederate States Army during the war in a cavalry unit under Colonel Thomas Hart Ruffin.

By the end of the war Exum was impoverished. He resumed his medical practice and eventually garnered the funds to purchase land in Wayne County which he cleared and turned into a farm. In time his farm became successful and he grew wealthy. He married and had two children.

== Political career ==
Exum was initially a member of the Democratic Party, but became disillusioned with Democratic presidential candidate Grover Cleveland in 1888. He joined the Populist Party and attended its first state convention in North Carolina in 1892. At Exum's formal suggestion, the convention initially nominated Harry Skinner to serve as the party's candidate in the 1892 North Carolina gubernatorial election. In his acceptance speech, Skinner appealed to the convention to allow him the discretion to withdraw from the race should the Republican Party's candidate appear to be leading and threaten the rule of the "white man" in the state. Many delegates were infuriated by the notion of backing out of the election, and Exum moved to have the nomination vote reconsidered, with 25 other men seconding his motion. Exum subsequently withdrew from the nomination, throwing the convention into turmoil. Exum and James M. Mewborne were then offered as potential gubernatorial candidates and in a speech Exum proclaimed to the convention that he supported the Omaha Platform and would remain an active candidate in the election. In the first ballot Exum received 263 votes while Mewborne garnered 220. The delegates then voted a second time unanimously for Exum.

At the time he won the Populist nomination for governor, Exum was relatively unknown across North Carolina. Populist newspapers were also unsure of how to describe him. During the campaign he proved a poor public speaker and frequently lost his temper in debates with other candidates. He was regularly criticized by Democratic-aligned newspapers. Two weeks after he was nominated, The News & Observer reported on him being fined by the mayoral court of Goldsboro for using obscene language in front of women at the local post office. Shortly thereafter, The Wilmington Messenger publicized the fact that Exum had been earlier indicted for a concealed weapon violation and threatening someone's life. Rumors circulated in the press that he would withdraw his candidacy or be replaced by his party.

Late in the campaign, Exum participated in a debate with Democrat Charles B. Aycock at Snow Hill. During the debate, Exum called Aycock a liar and refused to withdraw the accusation. Afterwards, the two left together for Goldsboro, joined by Populist Marion Butler. On the way they stopped at Exum's house, where Aycock and Butler asked Exum to apologize. Exum refused, leading Aycock to accuse him of lying. In response, Exum brandished a large knife, and Aycok grabbed a stick and struck him. Exum then tackled the Democrat and slashed his head and arm before Butler intervened and separated them. Exum then told Butler to remove himself from the situation or be killed before his wife ran out of the house and convinced him and Aycock to cease fighting. Exum was subsequently excoriated by the Democratic press, causing deep embarrassment to the Populist Party. Democrat Elias Carr won the gubernatorial election with about 135,00 votes, Republican David M. Furches placed second with 94,684 votes, and Exum placed last with 47,840 votes, winning a majority of the votes in only three counties.

== Later life ==
Exum's health declined as he aged and he died at his country retreat near Snow Hill on August 17, 1911. A funeral was held form him in Goldsboro two days later.

== Works cited ==
- Beeby, James M. (2008). Revolt of the Tar Heels: The North Carolina Populist Movement, 1890-1901. University Press of Mississippi. ISBN 9781604733242.
- Edmonds, Helen G. (2013). The Negro and Fusion Politics in North Carolina, 1894-1901 (revised ed.). Chapel Hill: The University of North Carolina Press. ISBN 9781469610955.
- Hunt, James L. (2003). Marion Butler and American Populism. Chapel Hill: University of North Carolina Press. ISBN 9780807862506.

Party political offices
Vacant	Populist nominee for Governor of North Carolina; 1892	Succeeded by William A. Guthrie
