= 1892 New York City mayoral election =

- November 8, 1892
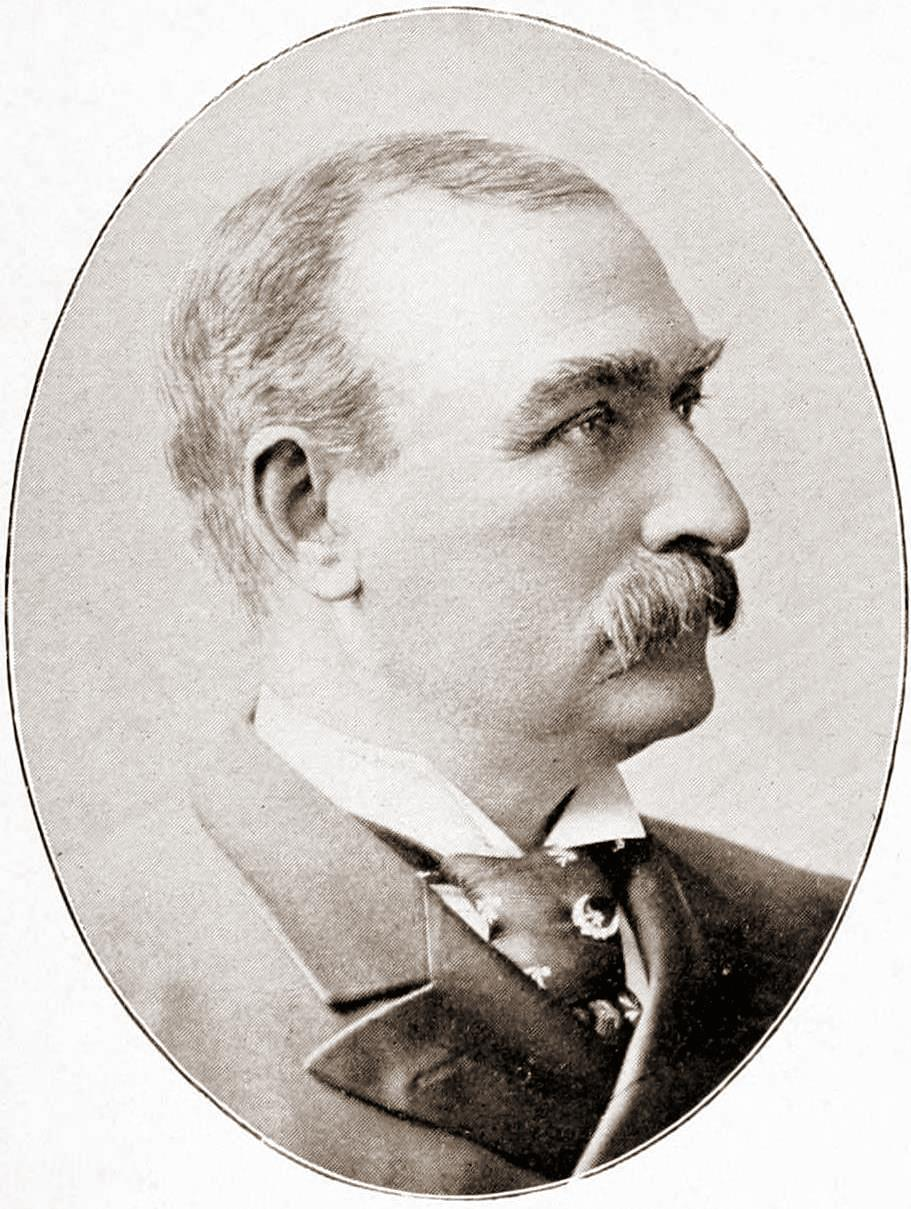

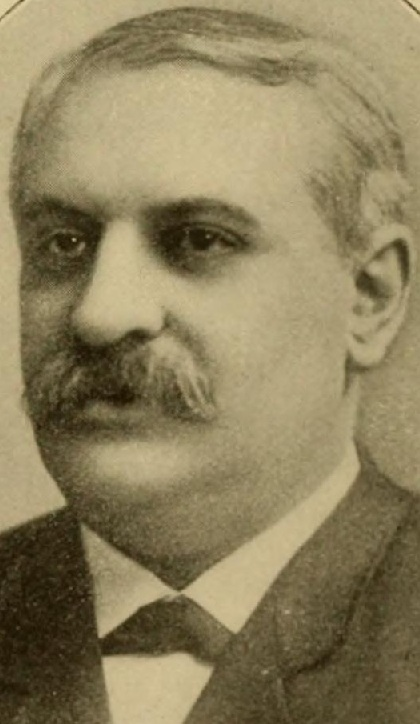
Nominee	Thomas F. Gilroy	Edwin Einstein
Party	Democratic	Republican
Popular vote	173,510	97,923
Percentage	61.4%	34.6%
Mayor before election
Hugh J. Grant
Democratic
Elected mayor
Thomas F. Gilroy
Democratic

An election for Mayor of New York City was held on November 8, 1892. Incumbent mayor Hugh J. Grant was not a candidate for a third consecutive term in office. He was succeeded by Thomas Francis Gilroy, who defeated Republican Edwin Einstein in a landslide. Gilroy's margin of victory "exceed[ed] by nearly 20,000 the greatest majority obtained by a New York mayoralty candidate in twenty-four years."

== General election ==
The Tammany Hall political machine controlled much of New York politics during the period. Thomas Francis Gilroy, a leading figure in Tammany Hall and the commissioner of public works, accepted the Democratic nomination in October 1892. Despite this, he is often simply described as the 'Tammany candidate'. The main Tammany policies at the time were "firm, efficient, and honest government", low taxes, and opposition to Know Nothing xenophobia.

The Democratic candidate in the concurrent presidential election, Grover Cleveland, had been a staunch opponent of Tammany Hall, and Tammany had supported their own candidate for the Democratic nomination, David B. Hill. It was rumoured that Tammany would support the Republican Party in the presidential election if the Republicans left them to elect Gilroy and a slate of Tammany aldermen in New York City. Because New York was a key battleground state in the presidential election and held the most sway with 36 electoral votes, Tammany's support was important for either candidate.

=== Candidates ===
- Joseph A. Bogardus, hardware merchant and former president of the American Temperance Union (Prohbition)
- Edwin Einstein, businessman and former U.S. representative (Republican)
- Thomas Francis Gilroy, Grand Sachem of Tammany Hall (Democratic)
- Henry Hicks (Populist)
- Alexander Jonas, candidate for mayor in 1878 and 1888 (Socialist)

There was a "strong feeling ... in favor" of putting up a candidate among anti-Tammany Democrats. John Quinn was reported as a candidate for mayor, running on an anti-Tammany Democrat ticket, but he is not found on the ballot.

=== Results ===
According to writer Gustavus Myers, there was "as usual" widespread electoral fraud and in several districts, the opposition vote was "practically nothing". One Tammany politician was noted for having secured for Gilroy all but four votes in his district. The result was expected, with the American Register declaring in October that "Tammany will carry the election and make Mr. Gilroy Mayor."

1892 New York City mayoral election
Party	Candidate	Votes	%
Democratic	Thomas F. Gilroy	173,510	61.43%
Republican	Edwin Einstein	97,923	34.56%
Socialist Labor	Alexander Jonas	6,295	2.23%
Prohibition	Joseph A. Bogardus	2,575	0.91%
Populist	Henry Hicks	2,466	0.87%
Democratic hold			

=== Results by assembly district ===
1892 New York mayoral election (by assembly district)
Assembly district	Gilroy (Dem.)		Einstein (Rep.)		Jonas (Soc.)		Bogardus (Prohib.)		Hicks (People's)	
Assembly district	#	%	#	%	#	%	#	%	#	%
1st district	6100	72.57	2051	24.40	86	1.02	95	1.13	74	0.88
2nd district	9206	78.69	2110	18.04	155	1.32	111	0.95	117	1.00
3rd district	5402	64.25	2543	30.25	297	3.53	77	0.92	89	1.06
4th district	5002	65.93	2240	29.52	223	2.94	41	0.54	81	1.07
5th district	5193	58.44	3099	34.88	449	5.05	71	0.80	74	0.83
6th district	6092	62.21	3115	31.81	413	4.22	73	0.75	99	1.01
7th district	7537	61.00	4104	33.22	557	4.51	78	0.63	79	0.64
8th district	7434	60.39	4532	36.82	110	0.89	125	1.02	109	0.89
9th district	6012	55.20	4490	41.22	127	1.17	149	1.37	114	1.05
10th district	6940	67.37	2871	27.87	324	3.15	78	0.76	89	0.86
11th district	4255	50.98	3866	46.32	82	0.98	81	0.97	62	0.74
12th district	5774	68.29	2393	28.30	126	1.49	67	0.79	95	1.12
13th district	5829	57.67	3967	39.25	110	1.09	109	1.08	92	0.91
14th district	6654	69.52	2597	27.13	140	1.46	73	0.76	107	1.12
15th district	5344	60.14	3193	35.93	207	2.33	64	0.72	78	0.88
16th district	6689	65.20	3155	30.75	252	2.46	88	0.86	75	0.73
17th district	4480	57.34	3021	38.67	157	2.01	86	1.10	69	0.88
18th district	5023	60.97	2929	35.55	139	1.69	73	0.89	74	0.90
19th district	5418	59.40	3380	37.06	113	1.24	102	1.12	108	1.18
20th district	4415	63.71	2026	29.24	325	4.69	88	1.27	76	1.10
21st district	4618	50.97	4315	47.63	31	0.34	54	0.60	42	0.46
22nd district	4838	62.52	2316	29.93	459	5.93	52	0.67	73	0.94
23rd district	5685	51.79	5021	45.74	104	0.95	103	0.94	64	0.58
24th district	5466	61.55	2992	33.69	304	3.42	54	0.61	65	0.73
25th district	5037	64.04	2490	31.66	208	2.64	67	0.85	64	0.81
26th district	6913	60.98	4030	35.56	209	1.84	97	0.86	87	0.77
27th district	7125	56.07	5259	41.39	117	0.92	118	0.93	88	0.69
28th district	5270	56.29	3810	40.69	99	1.06	105	1.12	79	0.84
29th district	5559	59.59	3323	35.62	268	2.87	104	1.11	74	0.79
30th district	4200	58.74	2685	37.55	104	1.45	92	1.29	69	0.97
