= William Warner (Missouri politician) =

American politician (1840–1916)

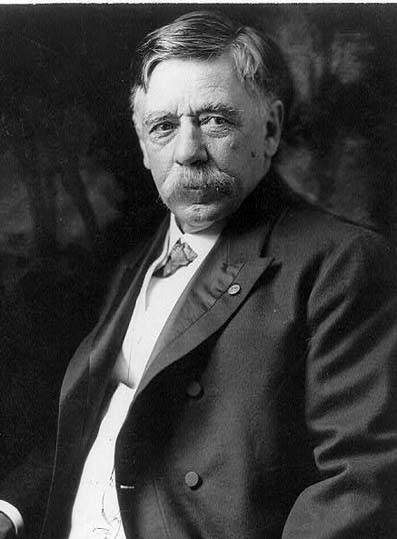

United States Senator from Missouri
- In office March 18, 1905 – March 3, 1911
- Preceded by: Francis Cockrell
- Succeeded by: James A. Reed

Member of the U.S. House of Representatives from Missouri's 5th district
- In office March 4, 1885 – March 3, 1889
- Preceded by: Alexander Graves
- Succeeded by: John C. Tarsney

13th Mayor of Kansas City
- In office 1871–1872
- Preceded by: Elijah M. McGee
- Succeeded by: Robert H. Hunt

Personal details
- Born: William Warner; June 11, 1840 Shullsburg, Territory of Wisconsin
- Died: October 4, 1916 (aged 76) Kansas City, Missouri, U.S.
- Party: Republican
- Education: University of Michigan Law School

Military service
- Allegiance: United States
- Branch/service: Army
- Years of service: 1862-1865
- Rank: Major
- Unit: 33rd Wisconsin Infantry Regiment
- Battles/wars: American Civil War

William Warner (June 11, 1840 – October 4, 1916) was an American lawyer and politician based in Kansas City, Missouri. He became mayor of Kansas City in 1871, serving a one year term. He later represented Missouri in both the U.S. House of Representatives and the U.S. Senate.

== Early life ==
Warner was born in Shullsburg, in Lafayette County, Wisconsin. His parents died in his youth, and he was raised by his sister, Mary Ann Warner Webb and her husband, Daniel Webb III. He studied law at Lawrence University and the University of Michigan at Ann Arbor and admitted to the bar in 1861. He enlisted in 1862 as a 1st Lieutenant in the 33rd Wisconsin Volunteer Infantry Regiment and was mustered out at the close of the Civil War in Madison, Wisconsin with the rank of major. He married Sophia Frances Bullen on August 7, 1866. They had six children.

== Political career ==
Warner then moved his practice to Kansas City, where he served as city attorney in 1867, circuit attorney in 1868, and as the mayor of Kansas City, Missouri in 1871. He was elected as a Republican to the 49th and 50th Congresses, serving from March 4, 1885 to March 3, 1889, but he was not a candidate for renomination in 1888.

Warner was elected commander in chief of the Grand Army of the Republic in 1888 for a one-year term. He was also a member of the Wisconsin Commandery of the Military Order of the Loyal Legion of the United States.

Warner unsuccessfully ran as the Republican candidate for Missouri Governor in 1892, but served as the United States district attorney for the western district of Missouri in 1882-1884, 1898, and 1902–1905. In 1882, he was one of the original incorporators of the Kansas City Club.

In 1905, Warner was elected as a Republican to the United States Senate, serving from March 18, 1905 to March 3, 1911 in the 60th and 61st Congresses, where he was chairman of the Senate Committee on Mississippi River and Its Tributaries, and served on the Inland Waterways Commission. He was not a candidate for reelection.

== Later life ==
Warner resumed the practice of law and was appointed as a civilian member of the Board of Ordnance and Fortifications and a member of the Board of Managers of the National Home for Disabled Volunteer Soldiers. His widow, Sophia, received a pension until her death in 1923.

== Notes ==
Party political offices
Preceded by Elbert Kimball	Republican nominee for Governor of Missouri; 1892	Succeeded by Robert E. Lewis
Political offices
Preceded by Elijah M. McGee	Mayor of Kansas City, Missouri; 1871–1872	Succeeded by Robert H. Hunt
U.S. House of Representatives
Preceded by Alexander Graves	Representative for the 5th congressional district of Missouri; 1885–1889	Succeeded by John Charles Tarsney
U.S. Senate
Preceded by Francis Cockrell	U.S. senator (Class 1) from Missouri; 1905–1911; Served alongside: William J. Stone	Succeeded by James A. Reed
