= Elias Carr =

American politician (1839–1900)

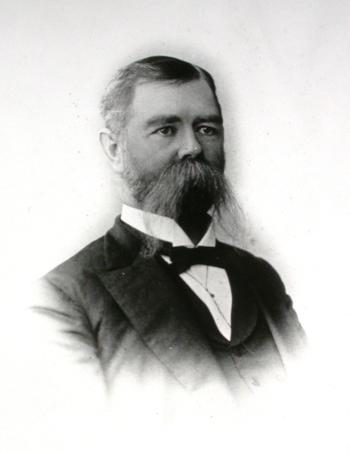

48th Governor of North Carolina
- In office January 18, 1893 – January 12, 1897
- Lieutenant: Rufus A. Doughton
- Preceded by: Thomas Michael Holt
- Succeeded by: Daniel Lindsay Russell

Personal details
- Born: Elias Carr; February 25, 1839 Edgecombe County, North Carolina, U.S.
- Died: July 22, 1900 (aged 61) Edgecombe County, North Carolina, U.S.
- Party: Democratic
- Spouse: Eleanor Kearny
- Children: 6
- Education: University of North Carolina at Chapel Hill
- Profession: Lawyer, politician, planter

Elias Carr (February 25, 1839 – July 22, 1900) was an American planter, lawyer, and politician who served as the 48th governor of the U.S. state of North Carolina from 1893 to 1897.

== Biography ==
Carr was born in Edgecombe County, North Carolina on February 25, 1839, to Jonas Johnston Carr and Elizabeth Jane Hilliard. He was a cousin of the industrialist Julian Carr and an uncle of the anti-suffragist Mary Hilliard Hinton. Carr's great-grandfather, Colonel Jonas Johnston, fought in the American Revolutionary War. Carr grew up at Bracebridge Hall, his family's plantation. He was raised in the Episcopal faith.

He graduated from the University of North Carolina at Chapel Hill (1855–1859) and also attained a law degree from the University of Virginia and then returned to Bracebridge Hall. He married Eleanor Kearny, the youngest daughter of William Kinchen Kearny and Benjamin Hardee James Marie Alston Kearny, in 1860 and was the father of six children: Dr. William Kearny Carr, John Buxton Carr, Mary Elizabeth Carr, Elias Carr, Eleanor Kearny Carr, and Annie Bruce Carr. Carr was a member of the board of directors of Rocky Mount Mills, trustee of N.C. College of Agriculture and Mechanical Arts (today known as North Carolina State University), commissioner of the N.C. Geological Survey, agriculturist, and businessman. He was an active member of the Sons of the American Revolution and chartered his chapter in North Carolina.

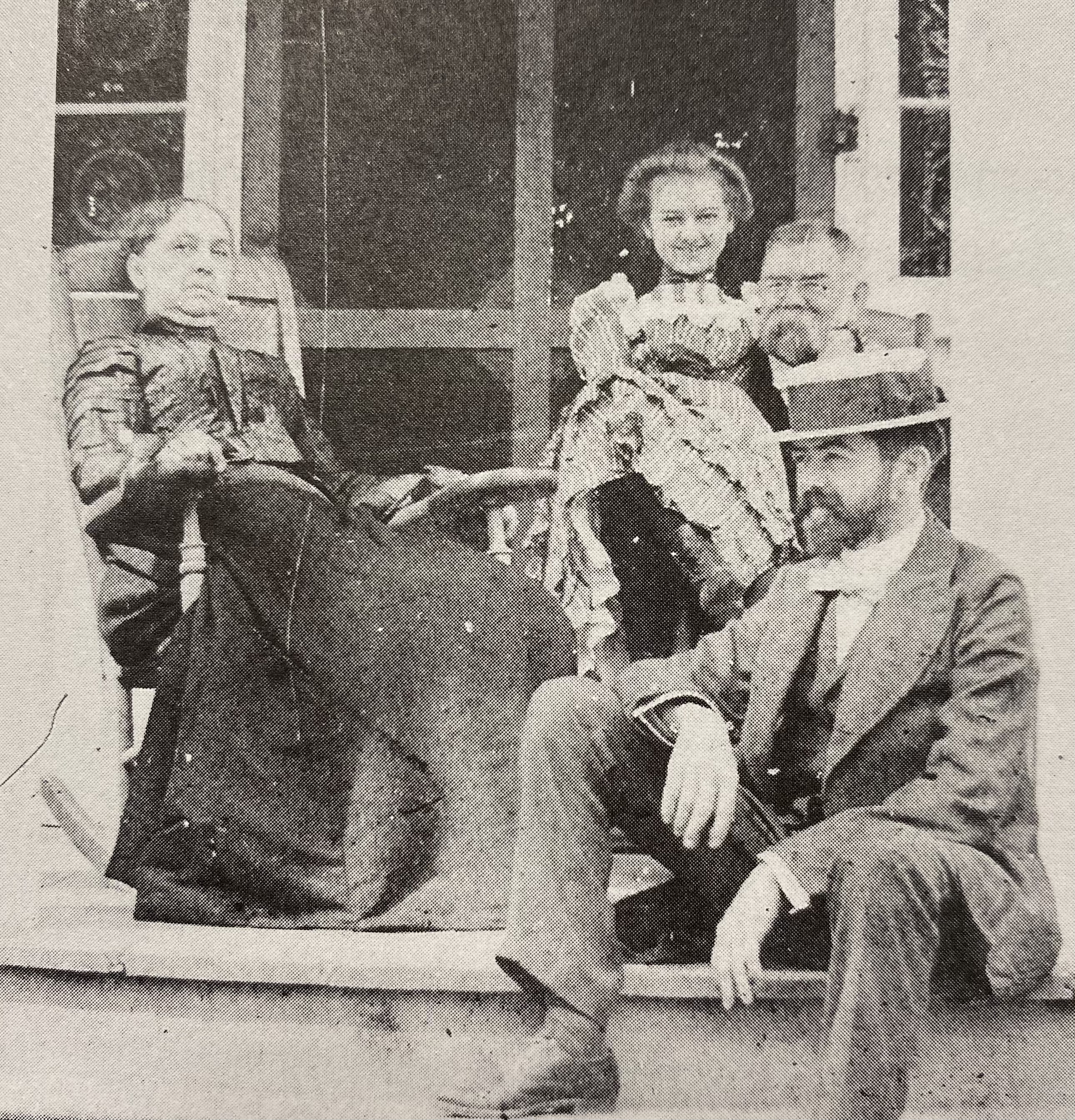
Carr and his family on the front porch of Bracebridge Hall

Carr became prominent as head of the state Farmers Alliance and Industrial Union (1889–1892). He was part of a more moderate or conservative faction of the Alliance that opposed splitting from Democrats to form a third party. In 1892, he defeated incumbent Gov. Thomas Michael Holt for the Democratic gubernatorial nomination. Carr then won the three-way race over the Republican candidate, Judge David M. Furches, and the Populist candidate, Dr. Wyatt P. Exum. Carr did not win an absolute majority of the vote, perhaps foreshadowing the 1894 election, in which Democrats lost control of the legislature to an electoral fusion of Populists and Republicans, and the 1896 election, in which Democrats lost the governor's race for the first time since 1872. During his term in office, Carr promoted better school facilities and regulation of railroads. After his governorship, he returned to Bracebridge Hall where he died of a 'thyroid condition' in July 1900. He is buried in the Carr Cemetery at Bracebridge Hall.

Party political offices
Preceded by Daniel Gould Fowle	Democratic nominee for Governor of North Carolina; 1892	Succeeded by Cyrus B. Watson
Political offices
Preceded by Thomas Michael Holt	Governor of North Carolina; 1893-1897	Succeeded by Daniel Lindsay Russell
