= Tilden, Missouri =

Unincorporated community in Missouri, U.S.

Coordinates: 37°42′22″N 92°57′38″W

Tilden is an unincorporated community in Dallas County, in the U.S. state of Missouri. The community was on Missouri Route MM approximately two miles west of Windyville. The Niangua River flows past just over one mile to the south of the location.

== History ==
A post office called Tilden was established in 1887, and remained in operation until 1920. The community has the name of Samuel J. Tilden (1814–1886), American politician and candidate in the highly contested 1876 Presidential election.
