= 1892 United States elections =

- ← 1890 1891 1892 1893 1894 → Presidential election year
- Election day: November 8
- Incumbent president: ▌Benjamin Harrison (R)
- Next Congress: 53rd

Presidential election
- Partisan control: Democratic gain
- Popular vote margin: Democratic +3.0%
- Electoral vote
- Grover Cleveland (D): 277
- Benjamin Harrison (R): 145
- James B. Weaver (P): 22
- 1892 presidential election results. Red denotes states won by Harrison, blue denotes states won by Cleveland, and green denotes states won by Weaver. Numbers indicate the electoral votes won by each candidate.

Senate elections
- Overall control: Democratic gain
- Seats contested: 29 of 88 seats
- Net seat change: Democratic +4
- Results of the elections: Democratic gain Democratic hold Republican hold Silver Republican gain Populist gain Legislature failed to elect

House elections
- Overall control: Democratic hold
- Seats contested: All 356 voting members
- Net seat change: Republican +38

Gubernatorial elections
- Seats contested: 32
- Net seat change: Populist +3
- 1892 gubernatorial election results Democratic gain Democratic hold Republican gain Republican hold Populist gain

Elections were held on November 8, 1892, electing members to the 53rd United States Congress, taking place during the Third Party System. The Democrats retained the House and won control of the presidency and the Senate. Following the election, the Democrats controlled the presidency and a majority in both chambers of Congress for the first time since the 1858 elections.

In the presidential election, the Republican President Benjamin Harrison was defeated by former Democratic President Grover Cleveland. Cleveland won the popular vote by a margin of 3%, but won by a large margin in the electoral college. Populist James B. Weaver also carried five Western states and won a little over 8% of the vote. At the 1892 Republican National Convention, Harrison fended off a challenge from supporters of former Secretary of State James G. Blaine and Governor William McKinley of Ohio. At the 1892 Democratic National Convention, Cleveland defeated Senator David B. Hill from New York and Governor Horace Boies of Iowa on the first ballot. Harrison had previously defeated Cleveland in 1888, and Cleveland's win made him the first President to serve non-consecutive terms. Cleveland's win in the popular vote also made him the second person, after Andrew Jackson, to win the popular vote in three presidential elections.

Reapportionment following the 1890 census added twenty four seats to the House. Republicans picked up several seats in the House, but Democrats continued to command a large majority in the chamber.

In the Senate, Democrats made moderate gains to win a majority in the chamber for the first time since 1881.

== See also ==
- 1892 United States presidential election
- 1892 United States House of Representatives elections
- 1892–93 United States Senate elections
