= John C. Tarsney =

American politician

John Charles Tarsney
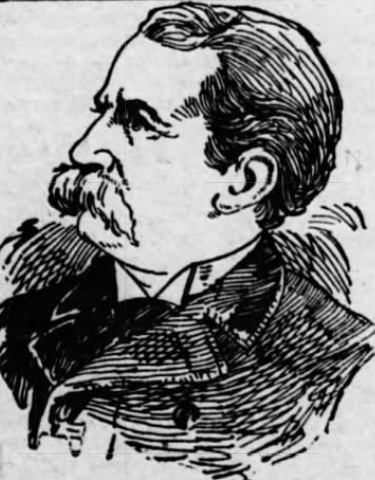

Member of the U.S. House of Representatives from Missouri's 5th district
- In office March 4, 1889 – February 27, 1896
- Preceded by: William Warner
- Succeeded by: Robert T. Van Horn

Personal details
- Born: November 7, 1845 Medina Township, Michigan, U.S.
- Died: September 4, 1920 (aged 74) Kansas City, Missouri, U.S.
- Resting place: Mount St. Mary’s Cemetery, Kansas City, Missouri
- Spouse: Mary Behan (m. 1871-1917, her death)
- Relations: Thomas A. E. Weadock (brother-in-law)
- Children: 5
- Education: University of Michigan Law School
- Profession: Attorney

Military service
- Allegiance: United States of America (Union)
- Branch/service: Union Army
- Years of service: 1862-1865
- Rank: Private
- Unit: 4th Michigan Volunteer Infantry Regiment
- Battles/wars: American Civil War

John Charles Tarsney (November 7, 1845 – September 4, 1920) was an American politician from Missouri and an associate justice of the Oklahoma Territory Supreme Court (1896-1899). He then returned to Kansas City, Missouri, where he had a private law practice until he died in 1920.

== Early life and service in the Union Army ==
Tarsney was born in Medina Township, Lenawee County, Michigan, and attended a University of Michigan, Ann Arbor. After graduation, he worked on a farm until the outbreak of the Civil War. He enlisted in the 4th Michigan Volunteer Infantry Regiment in August 1862. During the Battle of Gettysburg he was captured and imprisoned at Belle Isle (Richmond, Virginia), later being moved to Andersonville Prison and Camp Lawton. He escaped from Camp Lawton by temporarily taking the identity of a recently deceased soldier. He returned to his regiment in January 1865 and took part in the battles at Hatcher's Run and Five Forks. He also participated in the surrender of Appomattox. Tarsney was discharged from the army in June 1865.

== Education and career ==
After being discharged from military service, Tarsney attended high school in Hudson, Michigan and graduated in 1867. Subsequently, he studied law at the University of Michigan Law School, from which he graduated in 1869. He was admitted to the bar in the same year and practiced in Hudson. In 1872, he moved to Kansas City, Missouri and served as city attorney of Kansas City in 1874 and 1875. In 1875, Tarsney became the attorney for Consolidated Street Railways of Kansas City, where he remained until 1888. His brother, Timothy E. Tarsney, was a U.S. Representative from Michigan. In 1888, he was elected as a representative to the U.S. Congress and re-elected three more times in 1890, 1892 and 1894.

His sister Mary married Thomas A. E. Weadock, who later became a U.S. Representative from Michigan.

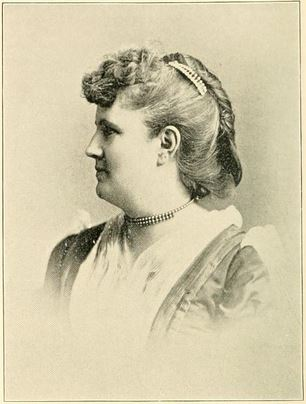
Mrs Mary Tarsney (née Behan)

Tarsney married Mary Behan, a native of Michigan. Although the couple had seven children, none lived to the age of adulthood.

In 1888, Tarsney was elected as a Democrat from Missouri's 5th congressional district to the 51st United States Congress. He was subsequently re-elected to the 52nd and 53rd Congresses, serving from March 4, 1889, to March 3, 1895. He was chairman of the Committee on Labor in the 52nd Congress. He presented credentials as a member-elect to the 54th Congress and served from March 4, 1895, to February 27, 1896, when he was succeeded by Robert T. Van Horn, who had contested his election.

Tarsney was appointed by U.S. President Grover Cleveland to serve as an associate justice of the Supreme Court of Oklahoma Territory in 1896 where he replaced Justice John H. Burford. The position necessitated a move to Guthrie, Oklahoma, the then capital of the Oklahoma Territory. He served as an Associate Justice until 1899 before returning to practice law in Kansas City.

Tarsney died on September 4, 1920.

Tarsney is the namesake of the community of Tarsney, Missouri.

== Tarsney Act ==
One of Tarsney's most long-lasting contributions was the Tarsney Act, which permitted private architects to design federal buildings after being selected in a competition under the supervision of the Supervising Architect of the United States Treasury. Competitions were held for the Alexander Hamilton U.S. Custom House, Ellis Island, James Farley Post Office, Cleveland Federal Building, U.S. Post Office and Courthouse in Baltimore, Maryland, and U.S. Customhouse in San Francisco, California (which are all now on the National Register of Historic Places) among others. The competitions were met with enthusiasm by the architect community but were also marred by scandal as when Supervisory Architect James Knox Taylor picked Cass Gilbert for the New York Customs job, as Taylor and Gilbert had both been members of the Gilbert & Taylor architecture firm in Saint Paul, Minnesota. In 1913, the act was repealed.

U.S. House of Representatives
Preceded by William Warner	United States Representative for the 5th congressional district of Missouri; 1889–1896	Succeeded by Robert T. Van Horn
