= 1892 Ecuadorian presidential election =

- 1892
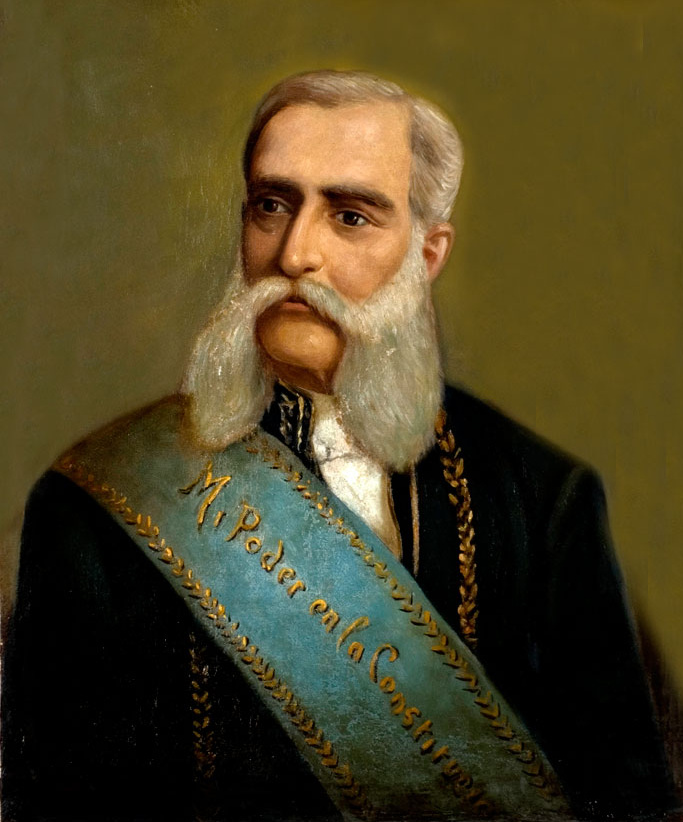

Nominee	Luis Cordero Crespo	Camilo Ponce Ortiz
Party	Progressive	PC
Popular vote	36,557	26,321
Percentage	58.14%	41.86%
President before election
Antonio Flores Jijón
Elected President
Luis Cordero Crespo

Presidential elections were held in Ecuador in 1892. The result was a victory for Luis Cordero Crespo of the Progressive Party, who received 58% of the vote. He took office on 1 September.

== Results ==
Candidate	Party	Votes	%
Luis Cordero Crespo	Progressive Party	36,557	58.14
Camilo Ponce Ortiz	Conservative Party	26,321	41.86
Total		62,878	100.00
Source: TSE
