= 1892 Wisconsin lieutenant gubernatorial election =

- November 8, 1892
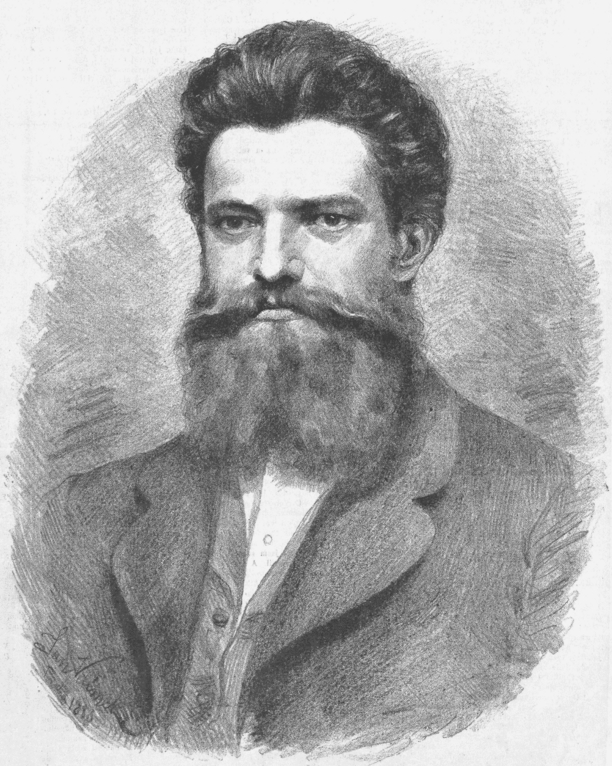

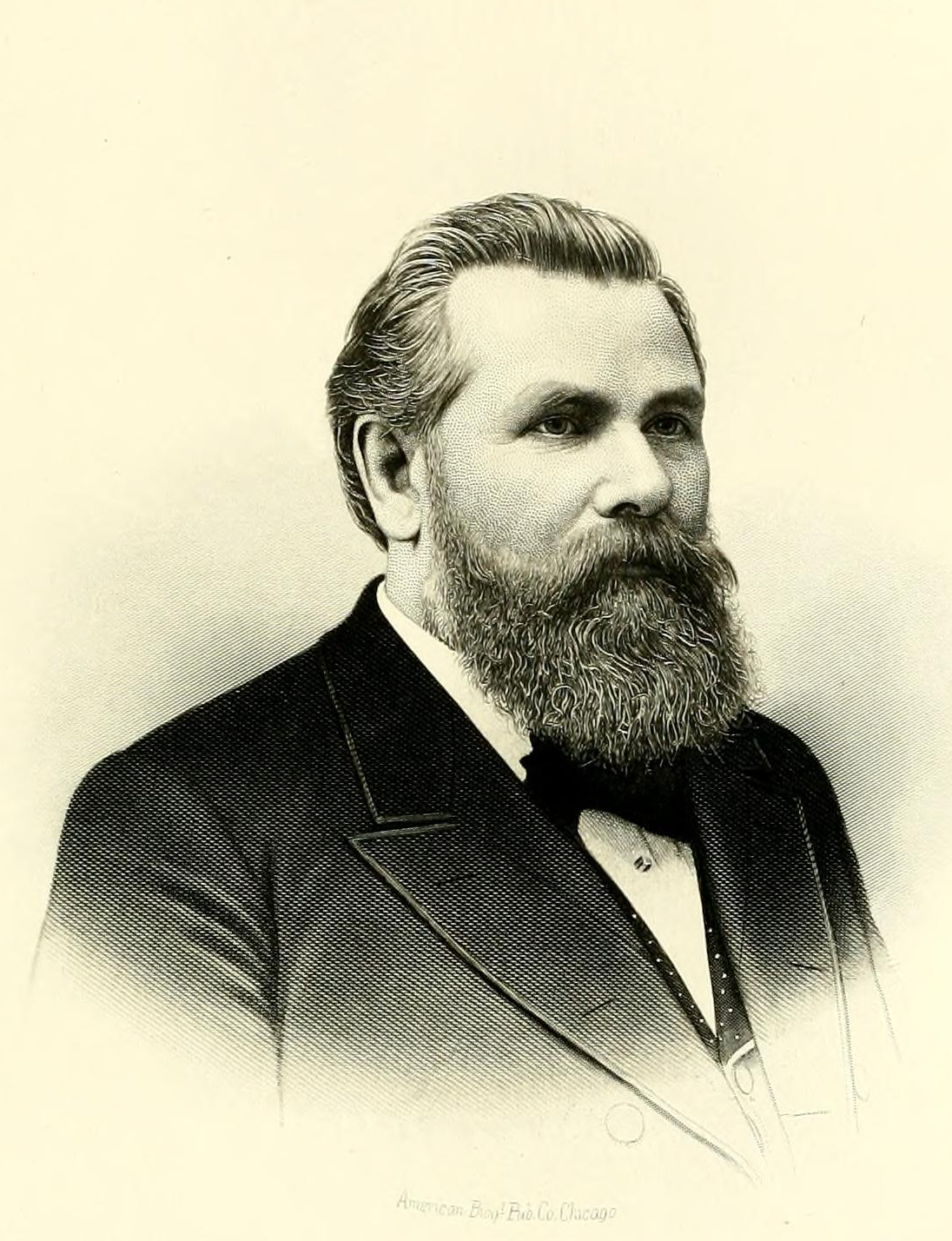
Nominee	Charles Jonas	John C. Koch
Party	Democratic	Republican
Popular vote	176,860	170,097
Percentage	47.78%	45.96%
Lieutenant Governor before election
Charles Jonas
Democratic
Elected Lieutenant Governor
Charles Jonas
Democratic

The 1892 Wisconsin lieutenant gubernatorial election was held on November 8, 1892, in order to elect the lieutenant governor of Wisconsin. Incumbent Democratic lieutenant governor Charles Jonas defeated Republican nominee John C. Koch, Prohibition nominee Gilbert Shepard and People's nominee Martin Pattison.

== General election ==
On election day, November 8, 1892, incumbent Democratic lieutenant governor Charles Jonas won re-election by a margin of 6,763 votes against his foremost opponent Republican nominee John C. Koch, thereby retaining Democratic control over the office of lieutenant governor. Jonas was sworn in for his second term on January 2, 1893.

=== Results ===
Wisconsin lieutenant gubernatorial election, 1892
Party	Candidate	Votes	%
Democratic	Charles Jonas (incumbent)	176,860	47.78
Republican	John C. Koch	170,097	45.96
Prohibition	Gilbert Shepard	13,122	3.55
Populist	Martin Pattison	9,885	2.67
	Scattering	161	0.04
Total votes		370,125	100.00
Democratic hold			
