= 1892 Arkansas gubernatorial election =

- September 5, 1892
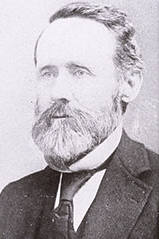

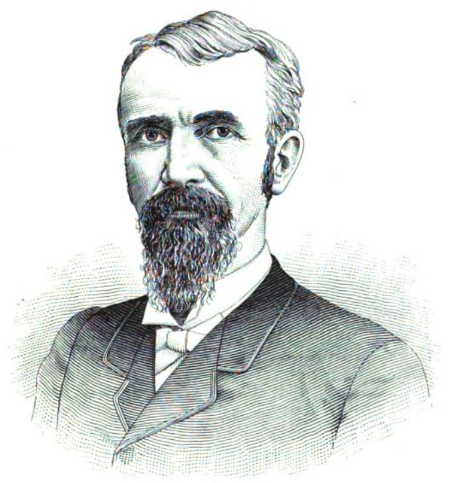

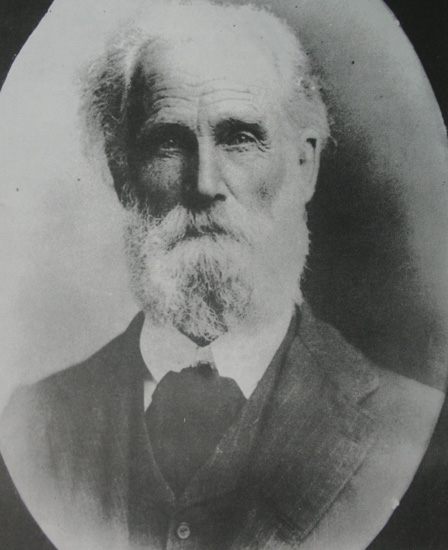
Nominee	William Meade Fishback	William G. Whipple	Jacob P. Carnahan
Party	Democratic	Republican	Populist
Popular vote	90,115	33,644	31,117
Percentage	57.70%	21.54%	19.92%
- County results Fishback: 30–40% 40–50% 50–60% 60–70% 70–80% 80–90% Whipple: 40–50% 50–60% 60–70% Carnahan: 40–50% 50–60%
Governor before election
James Philip Eagle
Democratic
Elected Governor
William Meade Fishback
Democratic

The 1892 Arkansas gubernatorial election was held on September 5, 1892.

Incumbent Democratic Governor James Philip Eagle did not stand for re-election.

Democratic nominee William Meade Fishback defeated Republican nominee William G. Whipple and Populist nominee Jacob P. Carnahan with 57.70% of the vote.

== General election ==
=== Candidates ===
- William Meade Fishback, Democratic, former member of the Arkansas House of Representatives
- William G. Whipple, Republican, former mayor of Little Rock
- Jacob P. Carnahan, Populist, teacher
- William J. Nelson, Prohibition

=== Results ===
1892 Arkansas gubernatorial election (Note: Most 20th Century sources give the result as Fishback 90,115, Whipple 33,634, Carnahan 31,116, Nelson 1,320.)
Party	Candidate	Votes	%	±%
Democratic	William Meade Fishback	90,115	57.70%	+2.19%
Republican	William G. Whipple	33,644	21.54%	−22.95%
Populist	Jacob P. Carnahan	31,117	19.92%	
Prohibition	William J. Nelson	1,310	0.84%	
Majority		56,471	36.16%	
Turnout		156,186		
Democratic hold		Swing		
