= William Meade Fishback =

17th governor of Arkansas

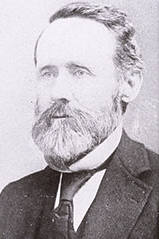

17th Governor of Arkansas
- In office January 14, 1893 – January 18, 1895
- Preceded by: James Philip Eagle
- Succeeded by: James Paul Clarke

Personal details
- Born: November 5, 1831 Jeffersonton, Virginia, U.S.
- Died: February 9, 1903 (aged 71) Fort Smith, Arkansas, U.S.
- Party: Democratic

William Meade Fishback (November 5, 1831 – February 9, 1903) was a lawyer and politician who served as the 17th governor of Arkansas from 1893 to 1895 and U.S. Senator-elect for Arkansas. He also served in the Arkansas House of Representatives. He was a Unionist and served in the Union Army. He was a delegate at Arkansas' 1874 Constitutional Convention.

== Early life ==
Fishback was born in Jeffersonton, Virginia, in Culpeper County, Virginia, the son of Sophia Ann (Yates) and Frederick Fishback. He is third cousins with James Sevier Conway. He graduated with a law degree from the University of Virginia School of Law in 1855.

== Career ==
In 1857, Fishback moved to Springfield, Illinois, where he was admitted to the bar and briefly practiced law. During his time in Springfield, he came into contact with Abraham Lincoln and handled foreclosure proceedings for his firm, Lincoln & Herndon.

He moved to the frontier region of Sebastian County, Arkansas in 1858 and began practicing in Greenwood shortly thereafter. In 1861, Fishback was elected to the Arkansas Secession Convention as a pro-Union delegate. After the convention voted in favor of secession, he fled to Missouri and took an oath of allegiance to the Union.

Fishback followed the Union Army back into Arkansas in 1863 and was appointed Colonel of the 4th Arkansas Cavalry (USA). He raised 900 soldiers, although his efforts to restore Arkansas into the Union prevented him from leading the regiment. Upon his return to Arkansas, Fishback established a pro-Union newspaper called The Unconditional Union, urging voters to ratify the new state constitution that abolished slavery and repudiated secession. In December 1863, he represented 17-year-old David Owen Dodd, who was convicted of spying.

Fishback and Elisha Baxter were selected to represent Arkansas in the United States Senate in 1864, but their admission was blocked in February 1865 as Arkansas had not yet been readmitted into the Union. After serving as a federal treasury agent following the conclusion of the Civil War, Fishback returned to Sebastian County, reopened a law office in Fort Smith and spent the next decade building his practice into one of the most prosperous in western Arkansas.

Composite photograph of 1885 Arkansas House of Representatives members and officers including W. M. Fishback (#95, bottom row fourth from the left) and several African Americans

Fishback was a delegate to the 1874 Arkansas Constitutional Convention. He served as a member of the Arkansas House of Representatives from 1871 to 1881. In 1885 he represented Sebastian County. His occupation was listed as farmer and his post office at Fort Smith. He introduced what came to be known as the "Fishback Amendment", now known as Amendment 1 (codified as Article 20) of the Arkansas Constitution. This amendment prohibited the state authorities from paying the Holford railroad aid and levee bonds. Failure to pay the Holford debt created credit problems for the state that lasted well into the 20th century.

On September 5, 1892, Fishback was elected Governor of Arkansas. Fishback's administration focused on changing the national image of the state. During his term, the St. Francis River levee district was formed. Fishback served as governor until 1895 when he left public office and worked to attract business to the state.

== Death ==
Fishback died of a stroke. He is buried at Oak Cemetery in Fort Smith, Arkansas.

Party political offices
| Preceded by James Philip Eagle | Democratic nominee for Governor of Arkansas; 1892 | Succeeded by James Paul Clarke |
Political offices
| Preceded by James Philip Eagle | Governor of Arkansas; 1893–1895 | Succeeded by James Paul Clarke |
