= David M. Furches =

American judge (1832–1908)

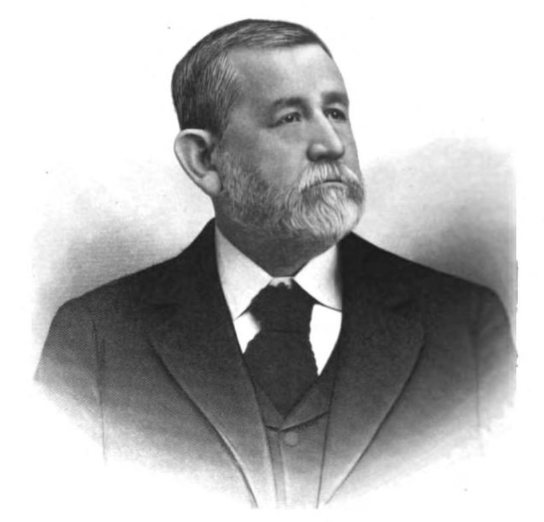

Chief Justice of the North Carolina Supreme Court
- In office 1901–1903
- Preceded by: William T. Faircloth
- Succeeded by: Walter Clark

Justice of the North Carolina Supreme Court
- In office 1895–1901

Personal details
- Born: David Moffatt Furches; April 2, 1832; Davie County, North Carolina, U.S.
- Died: June 7, 1908 (aged 76); Statesville, North Carolina, U.S.
- Political party: Republican
- Spouses: Eliza Bingham; Lula Corpening
- Education: Richmond Hill Law School
- Occupation: Jurist, politician

David Moffatt Furches (April 2, 1832 – June 7, 1908) was an American politician and jurist who served as an associate justice (1895–1901) and chief justice (1901–1903) of the North Carolina Supreme Court.

== Biography ==
David M. Furches was born in Davie County, North Carolina in 1832.

He read law under Chief Justice Richmond M. Pearson at the Richmond Hill Law School and served in the state constitutional convention in 1865, representing Davie County. Furches practiced law in Davie and later Iredell County, North Carolina and became a prominent member of the North Carolina Republican Party. In 1875, he was appointed a state superior court judge, a position he held until 1879. He lost two races for the United States House of Representatives, one in 1872 and the other in 1880, and was his party's nominee for Governor of North Carolina in 1892, losing to Elias Carr. In 1894, Furches was elected to the state Supreme Court. In 1900 the justices, by a vote of four to one, declared unconstitutional important legislation enacted by the North Carolina General Assembly of 1899-1900, which was controlled by Democrats. When Chief Justice William T. Faircloth died in December 1900, fellow Republican Gov. Daniel L. Russell appointed Furches to the post.

He married twice, to Eliza Bingham and Lula Corpening.

He died at his home in Statesville on June 7, 1908.

== Impeachment ==
On February 18, 1901, the North Carolina House of Representatives (again controlled by Democrats) impeached Furches and Associate Justice Robert M. Douglas (who was also a Republican). The charges involved an obscure case in which the justices ordered the North Carolina State Treasurer to pay the salary of the state Shell Fish Inspector (a Republican), against the wishes of the General Assembly. A two-thirds majority was required to remove the justices, and none of the five articles of impeachment attracted even a majority of the North Carolina Senate in his impeachment trial. Yes-no votes on the five articles were 23-27, 24-26, 24-26, 25-25 and 16-34. Among the lawyers defending Furches in the impeachment proceedings was former Gov. Thomas J. Jarvis, a Democrat.

Furches lost in his bid for election as chief justice in 1902. As of 1906, he was a member of the state Republican Party's executive committee.

Party political offices
Preceded by Oliver H. Dockery	Republican nominee for Governor of North Carolina; 1892	Succeeded by Daniel Lindsay Russell
Legal offices
Preceded by William T. Faircloth	Chief Justice of North Carolina Supreme Court; 1901–1903	Succeeded by Walter Clark
