= 1892 North Carolina gubernatorial election =

- November 8, 1892
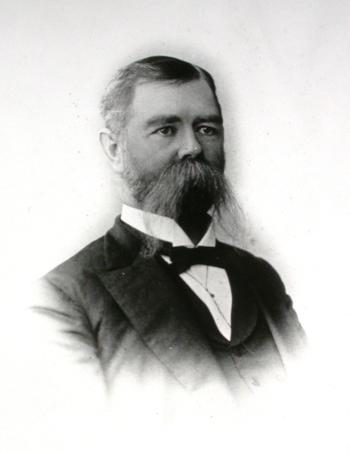

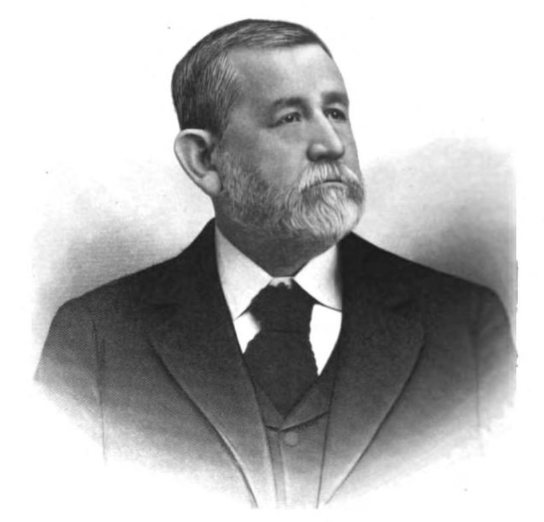

Nominee	Elias Carr	David M. Furches	Wyatt P. Exum
Party	Democratic	Republican	Populist
Popular vote	135,327	94,681	47,747
Percentage	48.30%	33.79%	17.04%
- County results Carr: 30–40% 40–50% 50–60% 60–70% 70–80% Furches: 30–40% 40–50% 50–60% 60–70% Exum: 30–40% 40–50% 50–60% Tie: 40–50%
Governor before election
Thomas Michael Holt
Democratic
Elected Governor
Elias Carr
Democratic

The 1892 North Carolina gubernatorial election was held on November 8, 1892. Democratic nominee Elias Carr defeated Republican nominee David M. Furches with 48.3% of the vote. Harry Skinner unsuccessfully ran for the Populist nomination.

== Democratic convention ==
The Democratic convention was held on May 18, 1892.

=== Candidates ===
- Elias Carr, President of the North Carolina Farmer's Association
- Thomas Michael Holt, incumbent Governor
- George W. Sanderlin, Auditor of North Carolina
- Julian Carr, businessman
- Sydenham Benoni Alexander, U.S. Representative
- Thomas Jordan Jarvis, former Governor

=== Results ===
The results of the balloting were as follows:

	Gubernatorial Ballot					
	1st	2nd	3rd	4th	5th	6th
E. Carr	112	123.6	127	170	344	627.3
J. S. Carr	157	157.8	157.6	137	227	243.9
Holt	407	402.67	385.5	371	295	107.8
Sanderlin	283	306.8	332.4	320	136	27
Jarvis	8		3.3	9		
Alexander	14					

Democratic gubernatorial nomination, 6th ballot
Party	Candidate	Votes	%
Democratic	Elias Carr	627.3	62.36
Democratic	Julian Carr	243.9	24.24
Democratic	Thomas Michael Holt	107.8	10.72
Democratic	George W. Sanderlin	27	2.68
Total votes		1,006	100.00

== General election ==
=== Candidates ===
Major party candidates

- Elias Carr, Democratic
- David M. Furches, Republican

Other candidates

- Wyatt P. Exum, People's
- James M. Templeton, Prohibition

=== Results ===
1892 North Carolina gubernatorial election
Party	Candidate	Votes	%	±%
Democratic	Elias Carr	135,327	48.30%	
Republican	David M. Furches	94,681	33.79%	
Populist	Wyatt P. Exum	47,747	17.04%	
Prohibition	James M. Templeton	2,448	0.87%	
Majority		40,646		
Turnout				
Democratic hold		Swing		
