= 1892 Missouri gubernatorial election =

- November 8, 1892
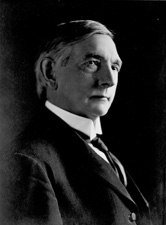

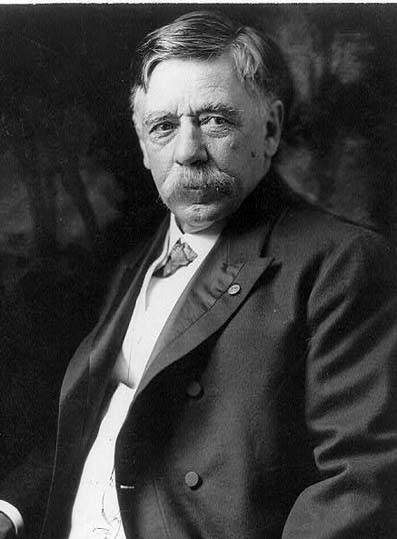

Nominee	William J. Stone	William Warner	Leverett Leonard
Party	Democratic	Republican	Populist
Popular vote	265,044	235,383	37,262
Percentage	48.98%	43.50%	6.89%
- County results Stone: 30–40% 40–50% 50–60% 60–70% 70–80% 80–90% Warner: 40–50% 50–60% 60–70% 70–80%
Governor before election
David R. Francis
Democratic
Elected Governor
William J. Stone
Democratic

The 1892 Missouri gubernatorial election was held on November 8, 1892, and resulted in a victory for the Democratic nominee, former Congressman William J. Stone, over the Republican candidate former Congressman William Warner, Populist candidate Leverett Leonard, and Prohibition candidate John Sobieski.

== Results ==
1892 gubernatorial election, Missouri
Party	Candidate	Votes	%	±%
Democratic	William J. Stone	265,044	48.98	−0.38
Republican	William Warner	235,383	43.50	−3.31
Populist	Leverett Leonard	37,262	6.89	+6.89
Prohibition	John Sobieski	3,393	0.63	−0.22
Majority		29,661	5.48	+2.97
Turnout		541,082	20.20	
Democratic hold		Swing		
