= Mary Hilliard Hinton =

American anti-suffragist and white supremacist (1869–1961)

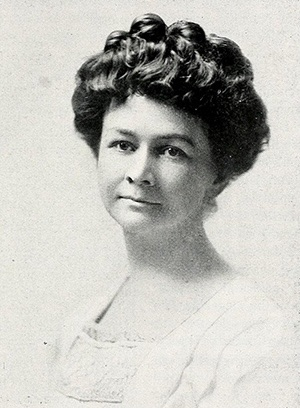
- Hinton in 1914

North Carolina State Regent of the Daughters of the American Revolution

Personal details
- Born: June 7, 1869 Midway Plantation, Wake County, North Carolina, U.S.
- Died: January 6, 1961 (aged 91) Knightdale, North Carolina, U.S.
- Resting place: Hinton Cemetery, The Oaks Plantation, Knightdale
- Parent(s): David Hinton; Mary Boddie Carr
- Relatives: Elias Carr (uncle); Eleanor Kearny Carr (aunt); Julian Carr (cousin)
- Education: Saint Mary's School; Peace Institute
- Occupation: painter, anti-suffragist activist, historian

Mary Hilliard Hinton (June 7, 1869 – January 6, 1961) was an American painter, historian, clubwoman, and political activist. She was a leader in North Carolina's anti-suffragist movement and an outspoken white supremacist, co-founding and running North Carolina's branches of the States Rights Defense League and the Southern Rejection League. A prominent clubwoman, Hinton was active in the Daughters of the American Revolution, the United Daughters of the Confederacy, the Colonial Dames of America, and the National Society of the Colonial Dames of America; serving as a booklet editor, artist, registrar, and state regent for the North Carolina Society of the Daughters of the American Revolution.

== Biography ==
Hinton was born on June 7, 1869, at Midway Plantation, her family's plantation in Wake County (now part of Knightdale). She was the daughter of Major David Hinton, a planter, Confederate officer and alumnus of the University of North Carolina, and his wife Mary Boddie Carr, a sister of Governor Elias Carr of Bracebridge Hall in Tarboro and cousin of industrialist Julian Carr of Poplar Hill Plantation in Hillsborough and Somerset Villa in Durham. Her paternal grandfather, Charles Lewis Hinton, served as the North Carolina State Treasurer. Her father's family also owned the nearby River Plantation, The Oaks Plantation, Beaver Dam Plantation, Clay Hill Plantation, Square Brick Plantation, and Panther Rock Plantation. She was a descendant of Colonel John Hinton, who served in the Wake County Regiment of the Hillsborough District Brigade during the American Revolutionary War. Through her mother, she was a relative of the Boddie family, who owned Rose Hill Plantation in Nash County.

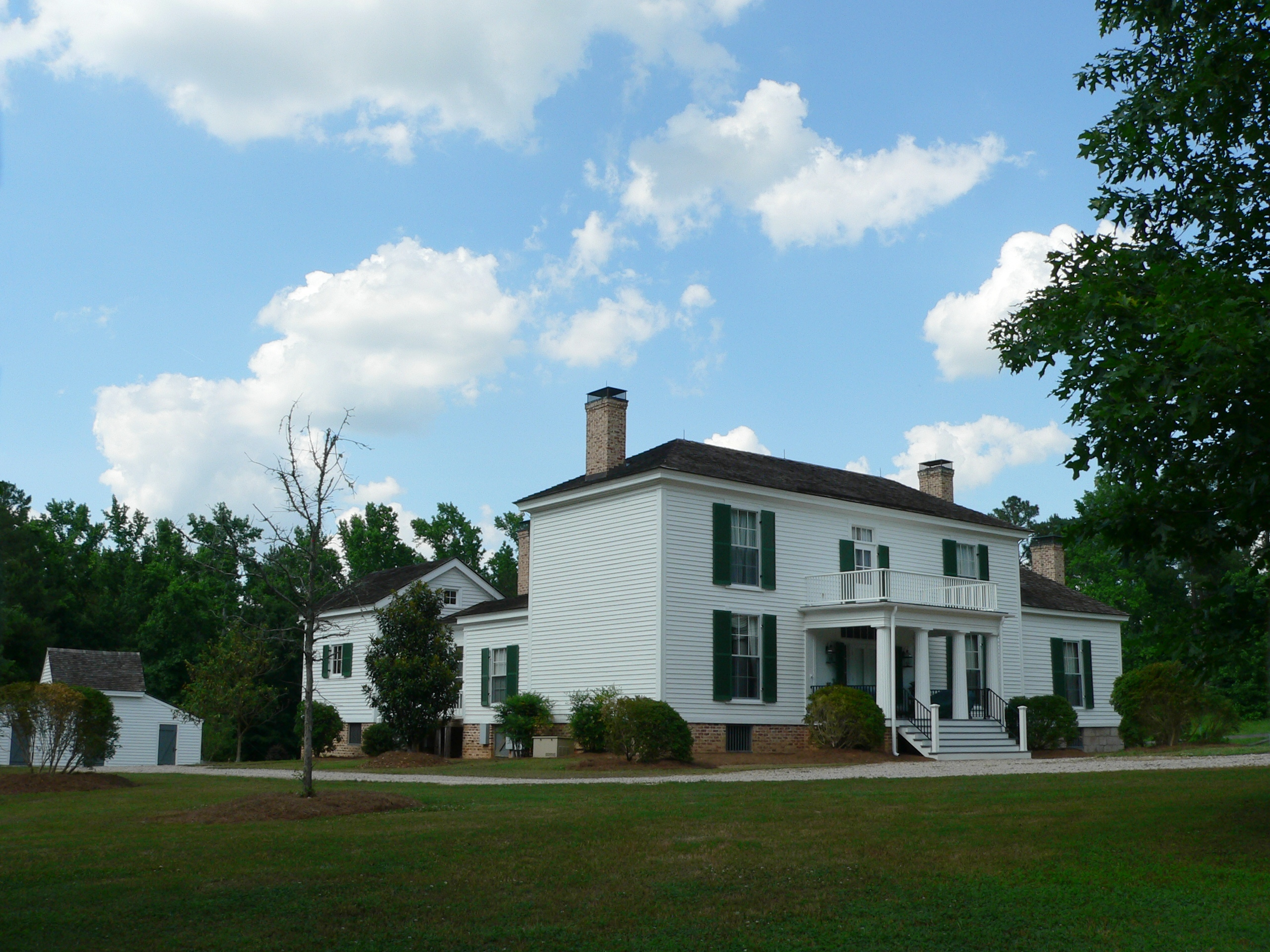
Midway Plantation, Hinton's family home in Wake County

She was educated at Saint Mary's School and the Peace Institute. Hinton studied portraiture under Ruth Huntington Moore, an artist who served on the faculty at Peace Institute.

Hinton was an active clubwoman and was a member of multiple lineage societies, including the Daughters of the American Revolution, the National Society of the Colonial Dames of America, the Colonial Dames of America, the United Daughters of the Confederacy, the Order of the Crown of America, and the Daughters of the Barons of Runnemede. She held the positions of registrar, state regent, and heraldic artist for the North Carolina Society of the Daughters of the American Revolution and was an editor of the society's North Carolina Booklet, where she would write about North Carolinian history. Hinton also served as the chairwoman of the art department of the Raleigh Woman's Club, and was a member of the Association for the Preservation of Virginia Antiquities, North Carolina Literary and Historical Association, the Audubon Society, and the National Geographic Society.

She was a leading worker in the Anti-Suffrage League, petitioning and actively working against the Women's suffrage movement in the United States, disenfranchising African-Americans, and upholding white supremacy. Hinton argued against enfranchising women and co-organized two of North Carolina's anti-suffrage associations, the States Rights Defense League and the Southern Rejection League. She also promoted the Lost Cause of the Confederacy, romanticized slavery, and glorified the Antebellum South in her writings, particularly in her article titled A Type of the Old South.

Hinton was a practicing Episcopalian and a parishioner at Christ Episcopal Church in Raleigh.

She died at Midway Plantation on January 6, 1961, and is buried in the Hinton family cemetery at The Oaks Plantation.
