= Neuse River Trail =

Greenway trail in North Carolina, US

Neuse River Greenway
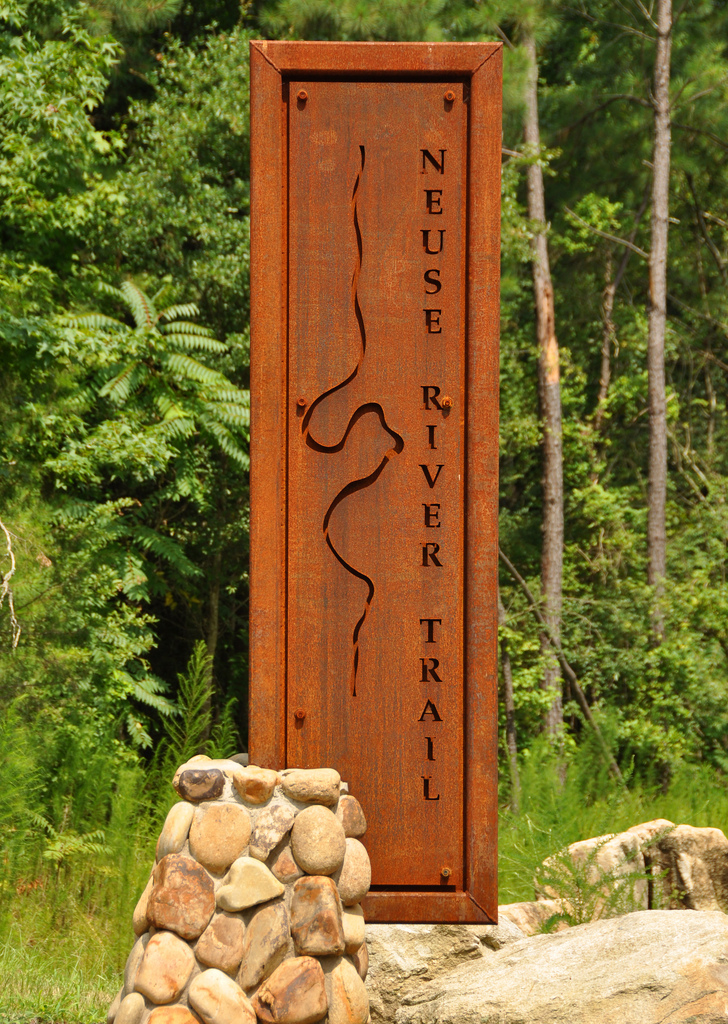
- Length: 34.5 mi (55.5 km)
- Location: North Carolina
- Trailheads: Falls Lake Dam in North Raleigh to Legend Park in Clayton
- Use: Multi-use
- Difficulty: Easy
- Season: Year-round
- Sights: Neuse River, wetland, Milburnie Dam
- Hazards: Snakes common to central North Carolina

The Neuse River Trail is a 34.5-mile (55.5 km) long paved greenway located in the Raleigh area of North Carolina, running along the banks of the Neuse River from Falls Lake Dam to the town of Clayton. The route passes through the jurisdictions of Raleigh, Wake Forest, Knightdale, and Clayton in Wake and Johnston counties. The Neuse River Greenway trail is part of the Capital Area Greenway system as well as the Mountains-to-Sea Trail that crosses North Carolina from the Great Smoky Mountains to the Outer Banks. Open to both cyclists and pedestrians, the Neuse River Trail is the longest greenway trail in North Carolina and the longest paved trail between northern Virginia and western Georgia.

The Neuse River Trail is a part of the East Coast Greenway, a 3,000 mile long system of trails connecting Maine to Florida.

== Route ==
The Neuse River Trail is split into seven sections, from North to South:

- Falls Lake Dam to Horseshoe Farm Park
- Horseshoe Farm Park to Buffaloe Road Athletic Park
- Buffaloe Road Athletic Park to Milburnie Dam
- Milburnie Dam to Anderson Point Park
- Anderson Point Park to Auburn Knightdale Road
- Auburn Knightdale Road to County Line
- County Line to Legend Park in Clayton

== Bridges ==
The Neuse River Trail is notable for its pedestrian bridges that span the Neuse River. Two suspension bridges span the river; one at Skycrest Road and the other at Louisburg Road. Designed by Stewart Inc., the two bridges are 275-foot (84 m) long, 12-foot (3.7 m) wide, feature concrete decks and 45-foot (14 m) tall steel towers. Other bridges over the Neuse River feature a steel truss design, such as the Milburnie Dam bridge. Bridges over wetland and creeks are constructed out of wood.

== History ==
In 1976, the Raleigh City Council adopted the Capital Area Greenway System plan of which the Neuse River Corridor was a spine. In 1996, the Raleigh completed the Neuse River Regional Park Master Plan.

The major recommendations included in the Neuse River Plan:

- The preservation of the full width of the floodplain along the Neuse River. The plan calls for the corridor to include the 100 year flood plan or extend 150-foot (46 m)) from the riverbank, whichever is greater.
- The development of a trail system within the corridor with one 10-foot (3.0 m) wide asphalt trail extending the entire length;
- The development of adjoining upland park areas at a spacing of 2 to 3 miles to provide various recreation opportunities and access points to the river and trail.

When Raleigh approved the Neuse River Regional Park Master Plan in 1996 only a 3.5-mile (5.6 km) stretch of trail existed along the Hedingham neighborhood. Since then the city has acquired over 2,000 acres of land along the Neuse river for use as greenway as well as nine parcels of land for future parks.

In 2003, Raleigh voters approved a Parks and Recreation Bond Referendum that included $1.474 million for the development of the Upper Neuse Trail. In addition to the city's funding, Federal Enhancement funds of $893,000 and American Reinvestment and Recovery Act funds of $3.25 million were acquired by the Raleigh.

In November 2011, the first 6.5-mile (10.5 km) stretch of the Upper Neuse River Greenway opened from Falls Lake Dam to the WRAL Soccer Center. In April 2013, a 20-mile stretch from Horseshoe Farm Park to the Johnston County line officially opened. The last 1-mile (1.6 km) section of the greenway, at the Horseshoe Farm riverbend, was completed in 2014. It is a connector between the Upper Neuse River section and the rest of the greenway.

The town of Clayton's sections of the greenway include the 1.5-mile (2.4 km) Sam's Branch Greenway and the 4-mile (6.4 km) Clayton River Walk on the Neuse. Future plans call for the Greenway to connect with Legend Park and Municipal Park and to eventually extend to Clemmons State Forest - a total of approximately 3-mile (4.8 km). Additional sections will be constructed as funding becomes available.

On October 13, 2022, a spree shooting occurred at and near the greenway. A total of five people were killed, and two others were injured.

== Gallery ==
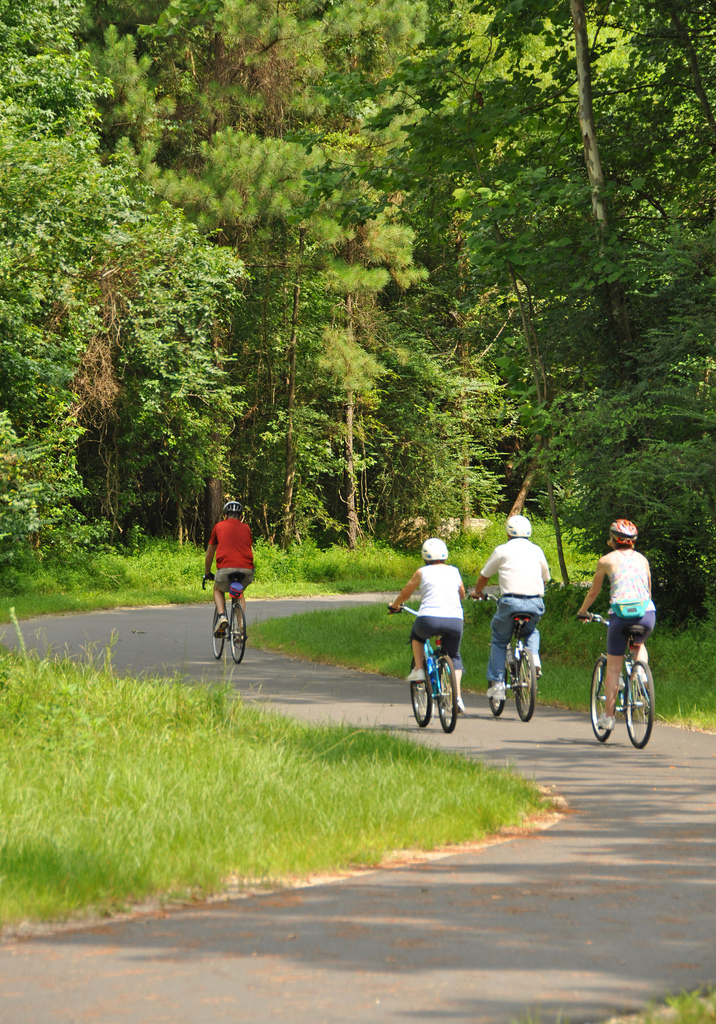
Cyclists on Neuse River Trail

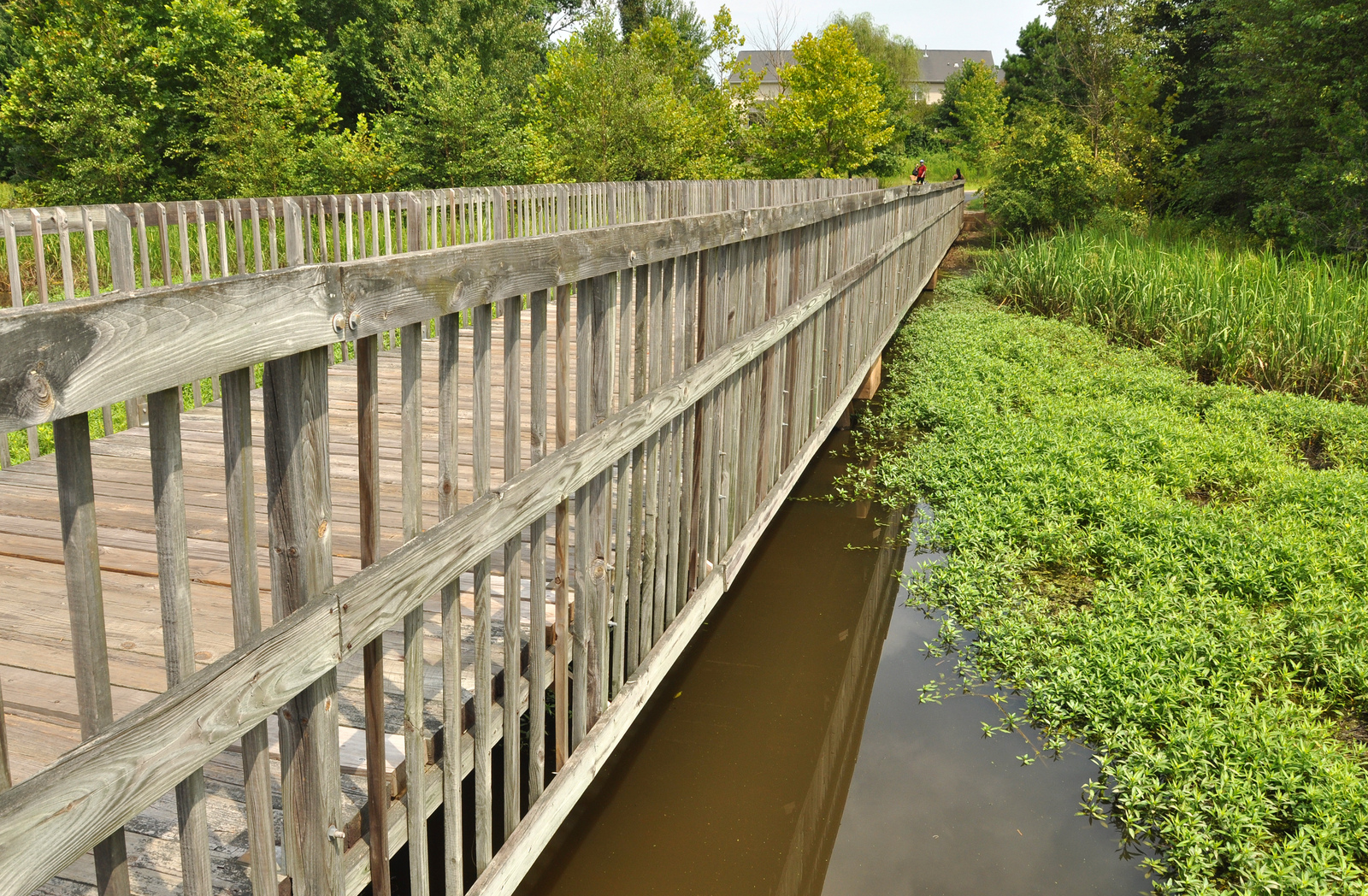
Bridges Lake section

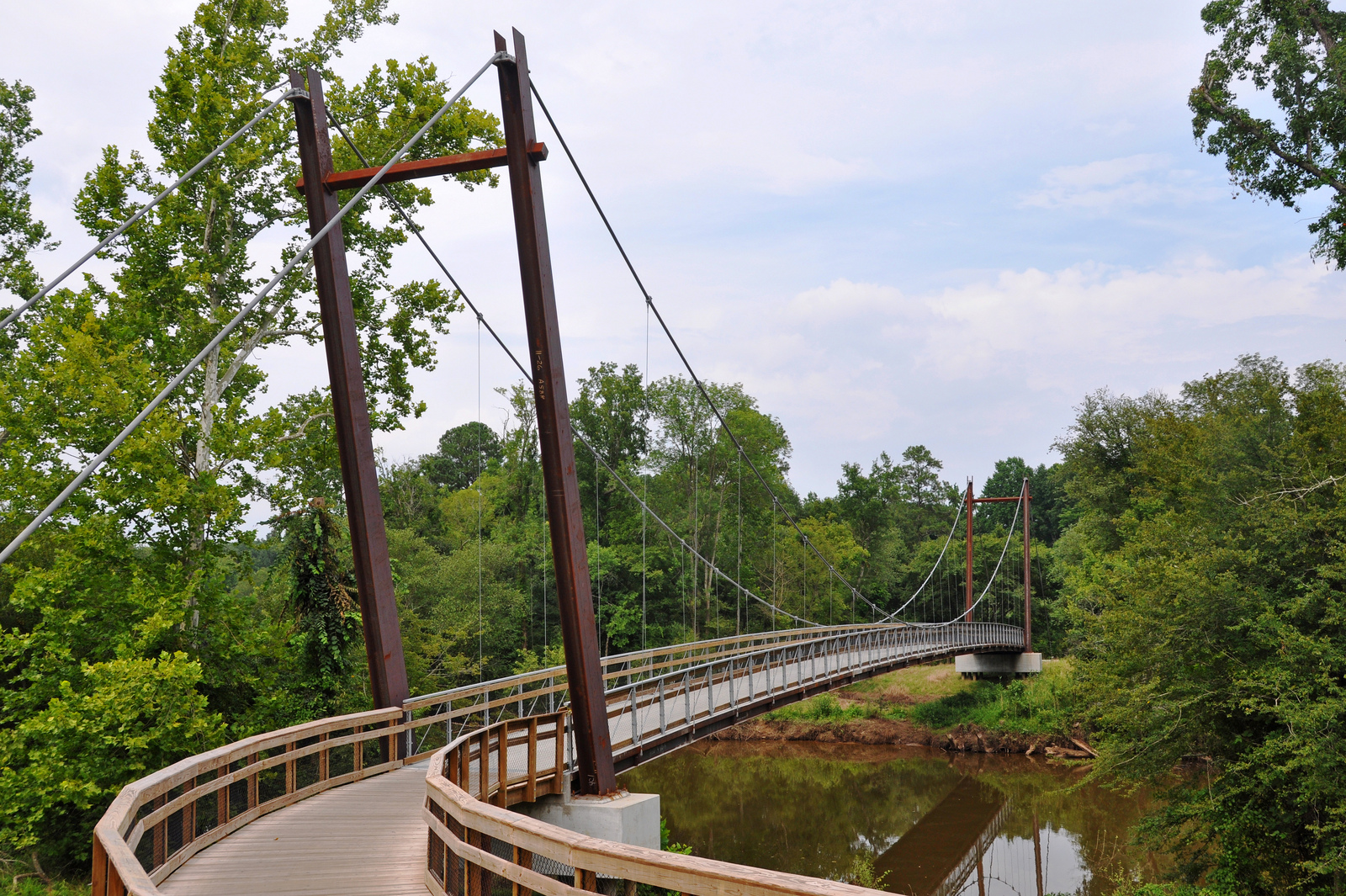
Skycrest suspension bridge

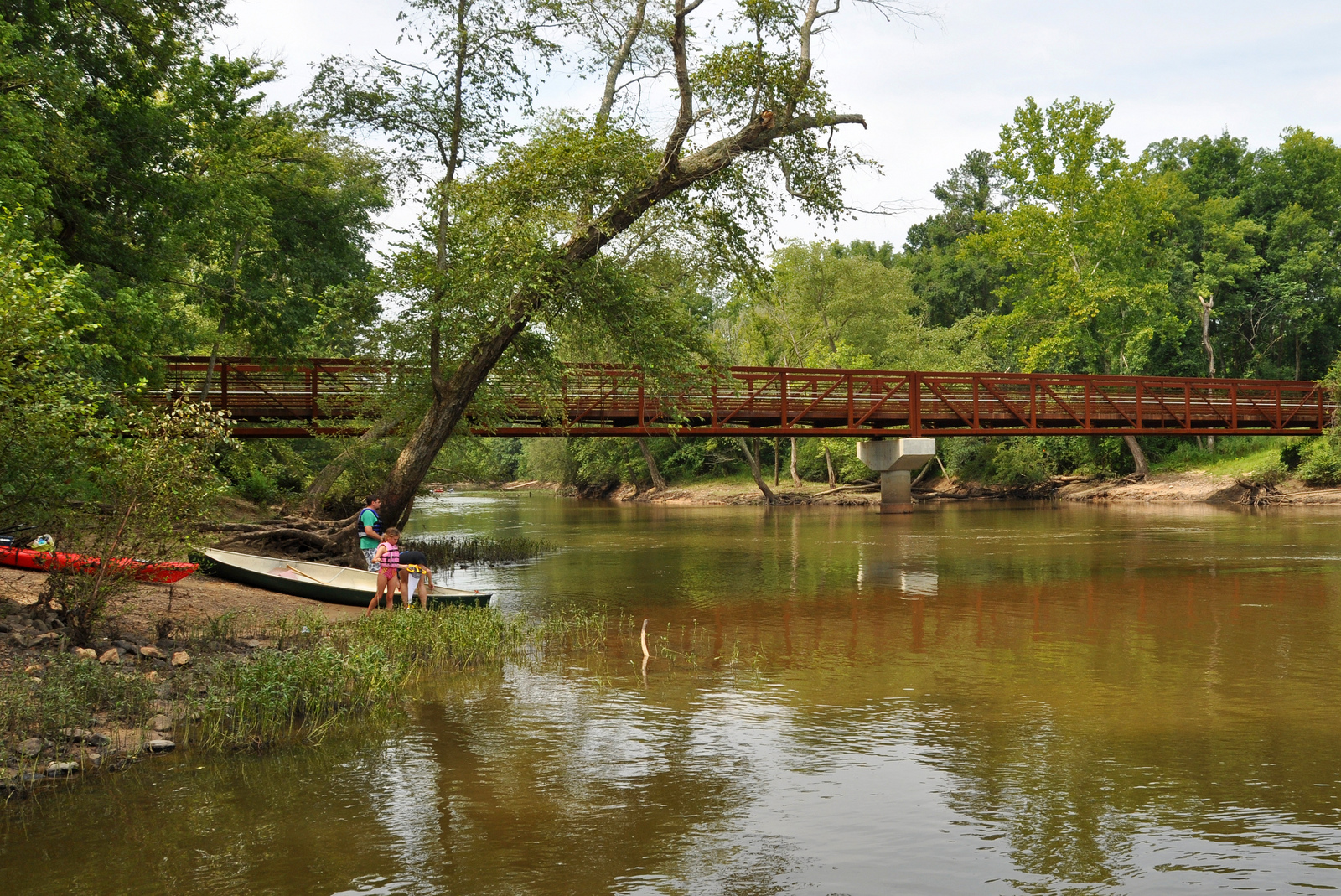
Milburnie Dam bridge

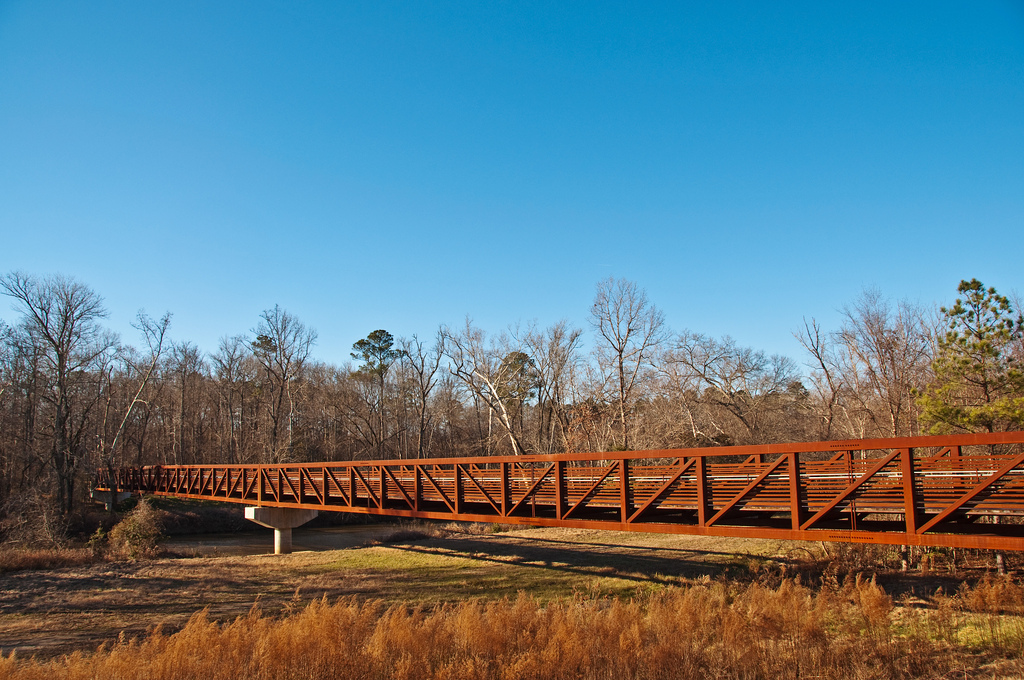
Buffaloe Road Athletic Park bridge

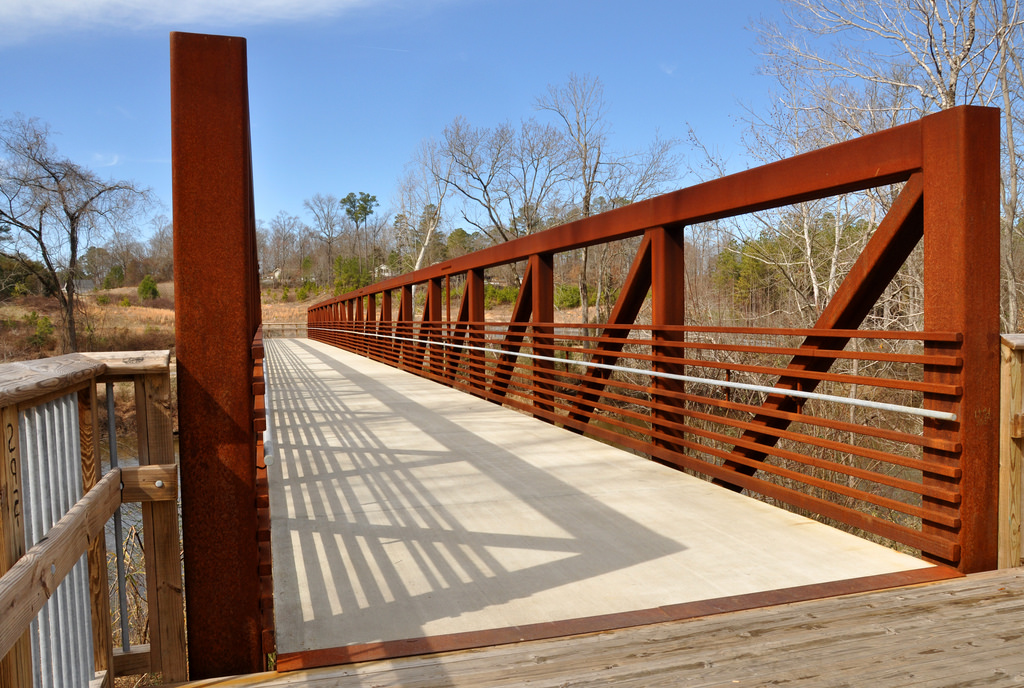
Bridge at Mingo Creek

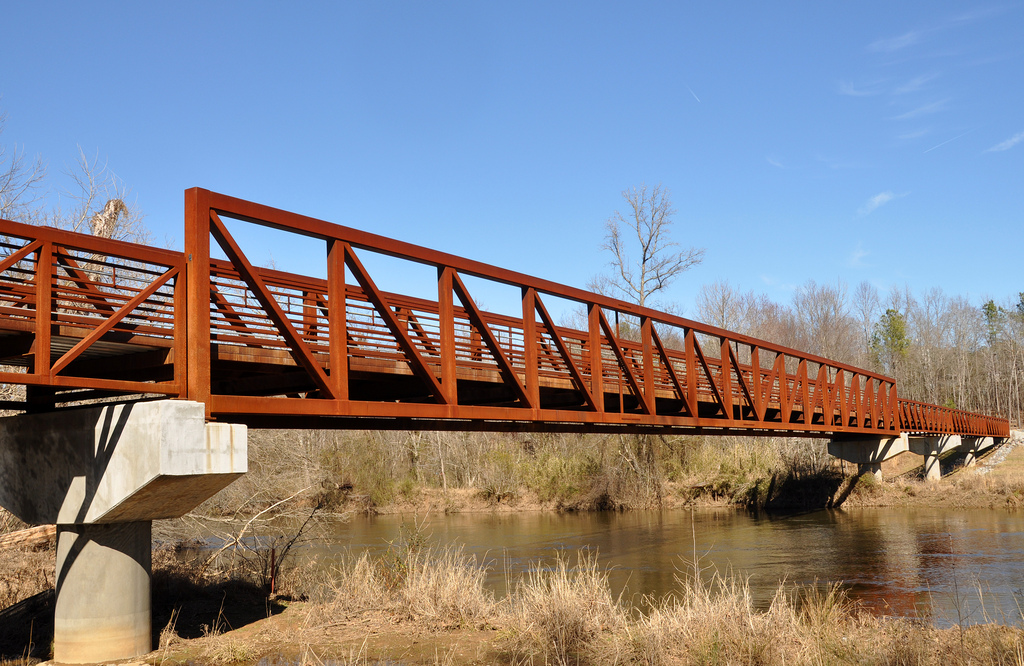
Bridge at Swift Creek

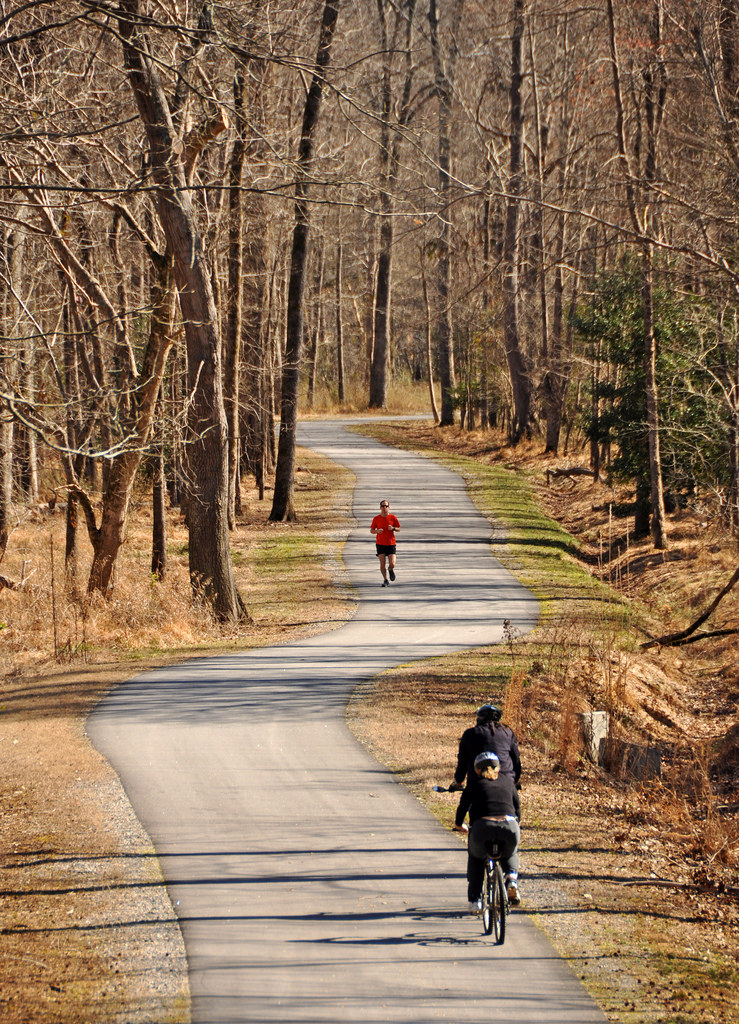
Cyclists and joggers on the greenway

== See also ==
- Neuse River
- Capital Area Greenway
- Mountains-to-Sea Trail
- WRAL Soccer Center
- Cliffs of the Neuse State Park
