= Henry H. and Bettie S. Knight Farm =

Historic farm in North Carolina, United States

- U.S. National Register of Historic Places
- U.S. Historic district
- Location within North Carolina Location within the United States
- Location: US 64, near Knightdale, North Carolina
- Coordinates: 35°48′04″N 78°29′34″W
- Area: 45 acres (18 ha)
- Built: 1905
- Architectural style: Queen Anne
- NRHP reference No.: 87002234
- Added to NRHP: January 12, 1988

Henry H. and Bettie S. Knight Farm is a historic farm and national historic district located near Knightdale, Wake County, North Carolina. The district encompasses six contributing buildings on a family farm located near Knightdale. The farmhouse was built around 1890, and is a 1 1/2-story, Queen Anne style frame dwelling with a cross-gable roof and a series of later additions and alterations. The other contributing buildings are the dairy (c. 1890), storage building (c. 1900), storage shed (c. 1900), and two barns (c. 1890 and c. 1900).

It was listed on the National Register of Historic Places in 1988.
