= Jeanne Milliken Bonds =

American politician and academic

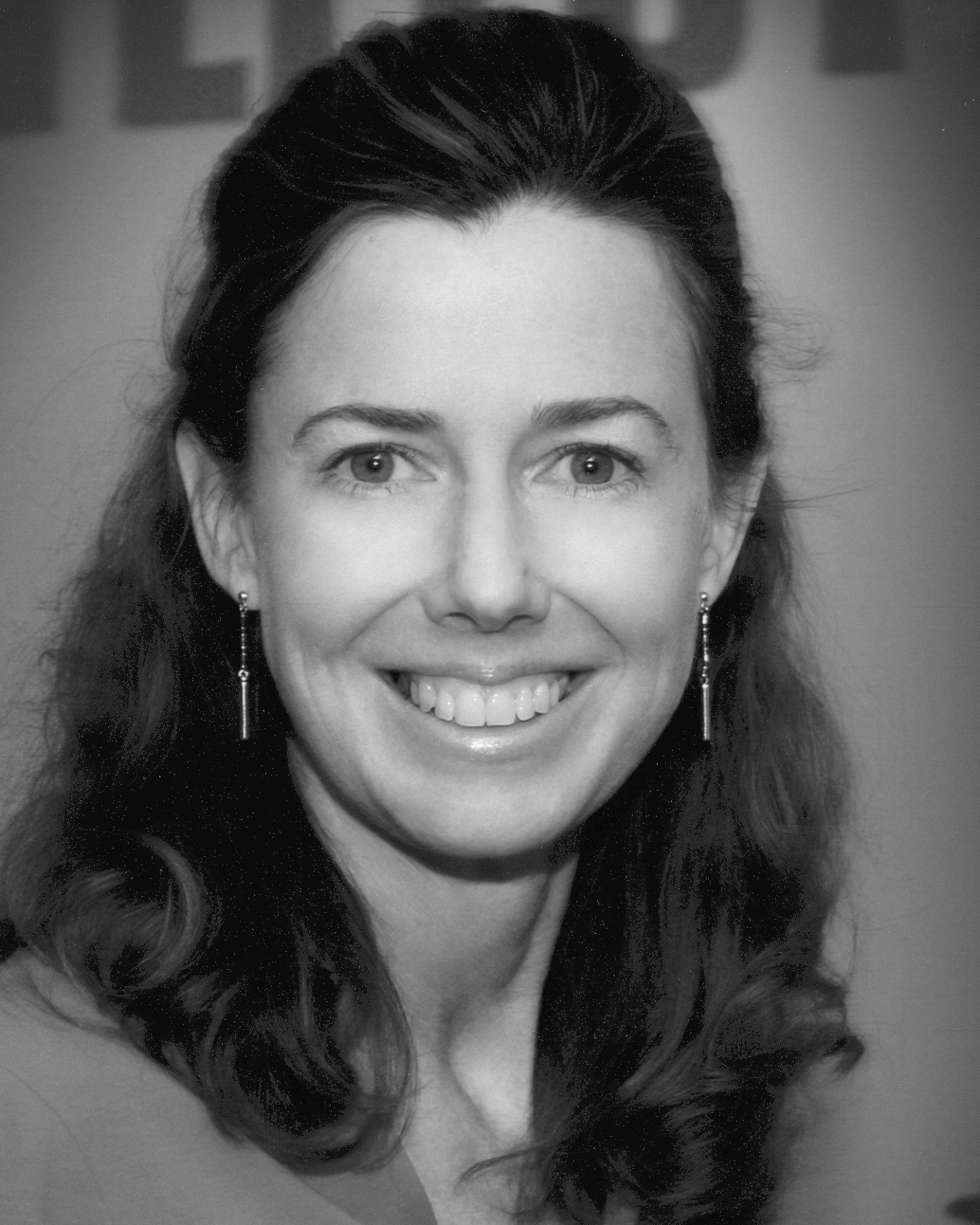
- Milliken Bonds in 2004

Mayor of Knightdale, North Carolina
- In office 2002–2007

Mayor Pro Tempore of Knightdale
- In office 1995–2001

Knightdale Town Councilwoman
- In office 1994–1995

Personal details
- Born: Jeanne Milliken Wilmington, North Carolina, U.S.
- Spouse: Robert Alexander Bonds III
- Education: University of North Carolina at Chapel Hill
- Occupation: politician, professor, consultant, community developer, lobbyist

Jeanne Milliken Bonds is an American politician, lobbyist, consultant, community developer and professor. Milliken Bonds represented the North Carolina Judiciary before the North Carolina General Assembly as the deputy director of the North Carolina Administrative Office of the Courts. She was the first female mayor of Knightdale, North Carolina. Milliken Bonds later served as the Leader of Community Development for the Federal Reserve Bank of Richmond and in the Senior Executive Service with the U.S. Treasury.

== Early life and education ==
Jeanne Milliken Bonds was born in Wilmington, North Carolina to Guy Allen Milliken and Margaret Cathey Milliken. Her family descends from Scottish and Irish colonists who arrived in the Province of Carolina in 1697.

She graduated from John T. Hoggard High School in Wilmington. Milliken Bonds earned a bachelor's degree in economics from the University of North Carolina at Chapel Hill, where she was a member of Kappa Alpha Theta. She later earned a master's degree in public administration from the University of North Carolina at Chapel Hill.

== Career ==
=== Politics and public service ===
Milliken Bonds was appointed to the Town Council of Knightdale, North Carolina in 1994. While serving on the council, she was deputy director of the North Carolina Administrative Office of the Courts, where she worked alongside Chief Justice Burley Mitchell and lobbyied for the court system. In this capacity, she promoted increased funding for the judiciary to increase personnel and improve their technological resources. Bonds was part of a multi-agency team that worked to obtain $30 million for North Carolina's Criminal Justice Information Network.

In 1995, she was elected as the town's Mayor Pro Tempore, and was re-elected in 1999. In 2002, she was appointed as the mayor of Knightdale, becoming the town's first woman mayor.

Milliken Bonds was awarded the Henry Toll Fellowship in 1997 by the Council of State Governments.

=== Academia and other work ===
Bonds is a professor of practice, impact investment, and sustainable finance at UNC Chapel Hill.

Bonds serves as the Chair of the South Carolina Capital Alliance's board of directors. She also served as the Leader of Community Development for the Federal Reserve Bank of Richmond.

== Personal life ==
She is a member of the Junior League and, as of 2023, serves as the Advisory Board Chair for the Beta Rho chapter of Kappa Alpha Theta at Duke University.
