= Rachelle Friedman =

American blogger (born 1985)

Rachelle Friedman Chapman
- Born: Rachelle Friedman; October 2, 1985 (age 41); Norfolk, Virginia, U.S.
- Education: Cape Henry Collegiate School; East Carolina University
- Occupations: Blogger, author
- Spouse: Chris Chapman
- Children: 1

Rachelle Friedman Chapman (born 1985) is an American blogger best known for becoming paralyzed after a 2010 accident where her best friend playfully pushed her into a pool during her bachelorette party.

== Early life and education ==
Friedman is from a Jewish family. Her parents are Carol and Larry Friedman. She attended Cape Henry Collegiate School, a private school in Virginia Beach, Virginia and in 2008, she graduated from East Carolina University in Greenville, North Carolina with a degree in recreation management.

== Accident ==
In May 2010, Friedman and her best friends returned home from her bachelorette party and decided to go swimming. One of her friends playfully pushed her into the pool, ultimately causing Friedman to shatter her vertebrae and become quadriplegic. Friedman has done many interviews, on shows including Katie and The Today Show since her accident, and wrote a book, The Promise, so called for the promise she and her friends made amongst each other to never name the friend who pushed her, chronicling her life leading up to the accident as well as the aftermath. The book was published by Skirt!, an imprint of Globe Pequot Press, in 2014.

== Personal life ==
Friedman met her husband, Chris Chapman, while attending East Carolina University. Their wedding was postponed after her accident, but the two were married on July 22, 2011. Their daughter, Kaylee Rae Chapman, was born on April 26, 2015, in Asheville, North Carolina to a surrogate. As of 2014, she lives in Knightdale, North Carolina where her husband is a teacher at Heritage Middle School in Wake County, North Carolina.
