= Godfrey Cheshire =

American film critic

- Born: June 3, 1951 (age 74); Raleigh, North Carolina, U.S.
- Occupations: Film critic, film writer, director

Godfrey Cheshire III (born June 3, 1951) is an American film critic, film writer and director.

He was instrumental in the founding of Raleigh's Spectator Magazine in 1978. He served as chairman of the New York Film Critics Circle.

In 2001 and in 2005, he received three awards for best arts criticism from the Association of Alternative Newsweeklies.

== Personal life ==
Cheshire was born and grew up in Raleigh, North Carolina. His parents are Sis and Buddy Cheshire. He has one brother, Sprague, and a sister, Sugar. He has two nieces, Sarah and Davi, and one nephew, Joe. He lives in New York.

== Filmmaker ==
In 2005, he began shooting a documentary named Moving Midway, which shows the effect on his family of the moving of the family's plantation house from a site near a busy road back into the woods and a proper, tranquil setting, and at the same time, the effect on his family of meeting descendants of slaves his family had owned, including those descended from a slave and his great-grandfather.

== Film critic ==
He was instrumental in the founding of Raleigh's Spectator Magazine in 1978. At that time he began writing film criticism professionally. He moved to New York in 1991, and has written for numerous national and international publications, including The New York Times, Variety, The Village Voice, The New York Press, Interview, Film Comment, Oxford American, the Independent Weekly and RogerEbert.com.

Of special interest to him are cinematic representations of the Southern United States, Iranian film, and the transition from analog to digital technology.

Cheshire participated in the 2012 Sight & Sound critics' poll, where he listed his ten favorite films as follows: 2001: A Space Odyssey, Ali: Fear Eats the Soul, Battleship Potemkin, Close-Up, The Godfather: Part II, Intolerance, A Man Escaped, The Man Who Shot Liberty Valance, The Passion of Joan of Arc, and Rear Window.
