= Congregation Oheb Sholom (Goldsboro, North Carolina) =

Reform synagogue in North Carolina, US

- Location of the former synagogue in North Carolina

Religion
- Affiliation: Reform Judaism (former)
- Ecclesiastical or organizational status: Synagogue (former)
- Status: Inactive; leased to an Episcopal church for use as a food pantry

Location
- Location: Goldsboro, North Carolina
- Country: United States
- Interactive map of Congregation Oheb Sholom
- Coordinates: 35°23′10″N 77°59′51″W

Architecture
- Architect: Milton Harding
- Type: Synagogue
- Style: Romanesque Revival
- Established: 1833 (as a congregation)
- Completed: 1886
- Materials: Red brick

Congregation Oheb Sholom (transliterated from Hebrew as "Lovers of Peace") is a former Reform Jewish congregation and synagogue that was located in Goldsboro, North Carolina, in the United States. The former synagogue building is one of fewer than a hundred nineteenth-century synagogues still standing in the United States, and the second oldest synagogue building in the state.

The congregation is inactive and the former synagogue building is leased to an Episcopal church for use as a food pantry.

== History ==
The congregation was founded in February 1883 by 33 Jewish men who met "for the purpose of building a synagogue" in Goldsboro. The Goldsboro Jewish community already had a Torah and met for prayers, probably in private homes, in addition to having already formed a Cemetery Association and a Ladies' Hebrew Assistance Society. Since several families had moved to Goldsboro from Baltimore, Maryland, the congregation was patterned on the moderate Reform style of Baltimore's Temple Oheb Sholom.

Among the leading families were the Weils. Herman Weil had arrived in the United States in 1858, and was soon joined by his brothers, Henry and Solomon. They had become successful businessmen in Goldsboro by the 1870s. Solomon and Henry Weil donated the land for Herman Park, named for Herman Weil, to the City of Goldsboro on July 21, 1890. Lionel Weil, son of Solomon and Sarah Weil, donated 219 acres (89 ha) in 1945 to the State of North Carolina for a nature park, now known as Cliffs of the Neuse State Park. Gertrude Weil, daughter of Henry and Mina Weil, was a leader of the women's suffrage movement and active in a variety of progressive causes. She founded the North Carolina League of Women Voters.

The two-story, red brick synagogue was designed by Milton Harding in 1886, and is an example of Romanesque Revival architecture. It was the second Jewish house of worship in North Carolina.

== Notable members ==
- Heilig-Meyers founders, William Heilig and Max Meyers, furniture retailers
- Gertrude Weil, social activist and suffragette
