= Cape Henry Collegiate School =

Prep school in Virginia Beach, Virginia, US

Coordinates: 36°52′37″N 76°1′45.8″W

Cape Henry Collegiate
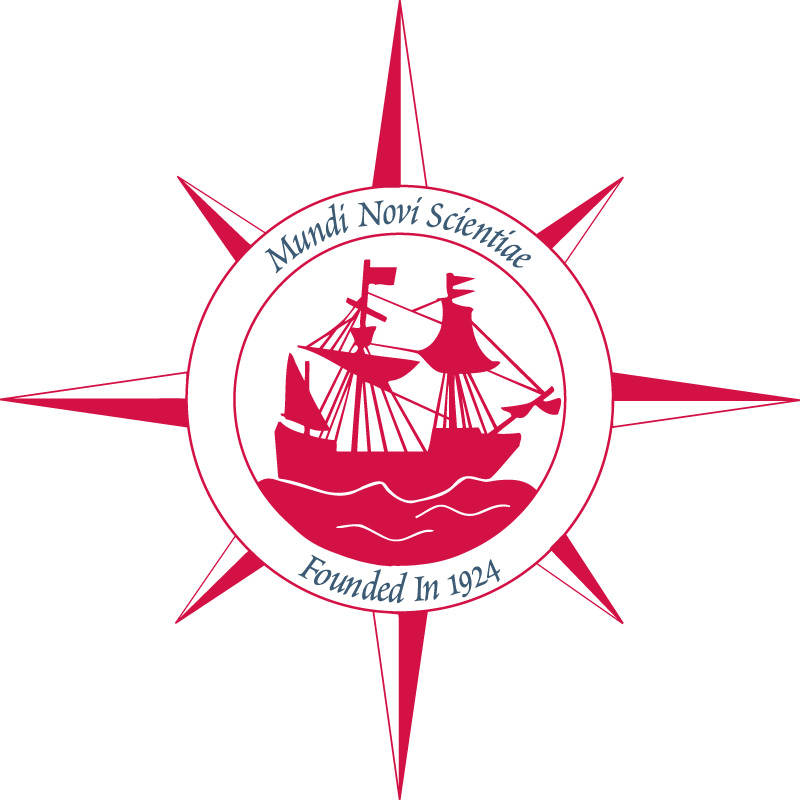

Location
- 1320 Mill Dam Road; Virginia Beach, Virginia; United States

Information
- Type: Private, College-prep, Day
- Motto: Mundi Novi Scientiae (New world of knowledge)
- Established: 1924
- CEEB code: 472286
- Head of school: Christopher S. Garran, Ph.D.
- Grades: PK–12
- Gender: Co-ed
- Enrollment: 900
- Student to teacher ratio: 10:1
- Campus size: 30 acres (12 ha)
- Campus type: Suburban
- Colors: Red and Gray
- Athletics conference: TCIS
- Mascot: Dolphin
- Endowment: $23 million
- Website: Cape Henry Collegiate

Cape Henry Collegiate (formerly Cape Henry Collegiate School, also known as Cape Henry or CHC) is a private, college-preparatory, coeducational, day school located in Virginia Beach, Virginia.

== History ==
Cape Henry Collegiate is the oldest accredited private, college-preparatory, co-educational, independent day school in Virginia Beach, Virginia. Cape Henry sits on a 30-acre campus in a residential area within five miles of the Atlantic Ocean. Established in 1924 as the Everett School, the school enrolls 1050 students from Pre-K3 through 12th grade.

It is accredited by the Virginia Association of Independent Schools (VAIS), Southern Association of Independent Schools (SAIS), and Southern Association of Colleges and Schools (SACS) and is recognized as an accredited school by the Virginia Board of Education.

Tuition (2021-2022 school year) ranges from $12,850 in Pre-Kindergarten to $21,440 in grades 9–12.

== Athletics ==
Cape Henry offers 22 Varsity sports.

The boys soccer team and girls field hockey teams have won back-to-back state championships.

Since 2004, State Championships have been earned in Baseball (2010,2012), Boys Basketball (2012, 2015), Boys Lacrosse (2004), Boys Soccer (2017, 2018,2019), Boys Tennis (2012, 2013), Girls Basketball (2011, 2012), Field Hockey (2005, 2010, 2011, 2017, 2018,2019) Girls Lacrosse (2007, 2012), Girls Tennis (2008, 2011, 2013, 2014) and Girls Volleyball (2008, 2009, 2010, 2011).

Recent Championships (2018-2019):

- 2019 TCIS Regular Season, Tournament Champion, and Division I Boys State Soccer Champions
- 2019 TCIS Tournament Champions and Division II Girls State Field Hockey Champions
- 2019 TCIS Regular Season & Tournament Championship Golf Team
- 2019 TCIS Regular Season & Tournament Championship Wrestling Team
- 2019 Regular Season Boys Basketball Championship Team
- 2018 TCIS Regular Season & TCIS Tournament Championship Wrestling Team
- 2018 TCIS Tournament Championship Girls T&F Team
- 2018 TCIS Tournament Championship Coed Golf Team
- 2018 TCIS Tournament Champion & State Championship Field Hockey Team
- 2018 TCIS Regular Season, TCIS Tournament, & State Championship Boys Soccer Team
- 2017 State Championship Field Hockey Team
- 2017 TCIS Regular Season, TCIS Tournament, & State Championship Boys Soccer Team
- 2017 TCIS Regular Season & Tournament Championship Wrestling Team
- 2017 TCIS Regular Season Championship Boys Tennis Team
- 2017 TCIS Invitational Championship Boys Volleyball Team

=== Sports ===
The following sports are offered to boys at Cape Henry Collegiate:

Fall	Winter	Spring
Cross country (V)	Basketball (6, 7, 8, JV, V)	Baseball (6/7/8, JV, V)
Soccer (6/7/8, JV, V)	Cheerleading (V)	Crew (V)
Volleyball (V)	Swimming (V)	Golf (JV, V)
	Wrestling (6/7/8/JV, V)	Lacrosse (6/7/8, JV, V)
	Indoor track (JV/V)	Tennis (6/7/8, JV, V)
		Track (JV/V)

The following sports are offered to girls at Cape Henry Collegiate School:

Fall	Winter	Spring
Cross country (V)	Basketball (6/7/8, JV, V)	Crew (V)
Field hockey (6/7/8, JV, V)	Cheerleading (V)	Golf (JV, V)
Tennis (6/7/8, JV, V)	Swimming (V)	Lacrosse (6/7/8, JV, V)
Volleyball (6/7/8, JV, V)	Indoor track (JV/V)	Soccer (6/7/8, JV, V)
		Softball (6/7/8, V)
		Track (V)

== Accreditation, affiliations, and associations ==
Cape Henry Collegiate School is accredited, affiliated, or associated with the following organizations:

- National Association of Independent Schools (NAIS)
- Southern Association of Independent Schools (SAIS)
- Virginia Council for Private Education (VCPE)
- Association of College Counselors in Independent Schools (ACCIS)
- AdvancED
- Association of Independent School Admissions Professionals (AISAP)
- Council for Advancement and Support of Education (CASE)
- The Cum Laude Society
- Educational Records Bureau (ERB)
- Global Education Benchmarking Group (GEBG)
- Independent School Data Exchange (INDEX)
- Southern Association of Colleges and Schools (SACS)
- National Association for College Admission Counseling (NACAC)
- National Business Officers (NBOA)
- National Honor Society (NHS)
- Potomac and Chesapeake Association for College Admission Counseling (PCACAC)

== Notable faculty and alumni ==
- Tim Hummel – former Major League Baseball player and current coach at CHC.
- Rachelle Friedman – blogger
- Devon Hall, NBA player for the Oklahoma City Thunder
- Sean Poppen, MLB player for the San Diego Padres
