= Midway Plantation House and Outbuildings =

Historic house in North Carolina, United States

- U.S. National Register of Historic Places
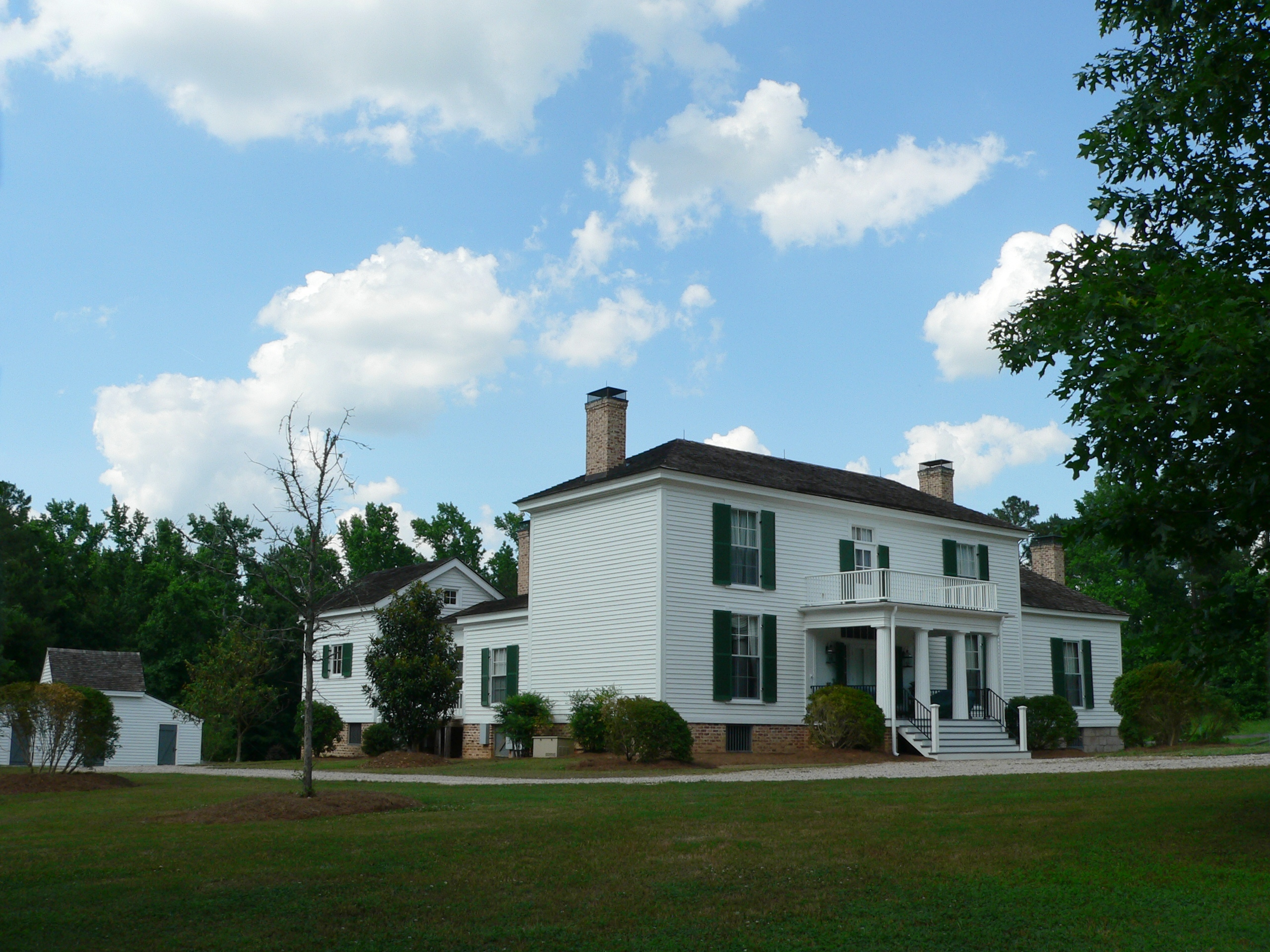
- Midway Plantation House viewed from the southwest

- Location within North Carolina Location within the United States
- Location: 1625 Old Crews Road, Knightdale, North Carolina
- Coordinates: 35°49′24.60″N 78°29′39.25″W
- Built: 1848
- Architectural style: Greek Revival
- MPS: Wake County MPS
- NRHP reference No.: 07000543
- Added to NRHP: January 6, 1987

The Midway Plantation House and Outbuildings are a set of historic buildings constructed in the mid-19th century in present-day Knightdale, North Carolina, as part of a forced-labor farm.

The two-story plantation house was built in 1848 about 0.75 miles (1.21 km) west of present-day Knightdale, along the wagon trail that would eventually become U.S. Route 64. It was built by Charles Lewis Hinton, a farmer, slaver owner, and state treasurer, as a wedding gift for his son, David, and daughter-in-law, Mary Boddie Carr (sister of Governor Elias Carr). David and Mary's daughter, the anti-suffragist Mary Hilliard Hinton, was born here. It was named for its position halfway between two other Hinton family properties: Beaver Dam and The Oaks.

Other structures on the site included a carriage house, kitchen, smokehouse, potato house, well house, ice house, cotton gin, loom house, doll house, office, school, two stables, and several slave quarters. Of these, only the kitchen, school, office, and carriage and doll houses remain.

In June 2005, the house and surviving outbuildings were moved about 2 miles (3.2 km) north to make way for a large shopping center. The move and Hinton family history are documented by Hinton descendant and film critic Godfrey Cheshire in Moving Midway (2007).

It was listed on the National Register of Historic Places in 2007.

== See also ==
- List of Registered Historical Places in North Carolina
- National Register of Historic Places listings in Wake County, North Carolina
