= Cliffs of the Neuse State Park =

State park in North Carolina, U.S.

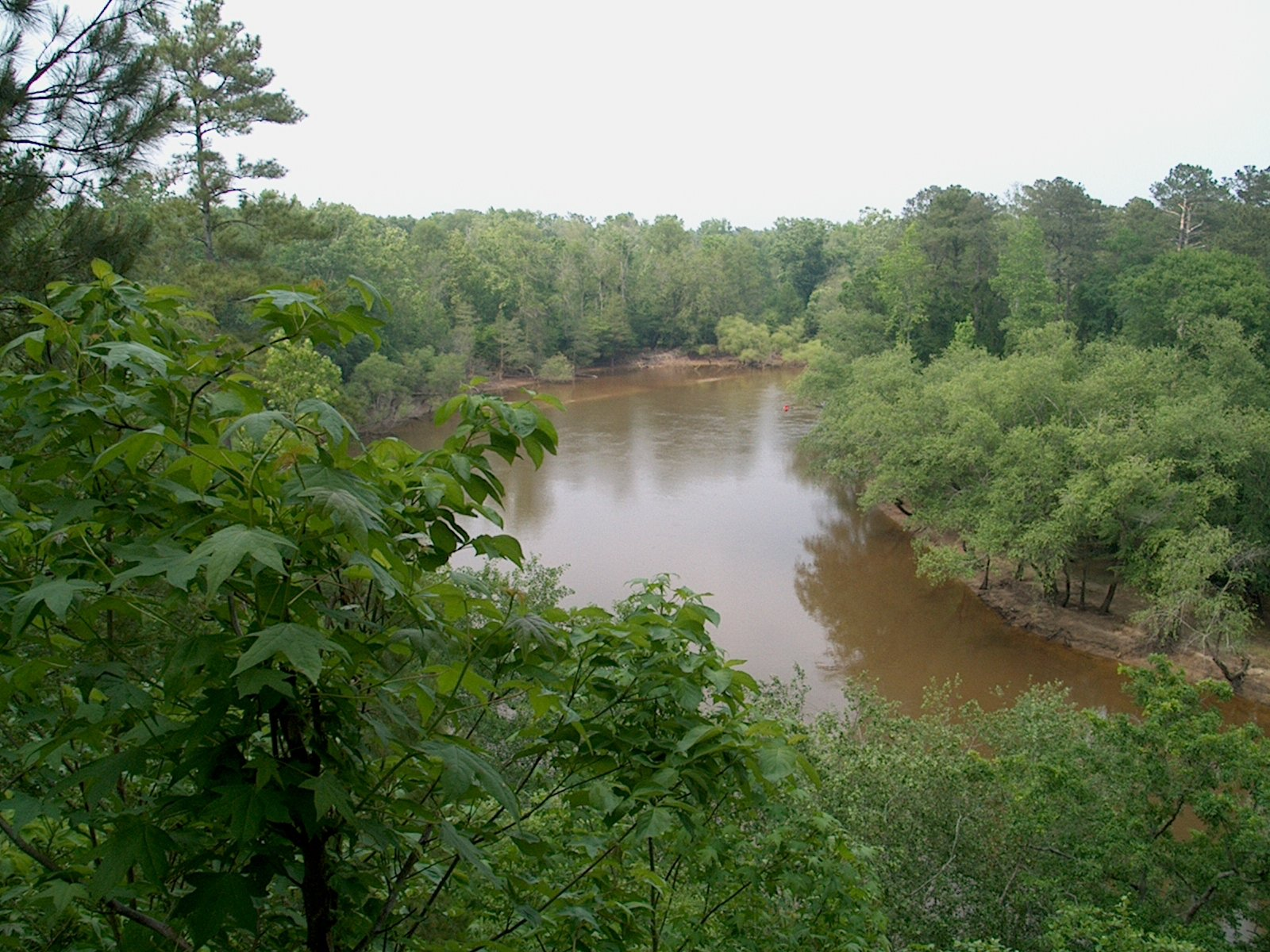
- The Neuse River seen from the cliffs above

- Location within North Carolina Location within the United States
- Interactive map of Cliffs of the Neuse State Park
- Location: Wayne County, North Carolina, United States
- Coordinates: 35°14′07″N 77°53′36″W
- Area: 1,097 acres (444 ha)
- Established: 1945
- Administrator: North Carolina Division of Parks and Recreation
- Website: Official website

Cliffs of the Neuse State Park is a North Carolina state park near Seven Springs, North Carolina, in Wayne County covering 1,097 acres (4.4 km^{2}) along the southern banks of the Neuse River. It has a swimming area, camp sites, hiking trails, fishing areas, and picnic areas. The park's museum features exhibits about the geology and natural history of the cliffs and the park. Extending for 600 yards (550 m), the series of cliffs rise 90 feet (27 m) above the water. Layers of sand, clay, seashells, shale and gravel form the multicolored cliff face, a rainbow of white, tan, yellow and brown.

== History ==
The cliffs were formed when a fault in the Earth's crust shifted millions of years ago. The Neuse River followed this fault line and, over time, cut its course through layers of sediment deposited by shallow seas that had earlier covered the coastal plain. A portion of the river took a bend against its bank and the water's erosive action slowly carved Cliffs of the Neuse.

Much of the human history of the area centers around the river. The Tuscarora and Saponi Indian tribes once occupied much of the land between the Neuse and Pamlico rivers. What is now the park used to be a ceremonial ground and a gathering place for hunting expeditions. The river was also used for travel into the surrounding wilderness.

In 1944, local landowner Lionel Weil, a founder of Goldsboro's historic Oheb Shalom synagogue and uncle of Gertrude Weil, proposed that the cliffs area along the Neuse River be preserved as a state park. The park was established in 1945 when land on the south side of the river was donated by Lionel Weil and other individuals through the Wayne Foundation. An additional contribution of approximately 200 acres (0.8 km^{2}) extended the boundary east of the river. Additional purchases and donations increased the park to 892 acres (3.6 km^{2}).

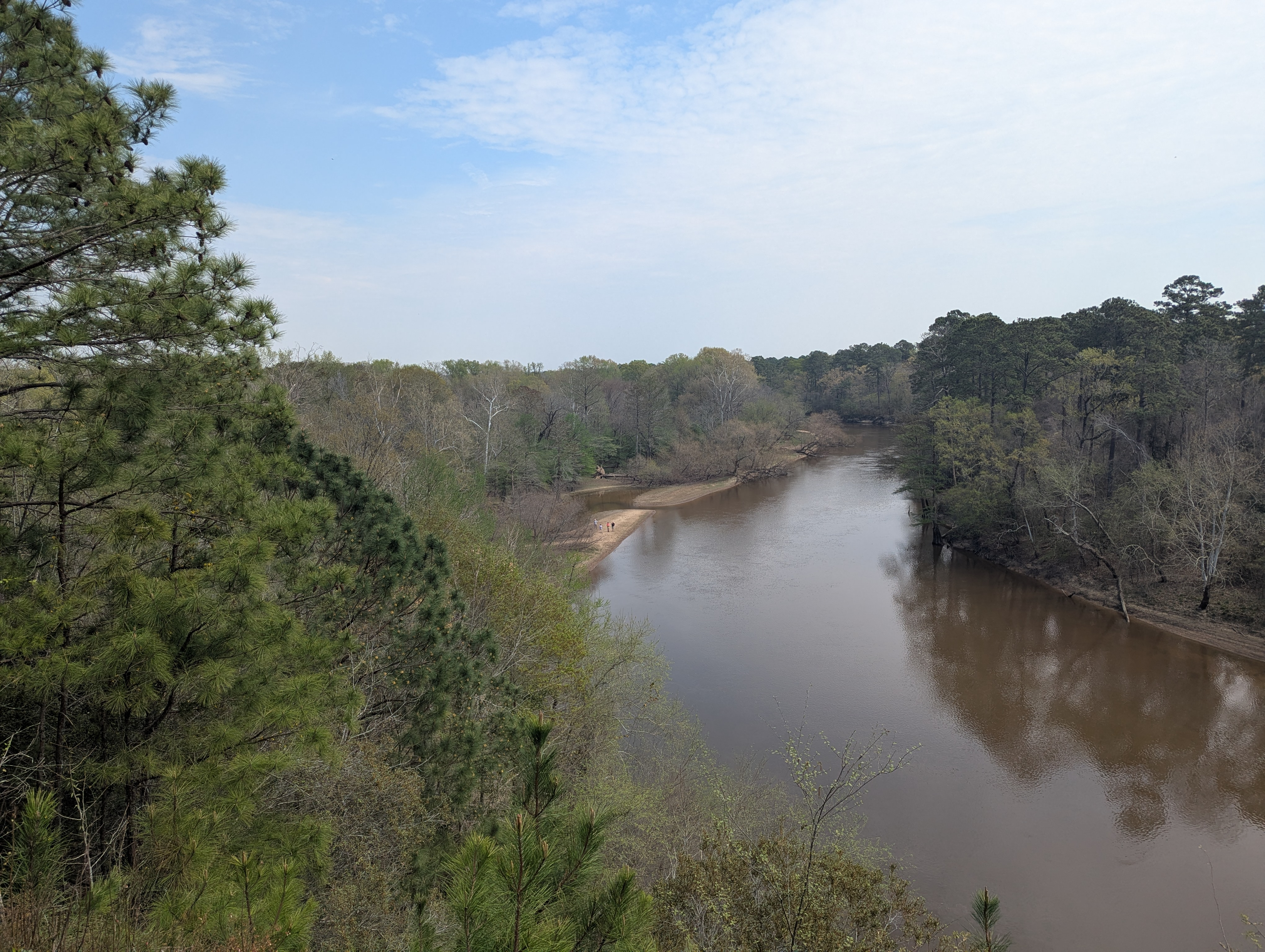
Look down at the Neuse River from the Cliffs overlook, Cliffs of the Neuse State Park, March 2026.

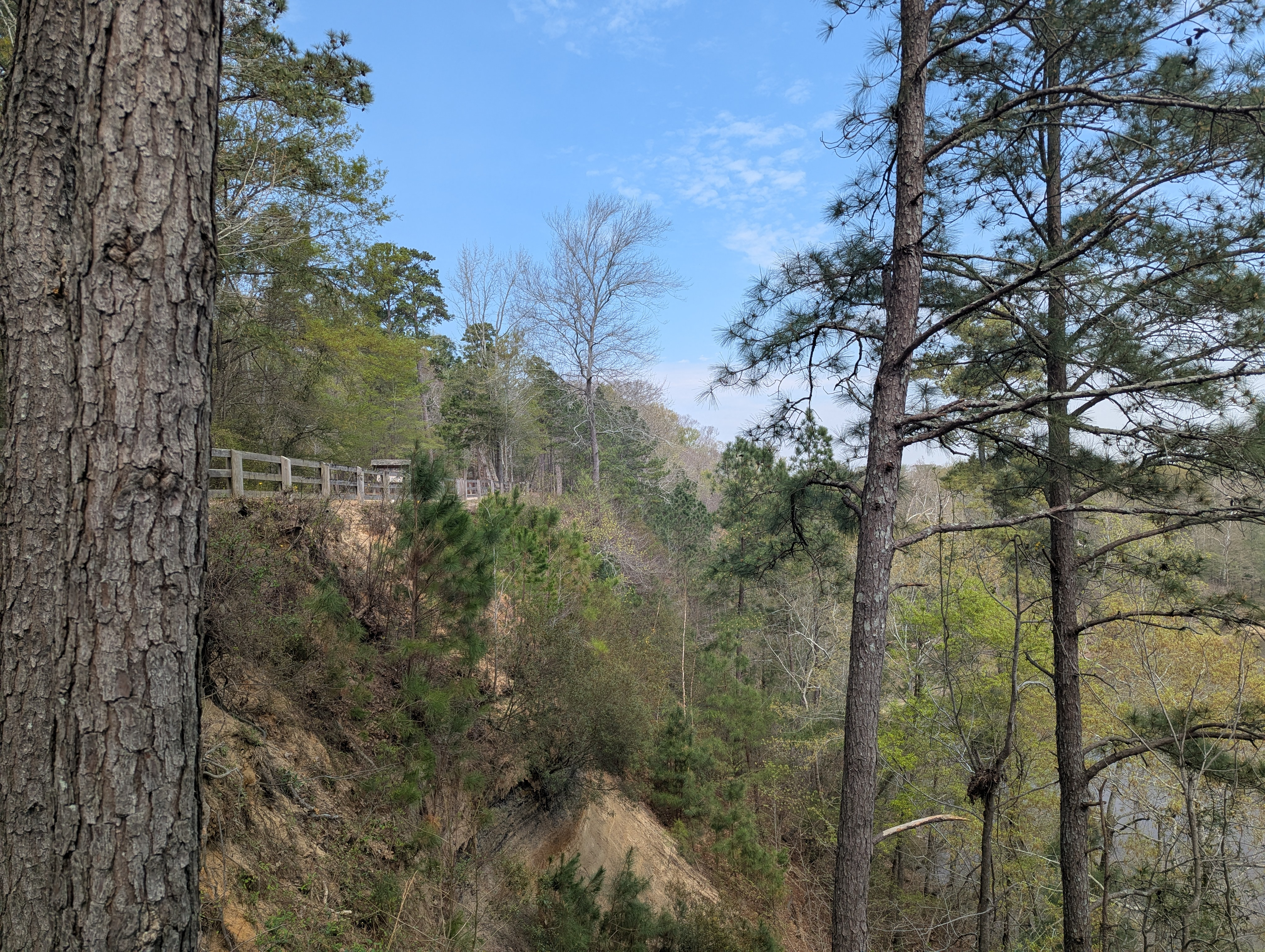
Visualization of the sides of the cliffs next to the Neuse River (lower right), Cliffs of the Neuse State Park, March 2026.

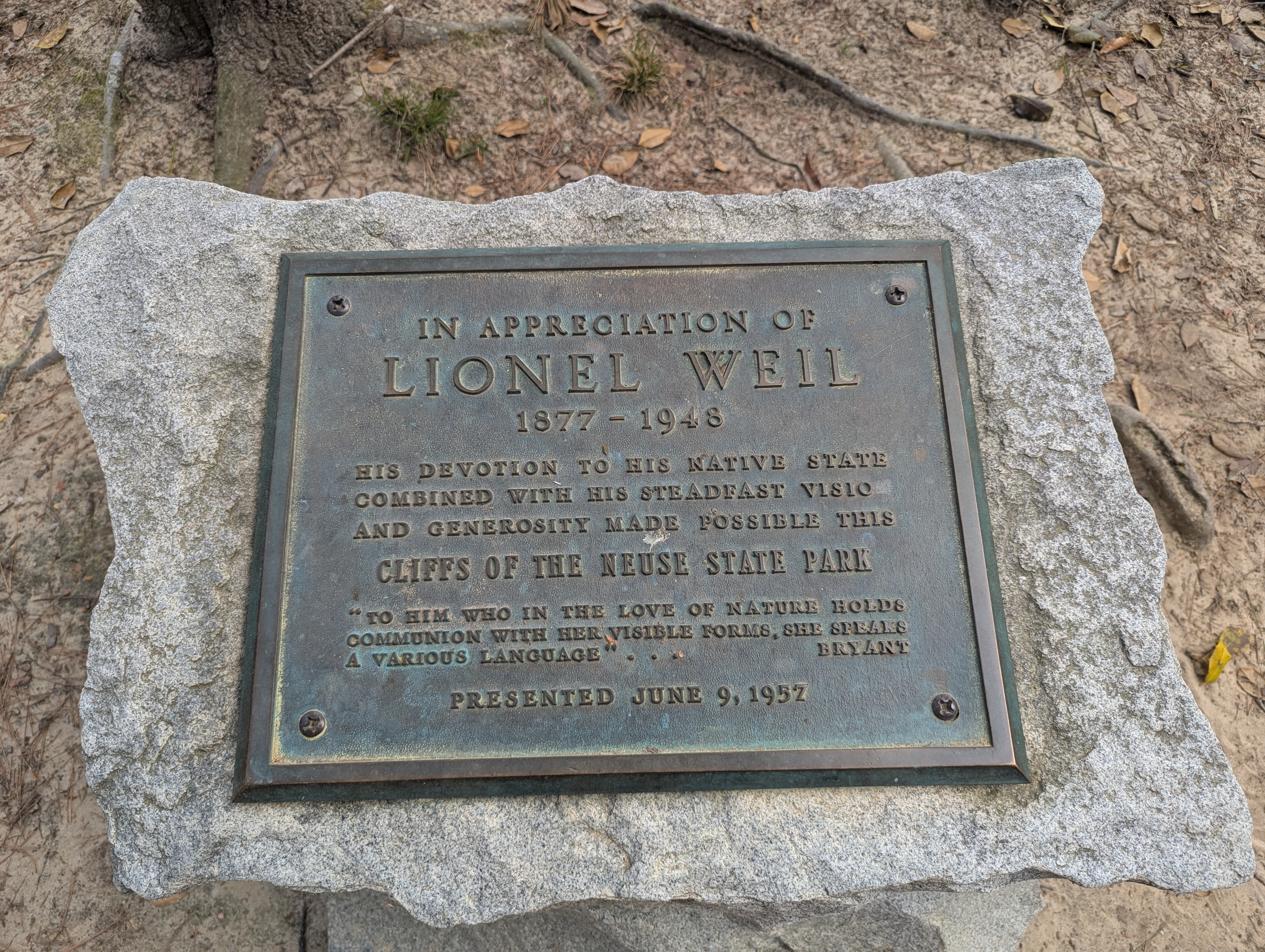
Plaque acknowledging Lionel Weil's contribution to creating Cliffs of The Neuse State Park.

== Wildlife ==
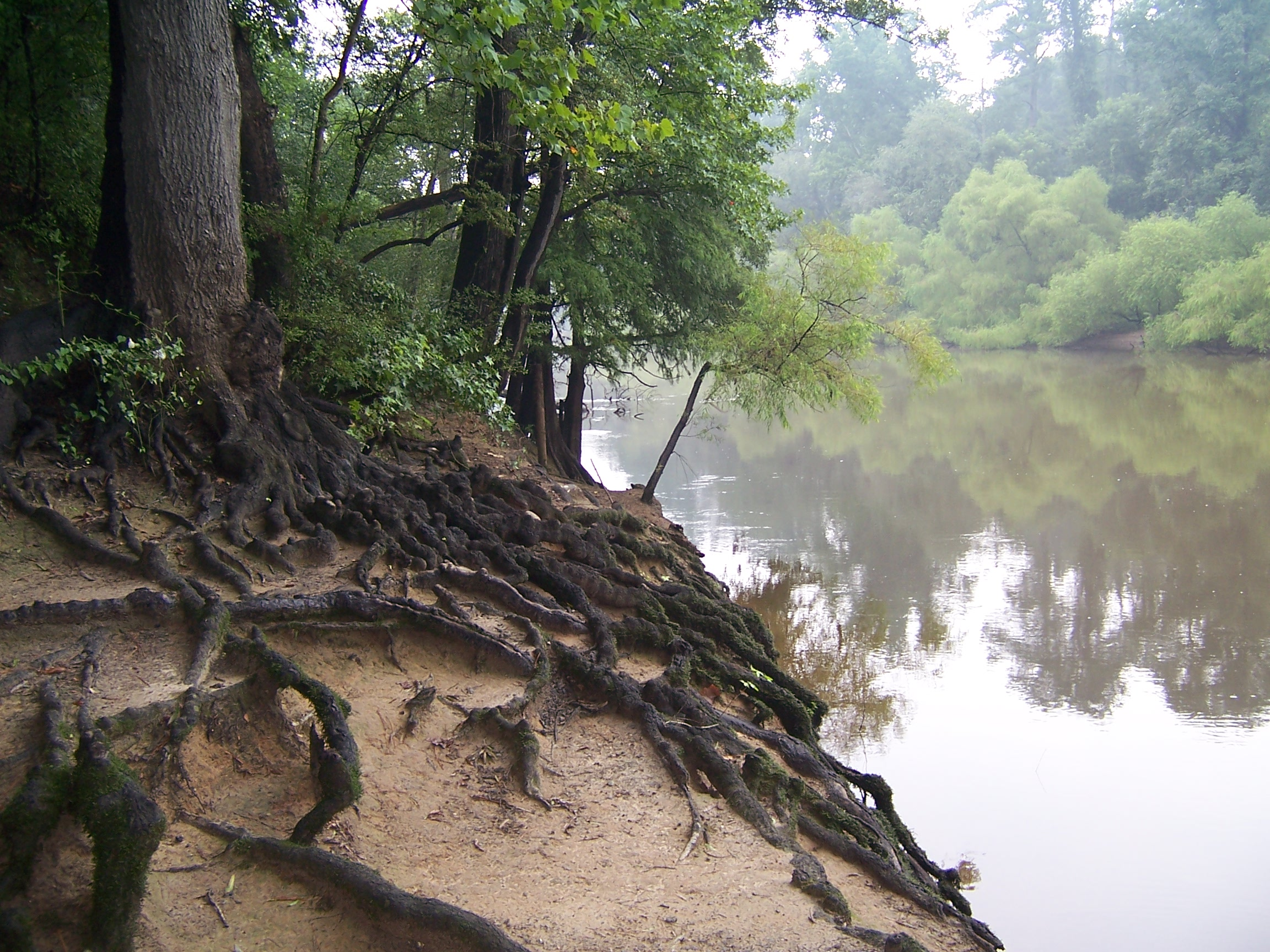
Tree roots at riverside in park.

A range of habitats contributes to the variety of plants in the park. River margins, flood plains, rolling uplands and ravines are home to a large mixture of trees, shrubs and herbaceous plants. More than 420 species of plants have been recorded in the park.

Opossums, raccoons, foxes, and squirrels are common in the campground and along hiking trails, while river otter and muskrat can be seen swimming along the waterways. Reptiles and amphibians are equally at home in the wetland and aquatic habitats. Most of the snakes are nonvenomous, although copperheads are present. Small nocturnal rodents and white-tailed deer live in the area but are discreet and seldom seen. Sightings of black bears and a coyote have taken place at the park.

Birds are abundant in the park during any season. The northern parula nests in clumps of Spanish moss while the prothonotary warbler lives along the river. Fall and winter bring a host of migratory waterfowl to the area to join the native wood duck.
