= Moving Midway =

- Directed by: Godfrey Cheshire
- Written by: Godfrey Cheshire
- Produced by: Godfrey Cheshire; Vincent Farrell; Jay Spain
- Narrated by: Godfrey Cheshire
- Cinematography: Jay Spain
- Edited by: Ramsey Fendall; Greg Loser
- Music by: Ahrin Mishan
- Distributed by: First Run Features (North America); HanWay Films (International)
- Release dates: April 14, 2007 (Full Frame Documentary Film Festival); September 12, 2008 (United States)
- Running time: 95 minutes
- Country: United States
- Language: English
- Box office: $40,864 (domestic)

Moving Midway is a 2007 American documentary film directed by film critic Godfrey Cheshire. The film follows Cheshire's cousin Charlie moving the Midway Plantation House and Outbuildings to a new location, and what the Midway means to his family and other groups. The film was shot around 2005 and premiered at the Full Frame Documentary Film Festival on April 14, 2007, followed by a limited release on September 12, 2008.

== Plot summary ==
Godfrey Cheshire is an American film critic who had helped found Raleigh's Spectator Magazine and written for various publications such as The New York Times and more. In early 2004, he learns that his cousin Charlie wants to move the buildings of Midway Plantation. The documentary features interviews with many of the family members, who worry that moving the buildings would destroy Midway. Cheshire learns about the African-American branch of Midway, and reaches out to a NYU professor, Dr. Robert Hinton, who shows him a new perspective on the Midway.

The film features excerpts from Gone with the Wind, The Birth of a Nation, The Littlest Rebel, Jezebel, Song of the South, Uncle Tom's Cabin, and Roots, among others. Blues songs were performed by Algia Mae Hinton.

== Reception ==
The film received very positive reviews. On the review aggregator website Rotten Tomatoes, it has a 100% approval rating, based on 25 reviews. The critics consensus reads, "This strange, heartfelt documentary from film critic Godfrey Cheshire is a fascinating examination of his family roots, as well as an evocative meditation on the complexities of the South."

Roger Ebert of the Chicago Sun-Times gave the film 3 out of 4 stars, claiming that "it starts in one direction and discovers a better one. Cheshire is a dry, almost dispassionate narrator, and that is good; preaching about his discoveries would sound wrong." LA Weekly named it the 9th best film of 2008 along with The Order of Myths. Andrew Sarris of New York Observer named it the 2nd best non-fiction film of the year.
