= St. Matthew's Township, Wake County, North Carolina =

Township in Wake County, North Carolina, U.S.

Coordinates: 35.8181622°N 78.4979248°W

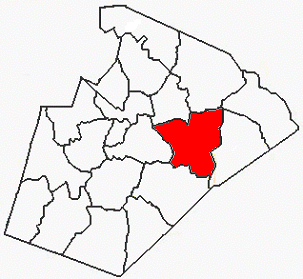

Saint Matthew's Township (also designated Township 17) is one of twenty townships within Wake County, North Carolina, United States. As of the 2010 United States census, Saint Matthew's Township had a population of 65,731, a 47.3% increase over 2000.

Saint Matthew's Township, occupying 57.5 square miles (148.9 km^{2}) in east-central Wake County, includes portions of the city of Raleigh and the entirety of the town of Knightdale.
