= Capital Area Greenway =

Greenway trail system in Raleigh, North Carolina, US

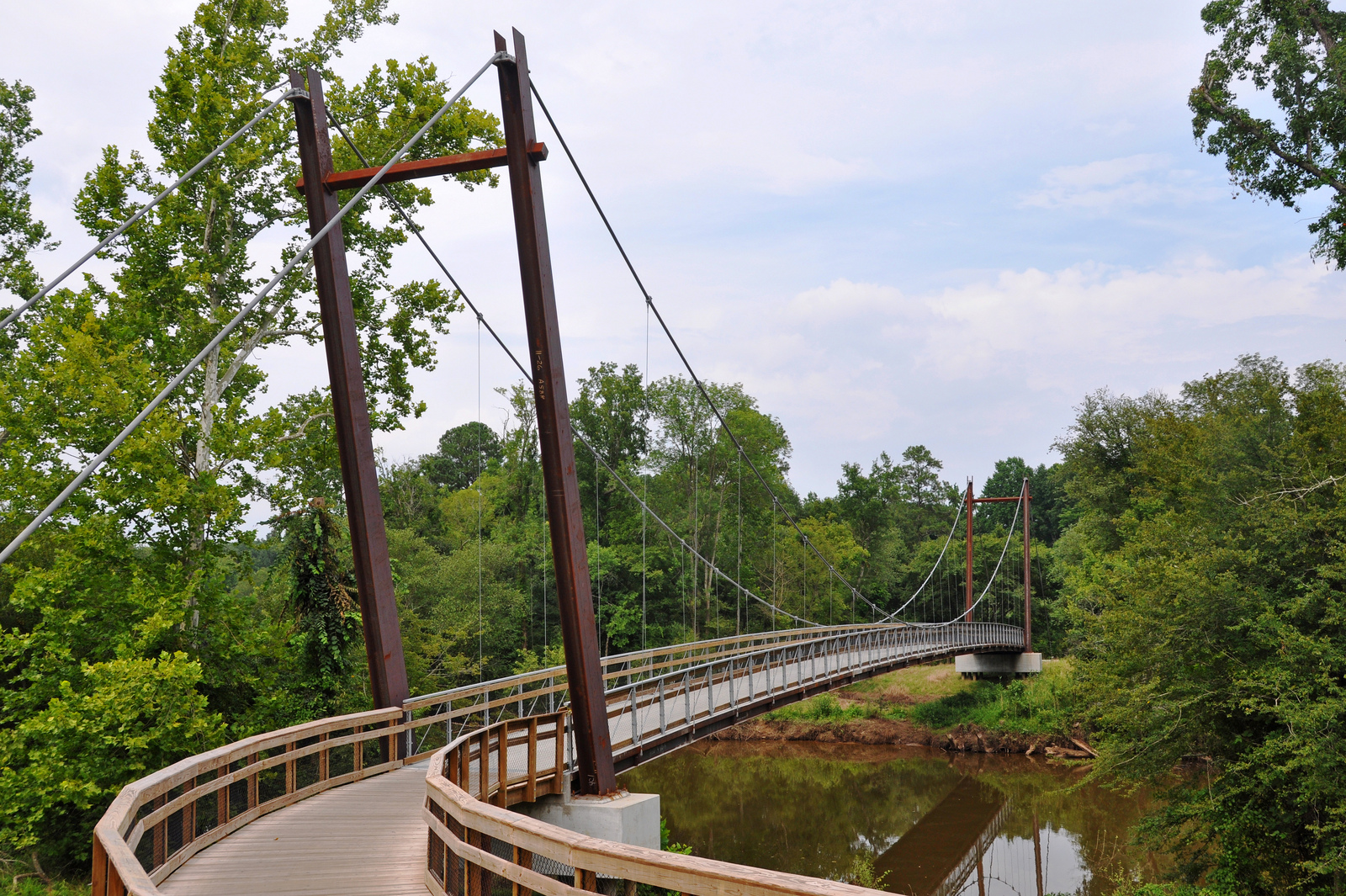
Skycrest suspension bridge, Neuse River Trail

The Capital Area Greenway is a greenway trail system through the city of Raleigh, North Carolina. Started in 1974, it currently spans over 112 miles (161 km) and 3800 acres (12 km²) throughout much Wake County. The Greenway system also connects to similar systems in neighboring counties and trails built by individual towns within Wake County which are not formally integrated into the Greenway system. Portions of the system are also part of larger national and regional trail system such as the East Coast Greenway and the Mountains-to-Sea Trail.

== History ==
In the early 1970s, some citizens of the City of Raleigh became increasingly concerned about growth in and around the city. At the time some thought that the increasing urbanization would destroy the city's natural environment and characteristics. In 1970 Raleigh had a population of around 118,000. By 2015, just forty-five years later, it had just under half a million. City officials responded to the concerns with 'The Greenway Master Plan'. The idea started when the Raleigh City Council and The Parks and Recreation Advisory Commission commissioned a document that would be presented to the council. It was called "Raleigh: The Park with a City in It".

The study has found that the natural features of Raleigh make it economically sound and financially realistic...to create a network of parks (and) green open space...(that) can enhance Raleigh's already distinctive environment and insure...adequate recreation facilities for the future.

The following year The Raleigh City Council commissioned a second report. This report would be named 'Capital City Greenway', and the report covered how to manage water from the city's two major creeks Crabtree and Walnut, other flood prevention, wildlife conservation, and the introduction of a trail system. The idea was that green and open space would provide a habitat for animals, and maintain a wetland to be used as a buffer between homes in the area's and creeks that often overflow. This included a trail near what was then the newly opened Crabtree Valley Mall - that regularly flooded during heavy rain. The City of Raleigh started purchasing land for what would become the nation's first citywide greenway system in 1974.

By the end of 1975, the city compiled a few isolated paths around the city. Over the next thirty years the city, along with the county (Wake County), continued investing in the project. This led to the current total of 114 miles of walking or running paths which are on over 3700 acres of preserved land around Wake County, of which Raleigh is the county seat.

Subsequently, the focus of the project shifted from building long and individual paths to connecting paths that have already been built. "The emphasis today is on tying up those loose ends," said Vic Lebsock the Senior Greenway Planner for Raleigh as of 2017.

== System Trails ==
| Name of Trail | Length (Mil.) |
|---|---|
| Abbotts Creek | 2.9 |
| Baileywick | 0.6 |
| Beaver Dam | 0.8 |
| Birch Ridge Connector | 0.3 |
| Centennial Bikeway Connector | 2.3 |
| Crabtree Creek | 14.6 |
| East Fork Mine Creek | 2.5 |
| Edwards Mill Connector | 1.3 |
| Garden Street | 0.7 |
| Hare Snipe Creek | 2.3 |
| Honeycutt | 3.8 |
| House Creek | 2.8 |
| Lake Johnson East Loop | 2.8 |
| Lake Johnson West Loop | 2.1 |
| Lake Lynn Loop | 1.9 |
| Little Rock | 1.6 |
| Marsh Creek | 0.3 |
| Martin Street Connector | 0.4 |
| Mine Creek | 4.1 |
| Neuse River | 27.5 |
| Reedy Creek | 5.0 |
| Richland Creek | 3.1 |
| Rocky Branch | 3.8 |
| Shelley Lake Loop | 2.1 |
| Simms Branch | 1.7 |
| Snelling Branch | 0.8 |
| Spring Forest | 0.4 |
| Wakefield | 1.4 |
| Walnut Creek | 15.6 |
