= Gertrude Weil =

American social activist

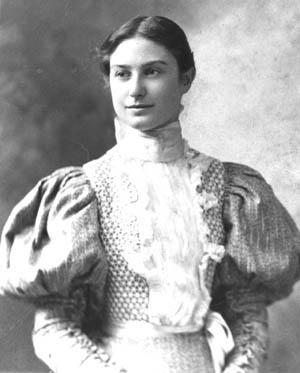
- Gertrude Weil circa 1896
- Born: December 11, 1879; Goldsboro, North Carolina, US
- Died: May 3, 1971 (aged 91); Goldsboro, North Carolina, US
- Resting place: Willow Dale Cemetery, Goldsboro, North Carolina
- Education: Smith College, 1901
- Occupation: Social Activist

Gertrude Weil (December 11, 1879 – May 3, 1971) was an American social activist involved in a wide range of progressive/leftist and often controversial causes, including women's suffrage, labor reform and civil rights.

== Biography ==
=== Early life ===
Weil was born on December 11, 1879, to Henry and Mina Weil (née Rosenthal), German Jews living in the rapidly developing town of Goldsboro, North Carolina. Weil's father, Henry, migrated from Hamburg, Germany in 1860, when he was fourteen years old, following his brother, Herman Weil, who would later fight in the Confederate Army during the American Civil War. Weil was raised in Goldsboro, North Carolina, in a home located at 200 Chestnut Street, which is now on the National Register of Historic Places. Being a wealthy household, the Weil family employed domestic staff, including both white and black employees. In 1883, only 17 years after the formation of North Carolina's first Jewish congregation, Gertrude's parents, grandparents, aunts and uncles helped to form Goldsboro's Congregation Oheb Sholom.

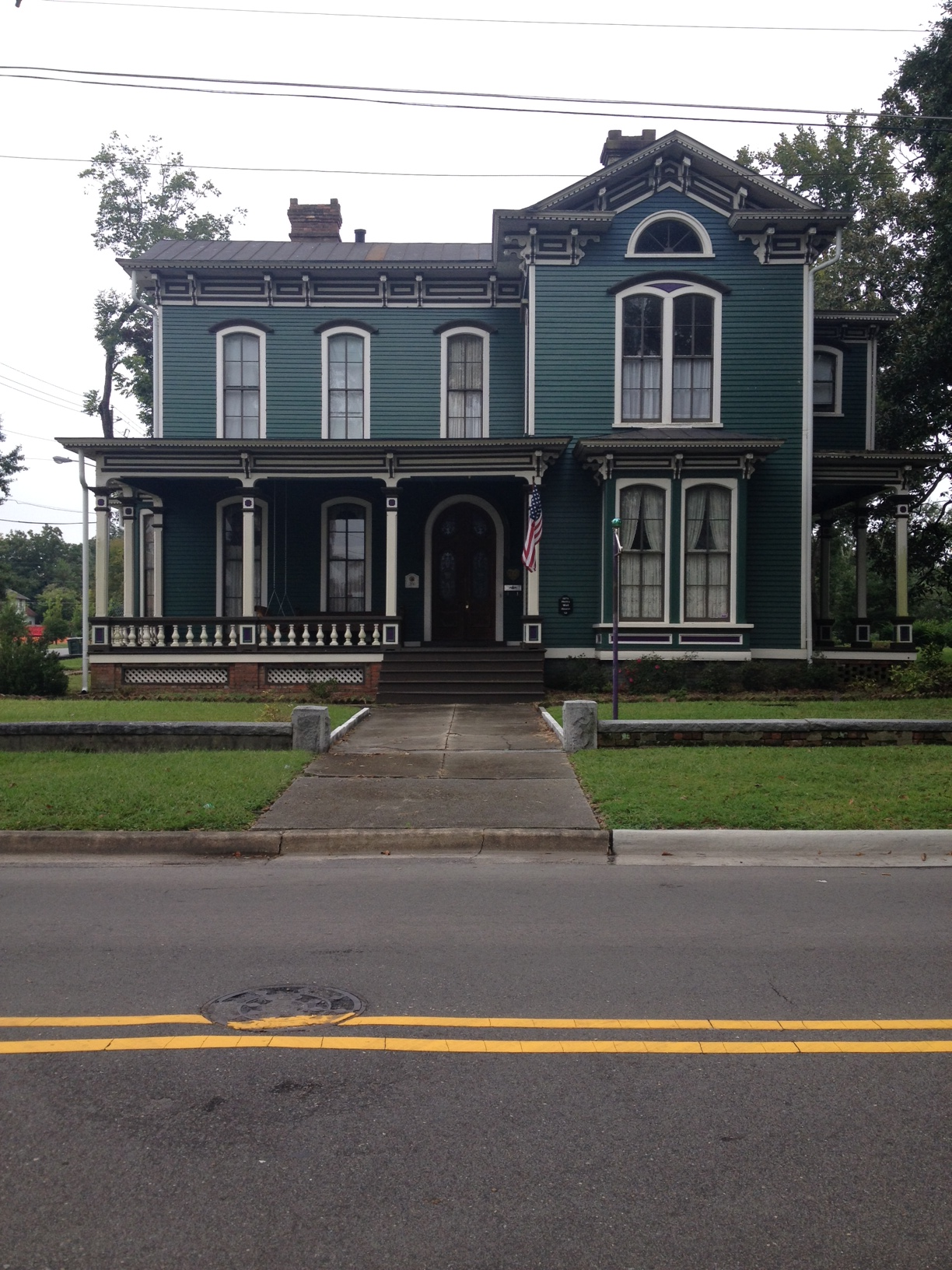
200 Chestnut Street, Weil's childhood home

=== Education ===
==== Early education ====
Weil grew up attending public schools within her community of Goldsboro. Weil's parents supplemented her education by having her attend Sabbath School, German School, and Hebrew School.

==== Horace Mann School (1895–1897) ====
When Weil was 16, during 1895, she was sent to New York City to attend the Horace Mann School. During this time at the Horace Mann School Weil began writing letters home to her family, or as she titled them, her "dear ones" relaying her experiences in New York. During her time at Horace Mann School, Weil was introduced to Margaret Stanton Lawrence, daughter of Elizabeth Cady Stanton. Margaret Stanton Lawrence was Weil's physical education teacher. Lawrence was an early influence on Weil, with Weil commenting after hearing Lawrence speak "Oh! You'll see me come home a thorough reformer." Despite consistent physical activity throughout her life, Weil had the disability of a curvature of her spine, which was diagnosed during her time at the Horace Mann School.

==== Smith College (1897–1901) ====
After attending the Horace Mann School Weil continued her education attending Smith College, a women's university in Northampton Massachusetts. Weil was housed, during her first year at Smith College, in the home of Mary Louise Cable, sister to novelist George Washington Cable, who opposed slavery and racism in his writing. During her time at Smith College Weil was exposed to the work of progressive reformers such as Jane Addams, attended lectures on gender inequalities, and attended lectures on women's role in confronting social justice, these experiences generating the basis for Weil's future work.

In 1899, Weil's Mother, Mina, established the Goldsboro Women's Club and dedicated the club to the feminist novelist Charlotte Perkins Gilman, whom she had heard speak in 1898. Weil was aware of Gilman's influence on her mother, with Mina writing in a letter to her, describing Gilman's lecture on the "New Woman." The Goldsboro Women's Club focused on serving their community, as well as meeting to discuss women's roles in increasing their responsibilities in social work and reform. Mina's beliefs and involvements with women's clubs would have a lasting impact on Weil's later involvement.

During the election of 1900, women had not been given the right to vote in the United States, but some women at Smith College, including Weil, participated in a mock presidential election. The end results of the mock election were 761 for Mckinley and 73 for Bryan. Weil did not reveal which candidate she voted for, but this experience introduced Weil to the world of politics and would influence her later involvement with the women's suffrage movement.

In April 1901, Weil traveled to New York in order to visit the settlement houses. During the same trip, Weil also visited the Italian and Chinese immigrant quarters.

In 1901, Weil became North Carolina's first alumna of Smith College.

==== Post-graduation ====
After graduation from Smith College, Weil was faced with the decision of whether to find a job in teaching, as some of her classmates did, or to return home. Weil considered moving to New York to work in the slum schools she had visited in April 1901. Weil also voiced her desire to work as a kindergarten teacher. Weil was advised by her mother, Mina, to acquire a trade, such as book frontispiece design. Ultimately, having been away from home for six years and facing pressure from her mother and family to return home, Weil returned to Goldsboro.

== Social activism and "Federation Gertie" ==
=== Early work: 1901–1905 ===
Having returned to Goldsboro, Weil enjoyed her life of leisure, but also searched for opportunities to work in the increasingly urbanized town. Her time at home allowed Weil to gain experience in domestic tasks as she assisted her mother with household work. Weil also became increasingly involved in the club her mother had helped found in 1899, the Goldsboro Women's Club, teaching sewing classes for financially disadvantaged women. Using her local experience, Weil became involved in the North Carolina Federation of Women's Clubs which had been founded in 1902 by Sally Southall Cotten. Through her work with the North Carolina Federation of Women's Clubs, Weil gained experience in social activism, gaining the nickname "Federation Gertie."

Weil studied at the University of Cornell for multiple summers, becoming educated in topics such as history, government, Shakespeare, and politics.

Upon establishment, the women's clubs in North Carolina focused on problems within their community and were not explicitly political. These groups focused on legislation that would aid women and children, but did not realize the need to become increasingly involved in the government until later.

== Women's suffrage movement ==
In 1911 Weil joined the National American Woman Suffrage Association which sought a federal policy change allowing women the right to vote. Weil often communicated with the future president of the association, Carrie Chapman Catt, who kept Weil up to date on the work that the association was doing, and Weil kept a scrapbook of newspaper clippings that mentioned NAWSA.

During the early 20th-century women's suffrage was not a popular topic among many women. Neither Weil's former classmates from Smith College nor her fellow women from North Carolina largely supported the movement.

Despite both the Goldsboro Women's Club and the North Carolina Federation of Women's Clubs lacking focus on politics and women's suffrage, Weil continued to have an interest in women's suffrage that had first been sparked through her participation in the mock presidential election of 1900 which she and her classmates had participated in.

In 1914 Weil co-founded the Goldsboro Equal Suffrage Association and became the association's first president. Also during 1914, Weil was elected as first vice-president of the North Carolina Federation of Women's Clubs and received the nomination for president from the same organization. Facing the possibility of holding the title of President in two influential and controversial women's organizations in North Carolina, Weil declined the Federation's nomination in order to focus on women's suffrage.

Between 1919 and 1920 women's suffrage associations in the United States were involved in the final push for the passage of what would become the Nineteenth Amendment to the Constitution of the United States. In order to secure the right of women to vote. Weil continued her work with women's suffrage associations, gathering signatures and endorsements. When the Nineteenth Amendment to the United States Constitution was passed in 1920, prohibiting the state and federal governments denying the right to vote on the basis of sex, Weil was serving as President of the North Carolina Equal Suffrage League. Despite Weil's and the women's clubs hard work in North Carolina in support of the Nineteenth Amendment, the North Carolina state legislature refused to ratify the amendment, instead, the state of Tennessee cast the final vote to gain women the right to vote in the United States. Weil responded to the North Carolina's rejection of the amendment in a letter;

As you know, our fight for ratification by the North Carolina legislature is over. We were unsuccessful in our efforts. Our North Carolina men have refused to ratify.” In closing, she called upon the women “to hold together whatever local organization you have. We shall need it to carry out the work that lies before us.”

Weil continued working to improve the political system. In 1920, she established the North Carolina League of Women Voters, dedicated to educating women about the political system and their newly won rights. She also became a leader in the Legislative Council of North Carolina, organized to advance progressive social reforms. In 1922, she made headlines when she destroyed stacks of previously marked ballots intended to be stuffed into ballot boxes to fix an election.

Not until 1971 did North Carolina endorse the amendment, just 24 days before Weil died.

== Politics ==
Weil continued to work to improve women's statuses in the United States. In 1920 she became president of the North Carolina League of Women Voters, which focused on educating women on their right to vote and encouraging women to take a part in public affairs. Weil also played an active role in the newly formed Legislative Council of North Carolina Women, presenting a legislative program to the North Carolina General Assembly. Her program called for the age of consent to be raised to 16, protection for mother's pensions, censorship for moving pictures, and funding for the Stonewall Jackson Manual Training and Industrial School, and Samarcand Manor State Home and Industrial School.

Weil encountered opposition to her fight to secure a secret ballot and private voting rooms. In 1922 when she arrived at the polls to vote and discovered her ballot had been marked, subsequently tore both the ballot in question and other marked ballots to shreds. This event, in 1922, sparked the editor of the Raleigh Times to mention Weil's name as a possible candidate for the United States Congress. Weil, in a letter to the Raleigh Times editor, July 29, 1922, denied that as a possibility, stating:

"It has seemed needless to deny the truth of the groundless rumor concerning my running for Congress from the Third District on the Republican ticket. However, since the rumor persists in recurring in the columns of the press, perhaps it is well that I state definitely that I am not considering—nor have I ever considered—running for Congress on the Republican, Democratic, Farm-Labor, Socialist, Independent, or any other ticket."

Throughout the 1920s Weil continued her work in encouraging women to vote, visiting communities, giving speeches, and financially supporting the clubs she was involved in.

== Social work ==
Leading into the Great Depression Weil was president of the Goldsboro Bureau of Social Service and chair of the Decisions Committee. Weil was also involved in New Deal relief efforts when she was appointed as a Director of Federal Public Relief Work.

Influenced by her work as a social worker in North Carolina's impoverished communities, Weil supported the idea of a social welfare program. She also supported birth control as a solution to eliminate poverty.

Weil also spent a great deal of time fighting for labor reform in North Carolina. In 1930, Weil was a leading participant in a group of progressive citizens who issued a manifesto in support of collective bargaining and free speech; nearly one-third of the manifesto's 439 signatories were women. In 1931, the women's Legislative Council finally won shorter hours for women workers, the prohibition of night work, and other industrial reforms.

== Civil rights ==
Weil grew up in the post-reconstruction era South. Weil's hometown of Goldsboro, North Carolina, had been the location of a Civil War battle due to its proximity to a railroad junction. The Battle of Goldsboro Bridge occurred on December 17, 1862, and concluded with a Union victory and an estimated 220 casualties.

Throughout the 1920s Weil financially supported African Americans involved in education and supported interracial efforts.

Weil first immersed herself in civil rights work in 1930.

Weil's dedication to social justice and equality led her to, in 1930 travel to Atlanta to attend the Anti-Lynching Conference for Southern White Women. This conference sparked the creation of the Association of Southern Women for the Prevention of Lynching, which Weil also joined. Weil and her fellow activists in these groups challenged the idea that white southern women needed to be protected from black men through frequent lynchings.

In 1932 Weil who was appointed by the Governor of North Carolina to serve on the North Carolina Commission on Interracial Cooperation, a commission that sought to improve race relations, served the commission and its successor commission for the next 25 years. Involved in the commission, Weil sought to improve legal, economic, political, and educational equality for black Americans.

Over the next 30 years, Weil continued her involvement in civil rights, which included her organization, in 1963, of the Bi-Racial Council in her home, her opposition to segregation and her donation of money for a pool for local African Americans after the local pool was closed to them. On March 14, 1965, Weil described segregation as "separate but by no means equal," illustrating her long dedication to civil rights.

== Religion ==
The Jewish religion and traditions Weil learned in her childhood influenced her social activism in her later life. Weil was involved in teaching Sunday School, conducting adult Bible studies, and working with the Temple Sisterhood. Weil's travels put her into contact with other Jewish women who strengthened Weil's progressive opinion. One such friend was her cousin, Rosa Kaufman, who had been influenced by Pauline Steinem, whose granddaughter Gloria would become a feminist leader. Weil, influenced by her mother's beliefs, joined the Daughters of Zion in 1912. The founder of Daughters of Zion, Henrietta Szold, an American Zionist, was a friend of Weil's mother, and Szold's involvement with social work resounded with Weil's social progressivism. The Daughters of Zion would later change their name to Hadassah: The Women's Zionist Organization of America, and Weil would serve as president of her local and regional group for the organization.

Weil's aunt, Sarah Weil, helped found the North Carolina Association of Jewish Women in 1921. Weil would serve three terms as president of the Association, beginning in 1924, and serve as board member for the rest of her life. Sarah Weil's goal was to unite Jewish women in North Carolina, regardless of background welcoming both orthodox and reform members. Weil's work with the North Carolina Association of Jewish Women took her to small towns across North Carolina, forming relationships with women across the state. Following the success of the American Women's Suffrage movement, the women in the North Carolina Association of Jewish Women called for equal congregation membership, which was given in Greensboro at the Temple Emanuel in 1923 and at the Oheb Sholom in 1924.

Weil also sat on the board of the North Carolina Home for the Jewish Aged, worked for the National Federation of Temple Sisterhoods, and helped to raise money for numerous Jewish charities. In the 1930s and 1940s, she and her mother devoted much time and effort to rescuing Jewish refugees from persecution in Europe.

In the late 1960s, Weil wrote an essay in which she criticized those who believed religious individuals should confine themselves to ""matters" of religion, that is theology, church creed, church attendance, the prospect of heaven or hell" and she continued with her own belief that, "In my definition, religion includes the whole of life: one's beliefs, one's attitudes to society, one's behavior ." Within the same essay, Weil demonstrated her opinion that Judaism called for morality in all areas of an individual's life, stating, "My religion demands the same honesty, fairness, reliability, in all one's relations." Weil's emphasis on moral and ethical behavior being a part of her religious identity was prominent throughout her life with her social service.

== Relationships ==
Despite her having suitors, Weil never received any formal marriage proposals and never married. Weil maintained strong close relationships with her college friends and built relationships with the women she was closest to through her work.

== Later life ==
Weil continued her commitment to social service. In 1968, she had already served ten years on the county library board and continued her service.

Weil also financially supported philanthropist efforts within her community. She donated several thousand dollars to the Herman Weil Memorial Fund and the Medical School at the University of North Carolina at Chapel Hill.

== Legacy ==
In 1964 Weil received a medal from Smith College, the medal was reserved for distinguished alumni and Weil was chosen for her work in public service.

The public library in Goldsboro contains the "Gertrude Weil Auditorium," named after Weil.

According to the Jewish Women's Archive, Weil was: "Inspired by Jewish teachings that 'justice, mercy, [and] goodness were not to be held in a vacuum, but practiced in our daily lives,' Weil stood courageously at the forefront of a wide range of progressive and often controversial causes, including women's suffrage, labor reform and civil rights. She worked tirelessly to extend political, economic and social opportunities to those long denied them."

== Comparisons ==
Weil was compared to Ruby Diamond from Tallahassee, Florida. Both were progressive women from the upper-class from the late 19th century. Both were college educated, unmarried, and well-known philanthropists who lived in their hometown for their long lives. Diamond was more conservative and only known within her local community.

== Death ==
Gertrude Weil died on May 30, 1971, in her hometown of Goldsboro, North Carolina at the age of 91. Her burial place is located at the Willow Dale Cemetery in Goldsboro in the Jewish section.
