= Beaver Dam (Knightdale, North Carolina) =

Historic house in North Carolina, United States

- U.S. National Register of Historic Places
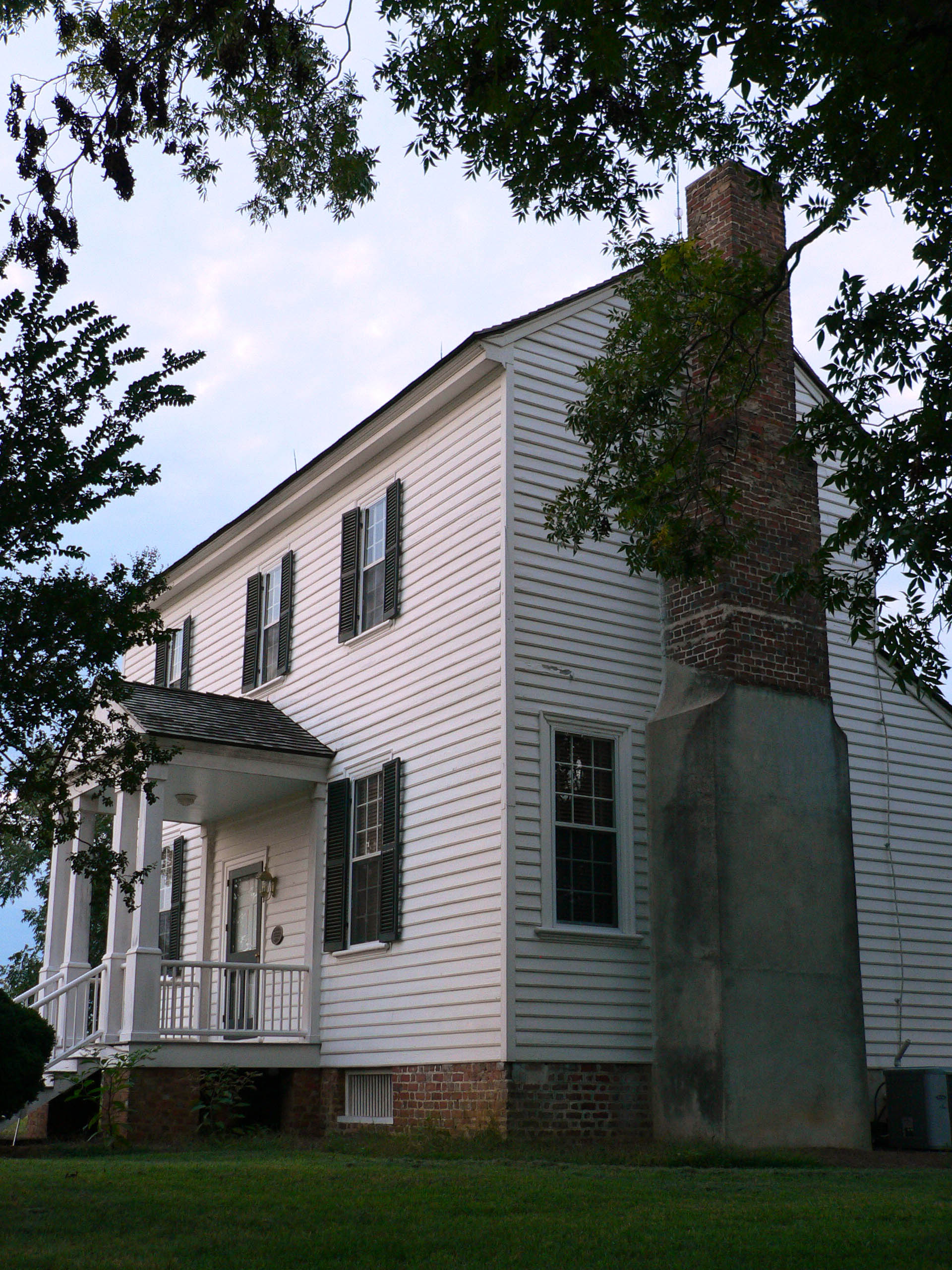
- Beaver Dam viewed from the southeast

- Location within North Carolina Location within the United States
- Location: 7081 Forestville Road, Knightdale, North Carolina
- Coordinates: 35°48′32.6″N 78°29′06.8″W
- Built: c. 1810
- Architectural style: Federal
- MPS: Wake County MPS
- NRHP reference No.: 86003529
- Added to NRHP: January 6, 1987

Beaver Dam is an antebellum plantation house located on the northern edge of present-day Knightdale, Wake County, North Carolina. The house was built around 1810 by Col. William Hinton, brother of Charles Lewis Hinton who built the nearby Midway Plantation. At its height, the Beaver Dam plantation encompassed around 4,000 acres (1,600 ha) tended by the forced labor of about 50 enslaved people.

It was listed on the National Register of Historic Places in 1987.

In 2005, the house was purchased by Hinton Land, LLC and underwent a 6-month restoration by Lambeth Restoration, HagerSmith Architects, Williams Realty and Building Company, John Stein Painting, Western Cedar Supply, and others.

== See also ==
- List of Registered Historic Places in North Carolina
- National Register of Historic Places listings in Wake County, North Carolina
