= Knightdale, North Carolina =

- Town
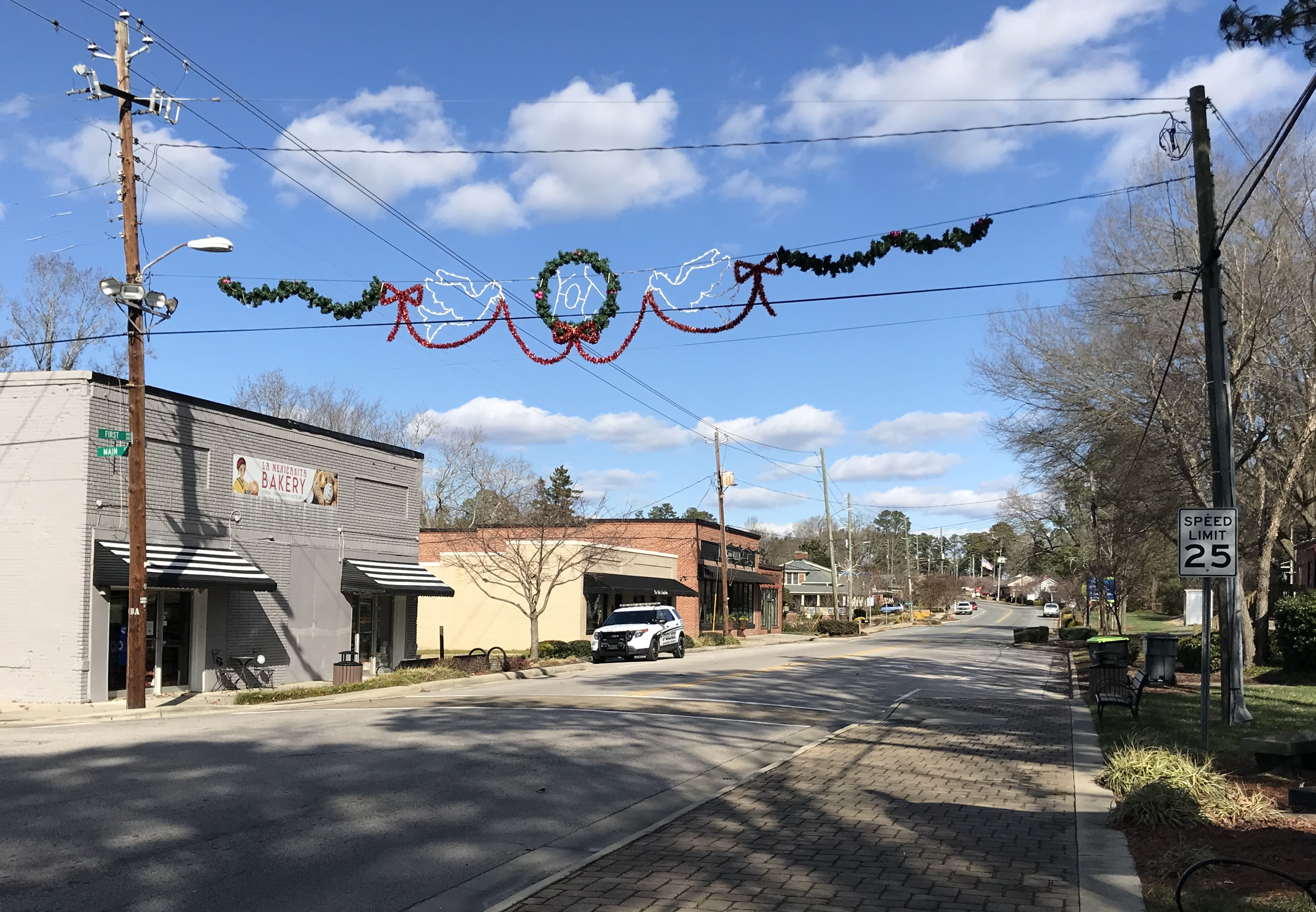
- Downtown Knightdale

- Seal Logo

- Location in Wake County and the state of North Carolina.
- Coordinates: 35°47′26″N 78°29′50″W
- Country: United States
- State: North Carolina
- County: Wake
- Incorporated: 1927

Government
  - Mayor: Jessica Day

Area
  - Total: 8.50 sq mi (22.01 km^{2})
  - Land: 8.49 sq mi (22.00 km^{2})
  - Water: 0.0077 sq mi (0.02 km^{2})
- Elevation: 249 ft (76 m)

Population (2020)
  - Total: 19,435
  - Density: 2,288/sq mi (883.5/km^{2})
- Time zone: UTC−5 (Eastern (EST))
  - Summer (DST): UTC−4 (EDT)
- ZIP code: 27545
- Area code: 919
- FIPS code: 37-36080
- GNIS feature ID: 2405958
- Website: www.knightdalenc.gov

Knightdale is a town in Wake County, North Carolina, United States. As of the 2020 census, Knightdale has a population of 19,435, up from 11,401 in 2010. The U.S. Census Bureau estimates the town's population to be 17,843, as of July 1, 2019. Knightdale's population grew 10.4% from 2010 to 2013, making it the second fastest-growing community in the Research Triangle region for that time period.

Named for Henry Haywood Knight, a local Wake County landowner who donated land to found a railroad depot, the town was incorporated in 1927. By the 1960s, the economic center of town migrated from the area around the rail depot to U.S. Highway 64, which ran north of downtown Knightdale. Since 1990, the community has experienced a significant population boom, getting its own high school in 2004, and a new freeway bypass in 2006. Since 2010, several new shopping centers have sprung up along Business U.S. 64 (Knightdale Boulevard), the main thoroughfare through town. A large destination park, Knightdale Station Park, opened in 2013 just to the east of the old downtown area as part of a revitalization effort, the park was expanded in 2018 to add an amphitheater. Interstate 540 passes directly through the town before its eastern terminus at Interstate 87, while Interstate 87 (in concurrency with US 64) travels along a southern freeway bypass.

== History ==
=== Early history ===
In 1700, the Lords Proprietor of the Carolina Colony hired John Lawson to explore the area. He began his 1,000-mile (1,600 km) trek near present-day Charleston, South Carolina, and according to his diary, passed through the area sometime in February 1701. He wrote about a meeting with the Tuscarora Native American tribe on the banks of the Neuse River, and with the help of an interpreter, Lawson made peace with the Tuscarora.

After receiving the report from Lawson, the King of England began to apportion these lands to willing settlers. In 1730, John Hinton settled in what would one day be called Knightdale in an area near the Neuse River, not far from where Hodge Road and Old Faison Road now intersect.

As more settlers arrived, the colonial government appointed Hinton to be the Justice of the Peace for Craven County. Eventually, Johnston County was carved out of Craven County in the 1750s and Wake County carved out of Johnston County in 1771.

When the American Revolution began, Hinton switched his allegiance to the colonials. He became a military leader and played a key role in the first battle of the American Revolution fought on North Carolina soil, the Battle of Moore's Creek Bridge. Hinton owned seven plantations in the Knightdale area, of which three are still intact: The Oaks, Midway, and Beaver Dam.

=== 19th century ===
After independence, the population of the area began to increase, with farmers growing products such as tobacco and cotton. Slaves were used at Midway Plantation and Beaver Dam Plantation in Knightdale. There are unmarked grave plots for slaves throughout Knightdale. Although documentation of grave sites has been lost, the burials remain a significant part of the local landscape.

During the Civil War, the Confederate and Union armies were present in the area. The Clay Hill and Midway plantations saw the greatest damage, and after the war had ended, the residents began to rebuild. During this time, nearby Raleigh experienced a population boom. As a result, local leaders redrew the map of Wake County and divided it into townships. The area that became Knightdale was located in St. Matthew's Township, where it still is today.

For many years the Knightdale area was a crossroads served only by a post office. By the end of the 19th century, locals decided there was a need to establish a town. Henry Haywood Knight donated some of his land holdings in the area to the Norfolk and Southern Railroad Company in order to entice the company to build a railroad that would provide freight and passenger service. Although Knight did not live to see the railroad arrive in Knightdale, not long after his death in 1904, the railroad finally came to the community that would bear his name.

=== 20th century ===
After the railroad and depot were built, the area began to develop quickly. Norfolk and Southern moved families into the community to take care of the railroad, and many of the older homes that exist today in Knightdale were built specifically for the use of railroad workers and their families. The first railroad stationmaster's house can still be seen along the tracks on Railroad Street.

As the community continued to grow, Knightdale received its articles of official incorporation from the North Carolina Legislature on March 9, 1927, with the first mayor being Bennett L. Wall.

On February 7, 1940, a fire broke out in the center of town. The townspeople turned out to help extinguish the fire, but the fire was not brought under control until firefighters arrived from Raleigh with an adequate water supply. Several businesses and homes were destroyed and the townspeople rebuilt the historic downtown area.

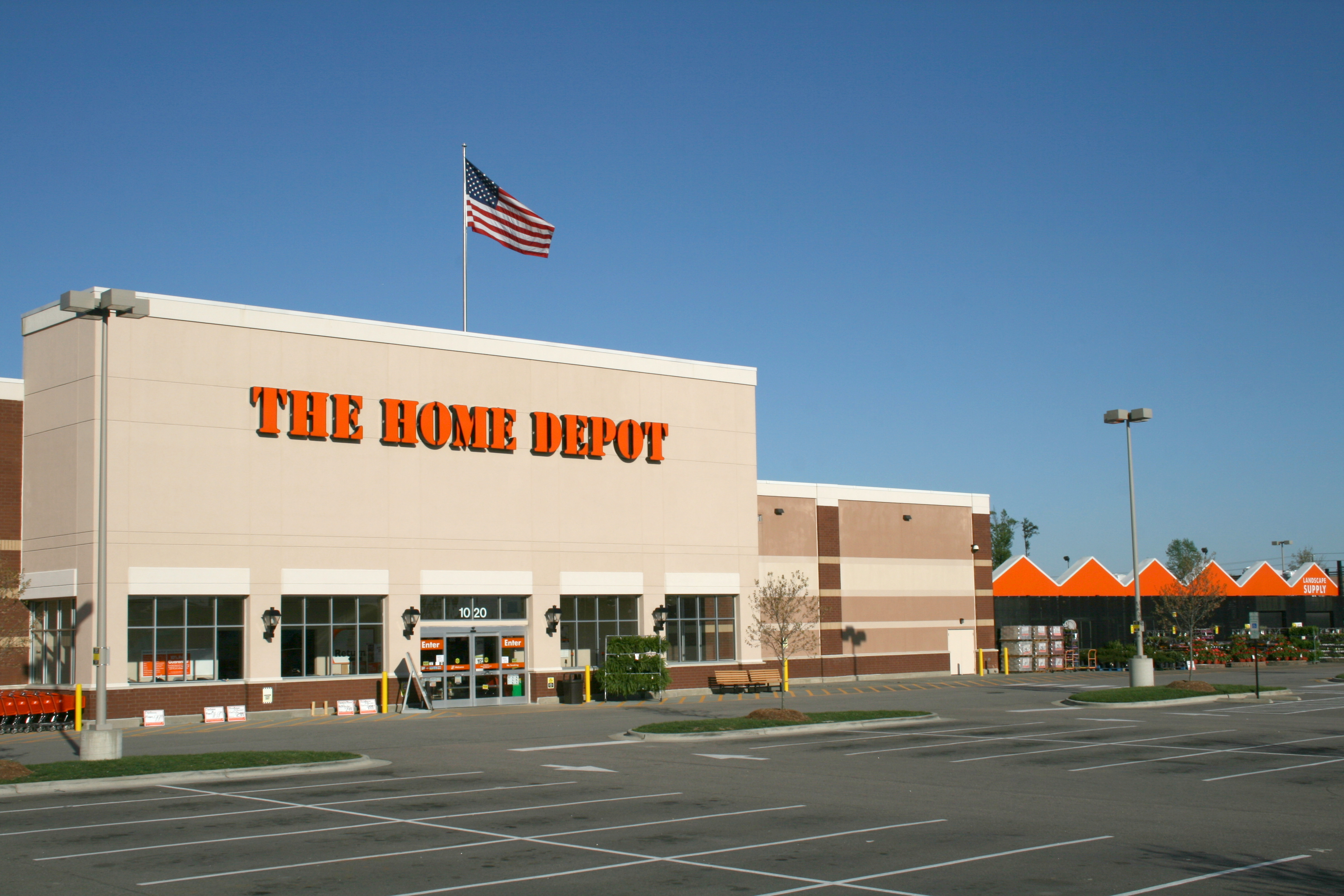
Home Depot hardware store on US 64 in Knightdale

After World War II, the population of Knightdale grew at a steady pace, thanks to the Baby Boom. The corner drugstore, the bank, and the barber shop located on First Avenue served as places of business, as well as places for social gatherings. Movies were often shown on the wall of the old bank building, which is located at the intersection of First Avenue and Main Street. In 1952 a municipal water system was installed.

Beginning in the 1960s the majority of new businesses in Knightdale began locating along US 64. With the addition of the Mingo Creek sewer outfall in the late 1980s, development on the south side of US 64 began. Subdivisions such as Parkside, Planter's Walk and Mingo Creek subdivisions were built, rapidly increasing the town's population. Between 1990 and 2000 Knightdale's population increased from 1,700 to more than 6,000 residents, making it the seventh fastest-growing town in North Carolina.

Frankie Muniz, a popular television and film actor, grew up in Knightdale. He started his acting career performing the role of Tiny Tim in "A Christmas Carol" for three years. Nominations for his performances include the Hollywood Reporter Young Star Award and the Young Artist of Hollywood Award. He currently resides in Scottsdale, Arizona.

=== 21st century ===
In 2002, Knightdale's first female mayor, Jeanne Milliken Bonds, was elected.

There are multiple historic sites in Knightdale that are listed on the National Register of Historic Places including: Beaver Dam, Henry H. and Bettie S. Knight Farm, and Midway Plantation House and Outbuildings.

== Law and government ==
Knightdale has a Council-manager government. Under this system the citizens elect a mayor and five council members as the town's governing body. The council then appoints the Town Manager who serves at the discretion of the council. Council members are elected to four-year terms. Three of the members are elected in one year, and the two remaining members and the mayor are elected two years later. The mayor, as the principal elected official of the town, provides leadership to the governing body and the community, and presides over board meetings.

The current mayor is Jessica Day, and current town council members include Latatious Morris (Mayor Pro Tem), Mark Swan, Stephen Morgan, Ben McDonald, and Steve Evans.

== Geography ==
According to the United States Census Bureau, the town has a total area of 6.2 square miles (16.1 km^{2}), all land.

Knightdale is located in the northeast central region of North Carolina, where the North American Piedmont and Atlantic Coastal Plain regions meet. This area is known as the "Fall Line" because it marks the elevation inland at which waterfalls begin to appear in creeks and rivers. Its central Piedmont location and access to large highways places Knightdale a little over two hours northwest of Wrightsville Beach, NC by car and four hours east of the Great Smoky Mountains.

=== Climate ===
Knightdale has a moderate subtropical climate, with moderate temperatures in the spring, fall, and winter. Summers are typically hot with high humidity. Winter highs generally range in the low 50s°F (10 to 13 °C) with lows in the low-to-mid 30s°F (-2 to 2 °C), although an occasional 60 °F (15 °C) or warmer winter day is not uncommon. Spring and fall days usually reach the low-to-mid 70s°F (low 20s°C), with lows at night in the lower 50s°F (10 to 14 °C). Summer daytime highs often reach the upper 80s to low 90s°F (29 to 35 °C). The rainiest months are July and August.

== Demographics ==
Historical population
Census	Pop.	Note	%±
1930	243		—
1940	352		44.9%
1950	461		31.0%
1960	622		34.9%
1970	815		31.0%
1980	985		20.9%
1990	1,884		91.3%
2000	5,958		216.2%
2010	11,401		91.4%
2020	19,435		70.5%
2025 (est.)	23,144	▲	19.1%
U.S. Decennial Census

=== 2020 census ===
As of the 2020 census, Knightdale had a population of 19,435. The median age was 35.1 years. 25.6% of residents were under the age of 18 and 9.0% of residents were 65 years of age or older. For every 100 females there were 87.0 males, and for every 100 females age 18 and over there were 82.5 males age 18 and over.

99.9% of residents lived in urban areas, while 0.1% lived in rural areas.

There were 7,320 households and 4,114 families in Knightdale, of which 39.2% had children under the age of 18 living in them. Of all households, 47.3% were married-couple households, 14.2% were households with a male householder and no spouse or partner present, and 31.9% were households with a female householder and no spouse or partner present. About 23.1% of all households were made up of individuals and 5.1% had someone living alone who was 65 years of age or older.

There were 7,635 housing units, of which 4.1% were vacant. The homeowner vacancy rate was 1.5% and the rental vacancy rate was 5.9%.

Knightdale racial composition
Race	Number	Percentage
Black or African American (non-Hispanic)	8,131	41.84%
White (non-Hispanic)	7,175	36.92%
Native American	78	0.4%
Asian	642	3.3%
Pacific Islander	16	0.08%
Other/Mixed	983	5.06%
Hispanic or Latino	2,410	12.4%

=== 2010 census ===
As of the census of 2010, there were 11,406 people and 3,754 households in the town. The median value of owner-occupied homes in Knightdale was $174,300. The Homeownership Rate was 71.7%.

The population density was 1,837 people per square mile. There were 2,352 housing units at an average density of 877.4 per square mile (338.8/km^{2}). The racial makeup of the town was 50% White, 38.3% African American, 11.4% Hispanic or Latino, 1.7% Asian, 0.6% Native American, 0.01% Pacific Islander, and 3.5% from two or more races.

There were 3,754 households, out of which the Census counted 2,760 as family households; 45.9% of households had children under the age of 18 living with them, 61.0% were married couples living together, 7.3% had a female householder with no husband present. The average household size was 2.89 and the average family size was 3.47.

Knightdale's median age was 31.6 years. Largest brackets by age include 35–44 years (20.6%); 25–34 years (18.2%); 45–54 years (12.2%); 10–14 years (11.7%). Females made up 54.6% of the population, while men made up 45.4%.

=== Income and poverty ===
Median income for a household was $75,285 in 2011; by comparison, Median income in North Carolina for the same time period was $46,291. Per capita income for the town was $27,938. For the period 2007-2011, about 5.9% of the population lived below the poverty line; by comparison, 16.1% of North Carolina residents lived below the poverty line.

=== Education ===
Among adults age 25 and older, 41.2% had a bachelor's degree or higher; 93% had earned at least a high school degree.

== Education ==
=== Public education ===
Knightdale's public schools are administered by the Wake County Public School System, the 19th largest school district in the country. Students in Knightdale attend the following schools, some of which are located in neighboring communities:

==== Elementary schools ====
- Beaverdam Elementary
- Forestville Elementary
- Hodge Road Elementary
- Knightdale Elementary
- Lake Myra Elementary
- Lockhart Elementary

==== Middle schools ====
- Carnage Middle School
- Neuse River Middle School
- Wendell Middle School

==== High schools ====
- Knightdale High School
- East Wake High School

=== Higher education ===
Knightdale has no post-secondary schools. Nearby institutions, all located in nearby Raleigh, include North Carolina State University, Meredith College, Shaw University, Saint Augustine's College and Wake Technical Community College. The Southeastern Baptist Theological Seminary is in Wake Forest, and the Southeastern Free Will Baptist College is located in nearby Wendell.

=== Library ===
The Wake County Public Library System operates a branch facility, the East Regional Library, in Knightdale.

== Parks and recreation ==
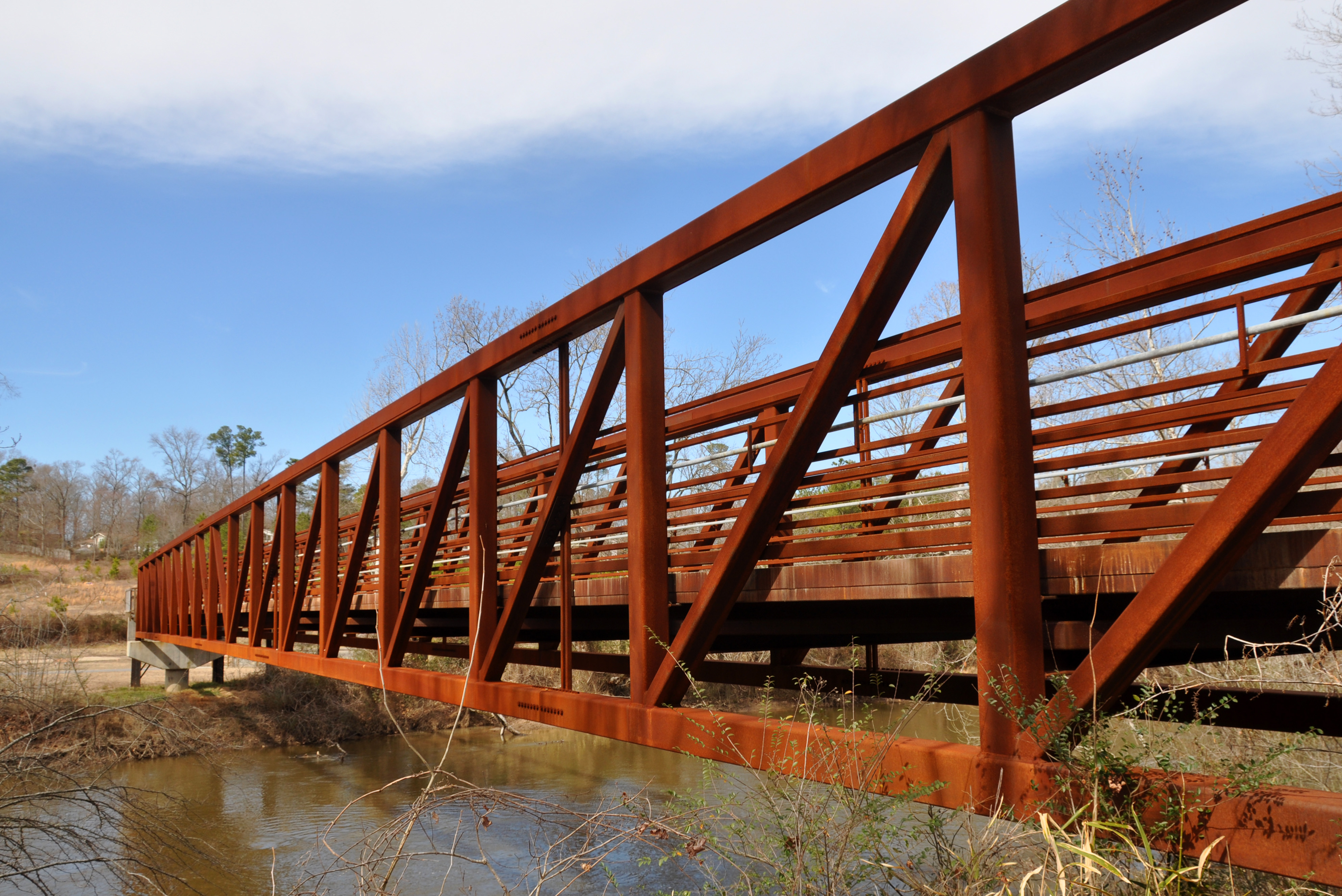
Bridge that connects Knightdale's Mingo Creek Greenway to Raleigh's Neuse River Greenway.

Knightdale is served by two parks and one community center. The Eugene F. Harper Memorial Park is located downtown. The Knightdale Recreation Center is attached to Forestville Elementary's gym. The Knightdale Environmental Park is a trail system that is located in the southern portion of Knightdale.

=== Knightdale Station Park ===
Knightdale Station Park, adjacent to a large housing development also named Knightdale Station, occupies a large tract of land on the east side of town, across First Avenue from many of the older businesses in the original central business district of Knightdale. The park was opened in three phases, in 2013, 2014, and 2018 and currently features walking trails, a dog park, a large playground, a splash pad, several soccer fields, a covered exhibition area, an amphitheater for performances, a nine-hole disc golf course, and several large open fields and forested areas.

=== Mingo Creek Greenway ===
The Mingo Creek Greenway was completed in July 2014. The 3.5 mile, 10-foot wide trail connects Mingo Creek Park in the east to the 33-mile City of Raleigh's Neuse River Trail in the west. The two trails connect over a newly opened pedestrian bridge that spans the Neuse River.

== Transportation ==
=== Air ===
- Commercial air service for Knightdale is served by Raleigh-Durham International Airport (RDU), which is located approximately 27.9 miles from town in northwestern Wake County.
- A small general aviation known as Raleigh East Airport lies at the eastern edge of Knightdale.

=== Rail ===
- Knightdale Amtrak's closest passenger train service is approximately 12.8 miles west of town in Raleigh.

=== Bus ===
- The Triangle Transit Authority operates the Knightdale-Raleigh Express (KRX) which connects Knightdale commuters to municipal bus systems in Raleigh, Durham and Chapel Hill.

=== Roads ===
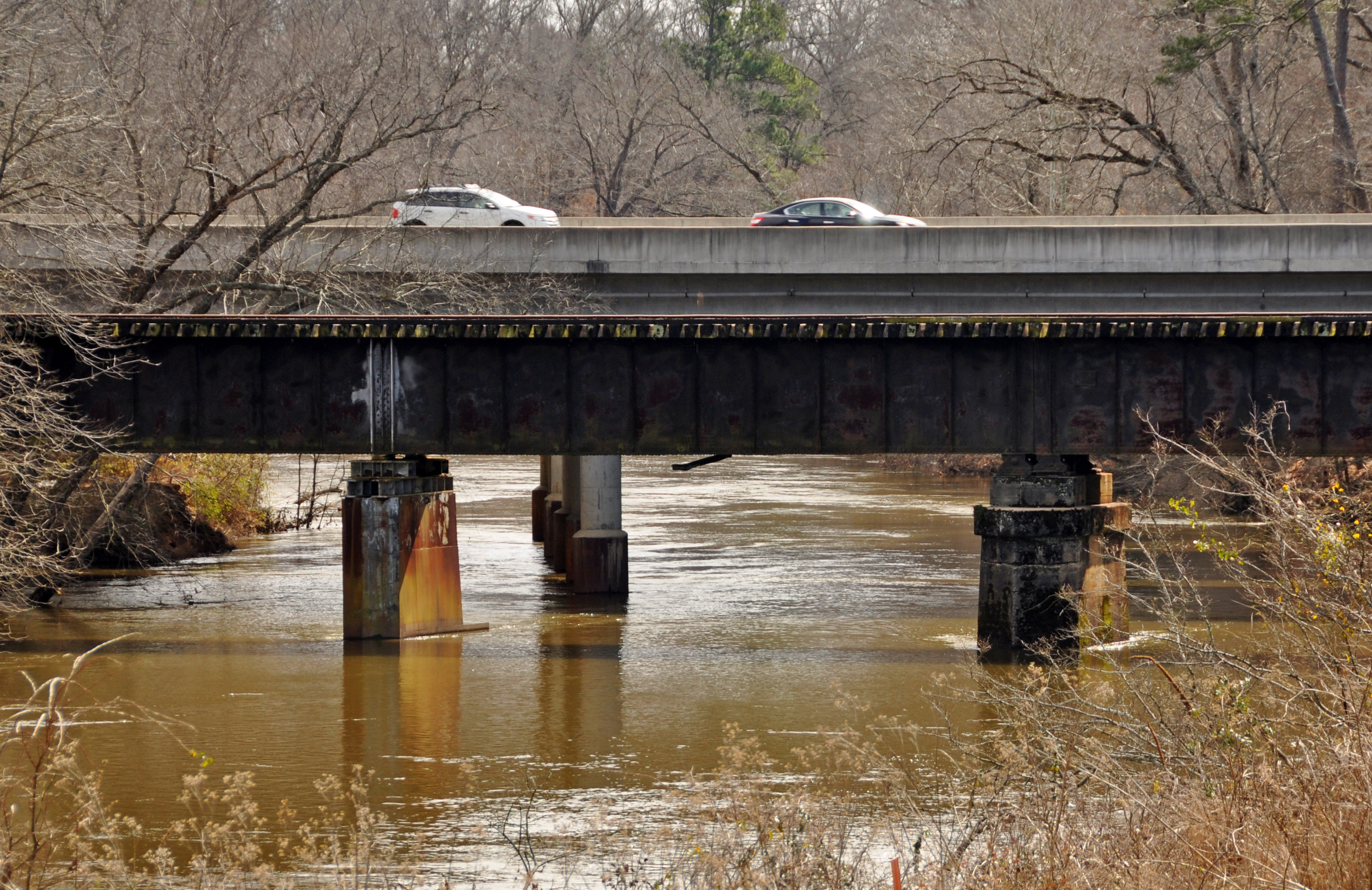
Knightdale Bypass (I-87/U.S. Hwy 64/264) bridge over the Neuse River.

Major routes through and near Knightdale include:

- I-87, US 64, and US 264 run concurrently along the Knightdale Bypass south and east of town. Knightdale can be accessed via the Hodge Road (Exit 6), Smithfield Road (Exit 9), Wendell Falls Boulevard (Exit 11), and US 64 Business (Exit 13) interchanges.
- I-540 runs along the west side of town. Knightdale can be accessed via the US 64 Business interchange (Exit 24).
- US 64 Bus., known locally as Knightdale Boulevard, is a former alignment of US 64/US 264 and forms the main commercial district in town. It connects Knightdale to Raleigh and Wendell.

== Notable people ==
- Ronnie Ash, track and field athlete specializing in hurdles, competed at the 2016 Summer Olympics
- Burkheart Ellis, track and field sprinter, represented Barbados at the 2016 Summer Olympics
- Jesse Ferguson, heavyweight professional boxer
- Rachelle Friedman, blogger
- J. T. Knott, politician who served as a Wake County Commissioner
- Joe Lewis, kickboxer, full contact karate fighter, and actor
- Jeanne Milliken Bonds, politician who served as Mayor of Knightdale
- Frankie Muniz, actor, best known for playing the title character in Malcolm in the Middle (lived in Knightdale)
- Stan Okoye, professional basketball player
- Barbara Pierre, track and field sprinter, represented Haiti at the 2008 Summer Olympics
