= Thomas B. Bullene =

American politician and businessman (1828–1894)

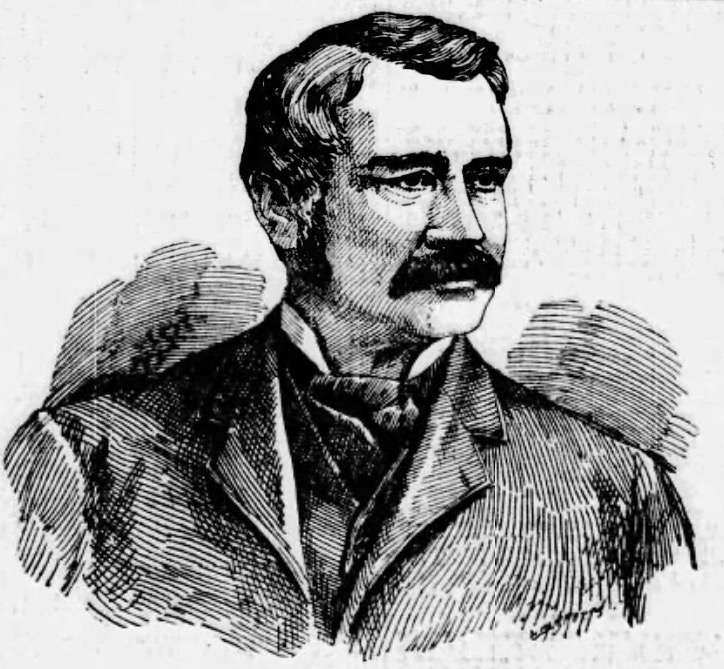

22nd Mayor of Kansas City
- In office 1882 – 1883
- Preceded by: Daniel A. Frink
- Succeeded by: James Gibson

Personal details
- Born: Thomas Brockway Bullene; August 10, 1828 Oswego County, New York, US
- Died: December 4, 1894 (aged 66) Kansas City, Missouri, US
- Resting place: Elmwood Cemetery; Kansas City, Missouri, U.S.
- Party: Republican
- Spouse: Amarett Hickock (m. 1852; died 1883)
- Children: 4

Thomas Brockway Bullene (August 10, 1828 – December 4, 1894) was an American politician and businessman. A Republican, he served as mayor of Kansas City, Missouri from 1882 to 1883. He was one of the original owners of the Emery, Bird, Thayer Dry Goods Company.

== Early life ==
Thomas Brockway Bullene was born on August 10, 1828, in Oswego County, New York, to John and Susan Bullene. At the age of seven, Bullene and his family moved to Kenosha, Wisconsin. He grew up on a farm and had a "pioneer childhood".

== Career ==
Around 1849, Bullene opened a country store in Lyons, Wisconsin with his older brother Lathrop. In 1856, Bullene moved to Independence, Iowa and operated a store there. In 1863, Bullene followed his brother Lathrop to Lawrence, Kansas. He bought out the stock of Kansas City, Missouri store owner William Gillis in the Gillis & Coates store. Bullene and his brother, along with Kersey Coates, started the store Coates & Bullene at Main Street and Missouri Avenue to supply travelers on the Santa Fe Trail. In 1867, W. E. Emery joined the business and in 1870–1871, the Moore brothers bought an interest in the establishment. The store would grow into the Emery, Bird, Thayer & Co. department store.

Bullene joined Kansas City's first volunteer fire brigade. He served as the first president of the Kansas City Humane Society. He was active with the Kansas City Board of Trade and helped found the Kansas City Club which is headquartered where his home stood.

Bullene was a Republican. Bullene served in the city council of Kansas City, Missouri from 1880 to 1881 and was elected as mayor of Kansas City, Missouri from 1882 to 1883. He unsuccessfully ran for U.S. Congress in 1888.

Bullene wrote a fairy story for his daughter that was published in the Journal of Commerce in 1877.

== Personal life ==
Bullene married Amarett Hickock of Bridgeport, New York on December 29, 1852. They had one son and three daughters. His wife died in 1883. His son Fred S. Bullene was a newspaperman and worked for the Kansas City Times, Kansas City Journal and Kansas City Star.

Bullene died on December 4, 1894, in Kansas City. He was buried at Elmwood Cemetery in Kansas City.

He kept many journals which can be viewed at the Kansas Public Library.

== See also ==
- List of mayors of Kansas City

Political offices
Preceded by Daniel A. Frink	Mayor of Kansas City, Missouri; 1882–1883	Succeeded by James Gibson
