= Wofford =

Wofford may refer to:

== People with the surname ==
- Toni Morrison (born Chloe Ardelia Wofford, 1931–2019), American writer
- Dan Wofford, American politician
- Harris Wofford (1926–2019), American politician from Pennsylvania
- James C. Wofford (1944–2023), American equestrian
- Jenifer K. Wofford, American artist
- John Wofford (1931–2021), American equestrian
- John W. Wofford (politician) (1837–1907), American jurist and politician from Missouri and Georgia
- John William Wofford (1898–1955), American equestrian
- Mike Wofford (1938–2025), American jazz pianist and composer
- Norma-Jean Wofford (c. 1942–2005), American guitarist
- Thomas A. Wofford (1908–1978), American politician from South Carolina
- William T. Wofford (1824–1884), American military officer

== Places ==
=== United States ===
- Wofford Heights, California, census-designated place
- Wofford, Kentucky, unincorporated community
- Wofford College, Spartanburg, South Carolina
