= Annie Ridenbaugh Bird =

American businesswoman

Annie Ridenbaugh Bird (1856– January 29, 1937) was an American philanthropist and the president of Emery, Bird, Thayer & Co., a dry goods company, from 1920 until her death in 1937.

== Personal life ==
Bird was originally from St. Joseph, Missouri, born from Mr. and Mrs. John Ridenbaugh. Her father was editor and publisher the St. Joseph Gazette.

She moved with her husband, Joseph Taylor Bird, to Kansas City, Missouri, in 1880, with whom she had a daughter named Josephine.

For three decades Bird went about living comfortable life as a wife of a prominent merchant. The last 17 years of her life was turned into upheaval when her husband died in 1918, and was left the controlling interest in her husband's business, Emery, Bird, Thayer & Co.

== Career ==
After her husbands death and Bird was left the controlling interest, the company considered her vital to keeping things running. She always followed the businesses dealings closely, which proved her useful to the company. This led to her being elected president in 1920, but thought of herself as a trustee. She would spend her hours working by walking the store's floors, moving throughout the building.

Bird stayed active in the company until her death in 1937. Renamed Emery, Bird, Thayer, & Co. in 1894, stayed open until 1068 but later was demolished in 1973.

== Philanthropy ==
Bird, along with her daughter, gave Mercy Hospital a property deed in 1500 block of McGee St. in 1924. Money from the sale of the property allowed for the construction of the Joseph T. Bird Nurses' Home and School of Child Nursing in June 1927.

== Death ==
Bird, aged 80, died after contracting pneumonia following being sick with influenza on January 29, 1937. She died at 7:00 p.m. in her home Elmhurst, on 36th St. and Broadway, with a broken hip as well.
