= KCBT =

KCBT may refer to:

- KCBT-LD, a low-power digital television station on Channel 34, licensed to serve Bakersfield, California, United States.
- An abbreviation for the Kansas City Board of Trade.
