= Mayor of Kansas City, Missouri =

Head executive of the Kansas City government

Mayor of Kansas City
- Flag of Kansas City, Missouri

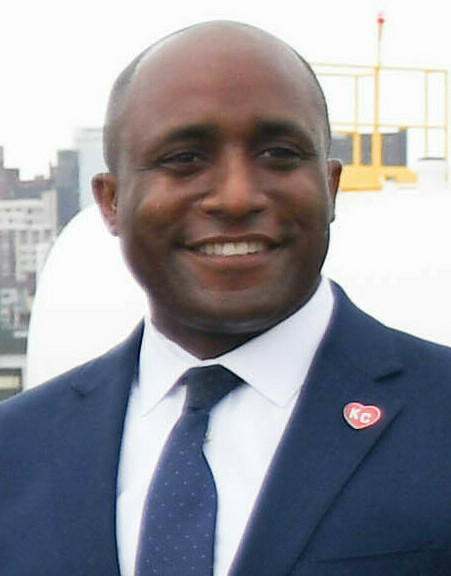
- Incumbent; Quinton Lucas since August 1, 2019
- Style: His Honor
- Residence: Private residence
- Term length: Four years
- Inaugural holder: William S. Gregory
- Formation: 19th century
- Website: Office of the Mayor

Party affiliation^{[A]}
Party	Mayors
Democratic	37
Republican	20
Whig	1

The mayor of Kansas City, Missouri is the highest official in the Kansas City, Missouri Municipal Government.

Since the 1920s, the city has had a council-manager government in which a city manager runs most of the day-to-day operations of the city. Unlike most cities of its size, by charter Kansas City has a "weak-mayor" system, in which most of the power is formally vested in the city council. However, the mayor is very influential in drafting and guiding public policy. The mayor presides over all city council meetings and has a vote on the council. Due to these combined factors the mayor holds a significant amount of de facto power in the city government.

Since 1946, mayors of Kansas City have been elected by the voters of Kansas City to four-year terms and are limited to two terms under the city's charter. Mayors initially served one-year terms until 1890 when they began serving two-year terms. According to the City Charter, city elections are non-partisan, meaning that the mayor and city council run without nominal political affiliation. The mayor of Kansas City occupies an office on the 29th floor of the Kansas City City Hall, the building's highest floor. Eleven of Kansas City's mayors are interred in Elmwood Cemetery. The current mayor of Kansas City is Quinton Lucas, elected in 2019.

== Mayors ==
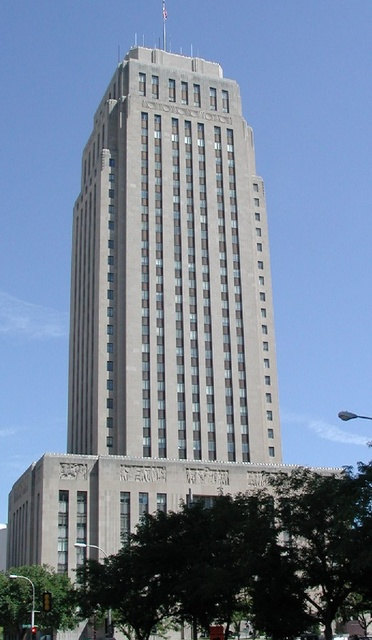
The mayor's office is on the 29th floor, the highest occupiable floor of Kansas City City Hall.

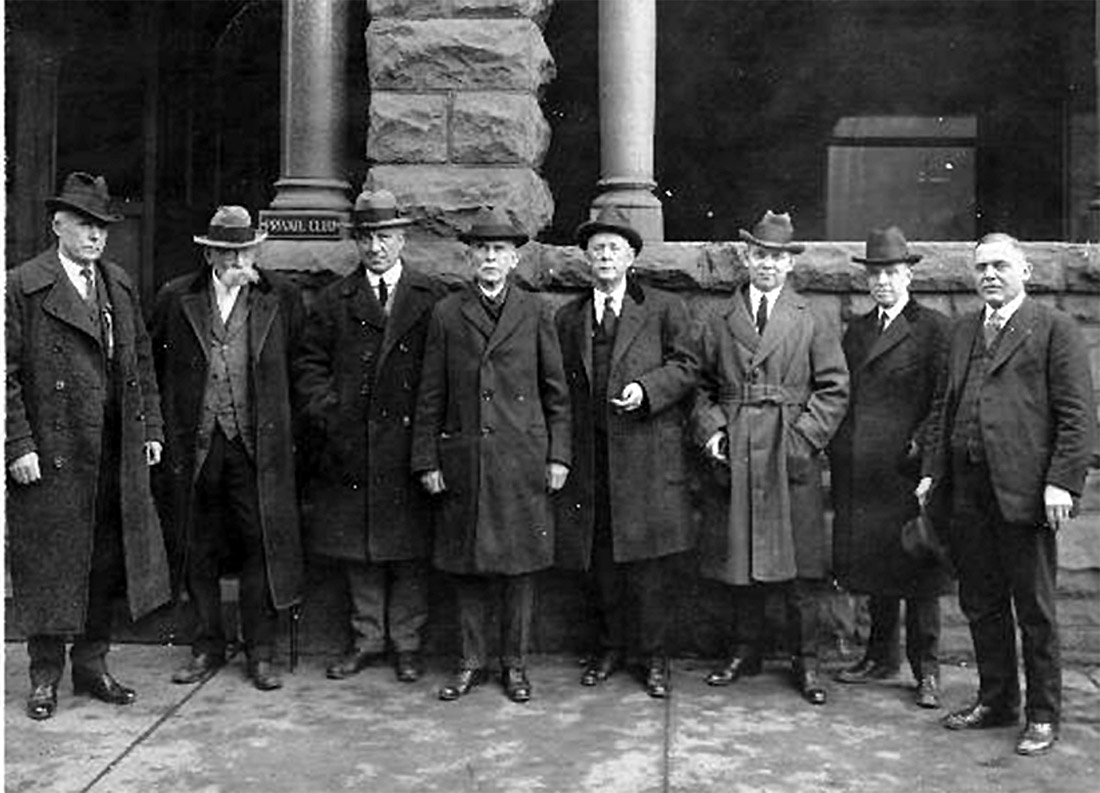
James A. Reed, George M. Shelley, Darius A. Brown, Leander J. Talbot, Thomas T. Crittenden Jr., Frank Cromwell, George H. Edwards Jr., and Samuel B. Strother at the 1923 funeral of Webster Davis

#	Image	Name	Took office	Left office	Party	Terms^{[B]}
1		William S. Gregory	April 18, 1853	February 1854	Whig	5/6
2		Johnston Lykins	February 1854	April 1855	Democratic	1 1/6
3		John Johnson	April 1855	1855	Democratic	1/2^{[C]}
4		Milton J. Payne	1855	1860	Democratic	4 1/2
5		George M.B. Maughs	1860	1861	Democratic	1
6		Robert T. Van Horn	1861	1862	Republican	1
4		Milton J. Payne	1862	1863	Democratic	1
7		William Bonnifield	1863	1863	Democratic	1/2
6		Robert T. Van Horn	1863	1865	Republican	1 1/2
8		Patrick Shannon	1865	1866	Democratic	1
9		Alexander L. Harris	1866	1867	Democratic	1
10		Edward H. Allen	1867	1868	Republican	1
9		Alexander L. Harris	1868	1869	Democratic	1
11		Francis R. Long	1869	1870	Republican	1
12		Elijah M. McGee	1870	1871	Democratic	1
13		William Warner	1871	1872	Republican	1
14		Robert H. Hunt	1872	1873	Republican	1
15		Edward Lowe Martin	1873	1874	Democratic	1
16		Smith D. Woods	1874	1875	Democratic	1
17		Turner A. Gill	1875	1877	Democratic	2
18		James W. L. Slavens	1877	1878	Republican	1
19		George M. Shelley	1878	1880	Democratic	2
20		Charles A. Chace	1880	1881	Republican	1
21		Daniel A. Frink	1881	1882	Republican	1
22		Thomas B. Bullene	1882	1883	Republican	1
23		James Gibson	1883	1884	Democratic	1
24		Leander J. Talbott	1884	1885	Democratic	1
25		John W. Moore	1885	1886	Democratic	1
26		Henry C. Kumpf	1886	1889	Republican	3
27		Joseph J. Davenport	1889	1890	Republican	1
28		Benjamin Holmes	1890	1892	Democratic	1^{[D]}
29		William S. Cowherd	1892	1894	Democratic	1
30		Webster Davis	1894	1896	Republican	1
31		James M. Jones	1896	1900	Republican	2
32		James A. Reed	1900	1904	Democratic	2
33		Jay H. Neff	1904	1906	Republican	1
34		Henry M. Beardsley	1906	1908	Republican	2
35		Thomas T. Crittenden Jr.	1908	1910	Democratic	1
36		Darius A. Brown	1910	1912	Republican	1
37		Henry L. Jost	1912	1916	Democratic	2
38		George H. Edwards	1916	1918	Republican	1
39		James Cowgill	1918	1922	Democratic	1 1/2^{[E]}
40		Sam B. Strother	1922	1922	Democratic	1/2
41		Frank H. Cromwell	1922	1924	Democratic	1
42		Albert I. Beach	1924	1930	Republican	3
43		Bryce B. Smith	1930	January 5, 1940	Democratic	4 1/2^{[F]}
44		Charles S. Keith	1940	1940	Democratic	1/2
45		John B. Gage	1940	1946	Democratic	3
46		William E. Kemp	1946	1955	Democratic	3^{[G]}
47		H. Roe Bartle	1955	1963	Democratic	2
48		Ilus W. Davis	1963	1971	Democratic	2
49		Charles B. Wheeler Jr.	1971	1979	Democratic	2
50		Richard L. Berkley	1979	1991	Republican	3
51		Emanuel Cleaver	1991	1999	Democratic	2
52		Kay Barnes	1999	2007	Democratic	2
53		Mark Funkhouser	2007	2011	Democratic	1
54		Sly James	2011	2019	Democratic	2
55		Quinton Lucas	2019	present	Democratic	

== Notes ==
- A. 45 people have served as mayor, three twice, and the table includes these non-consecutive terms.
- B. The fractional terms of some mayors are not absolutely literal, but show single terms during which multiple mayors served, for reasons like resignations or deaths.
- C. Johnson resigned after only 35 days in office.
- D. Per the new city charter, Holmes was the first mayor to serve a two-year term.
- E. Died in office.
- F. Smith resigned from office.
- G. Kemp served one two-year term, one three-year term, and one four-year term.

== See also ==
- List of mayors of Kansas City, Kansas
- Timeline of Kansas City, Missouri
