= Leander Talbott =

Leander Talbott is the name of:

- Leander J. Talbott (1849–1924), Mayor of Kansas City, Missouri
- Lee Talbott (Leander James Talbott, Jr.; 1887–1954), American track and field athlete, tug of war competitor, and wrestler
