= Coates House Hotel =

- U.S. National Register of Historic Places
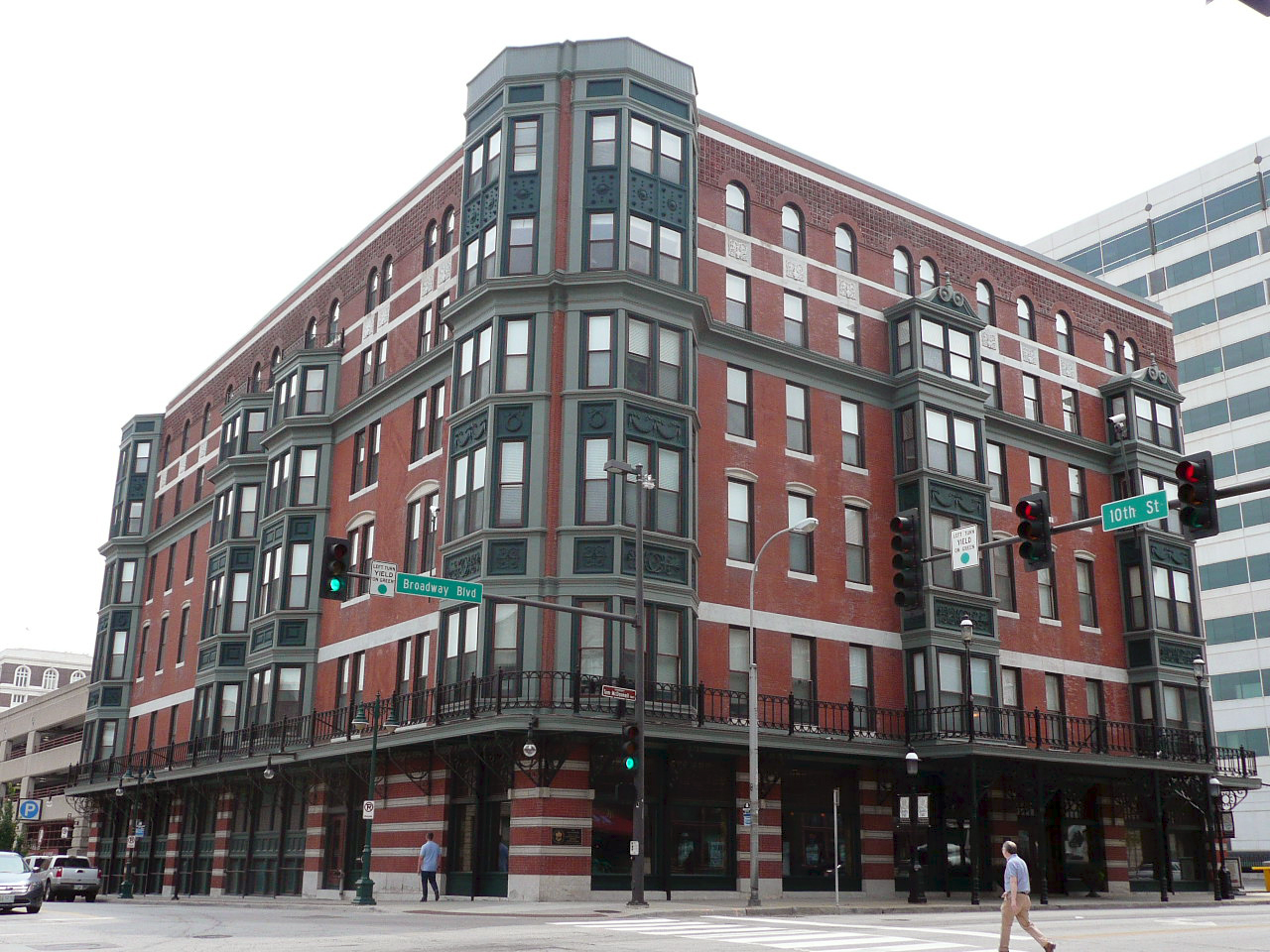
- Coates House Hotel in 2015
- Coordinates: 39°06′08″N 94°35′17″W
- Built: 1886–1891
- Built by: C. E. Clark
- Architect: Van Brunt & Howe
- Restored: 1984–1987
- Restored by: McCormack Baron Salazar
- NRHP reference No.: 72000715

Significant dates
- Added to NRHP: February 23, 1972
- Designated: Building

The Coates House Hotel is a former hotel at 1005 Broadway in downtown Kansas City, Missouri, on the National Register of Historic Places. Also known as the New Coates House Hotel, it was built in 1889–1891, incorporating parts of an earlier hotel, which had been built in the late 1860s as the Broadway Hotel and then became the Coates House after a change in ownership. In 1978, when it had become primarily single-room occupancy for transients, it burned in the deadliest fire in the city's history. It was subsequently restored and is now an apartment building.

== First hotel ==
The first hotel on the site, at 10th Street and Broadway, was designed in 1857 by John Johnson, an English architect who later became the third mayor of Kansas City, as part of the development of former farmland owned by Kersey Coates that later became the neighborhood of Quality Hill; at the time it was ten blocks south of downtown. The building was unfinished when the Civil War broke out; Union forces used the foundations for a cavalry barracks, part of Camp Union.

Originally called the Broadway Hotel, it was owned and built in the late 1860s by anti-slavery Colonel Shalor Winchell Eldridge (1816–1899) from Massachusetts, who was elected a Commissioner of Lawrence, Kansas, appointed Quartermaster of the State of Kansas, and appointed U.S. Army Paymaster by President Lincoln; it was then managed by his brother Thomas Bailey Eldridge (1825-1897). Colonel Eldridge was already well known for his other hotel, the Eldridge House, which he rebuilt three times in defiance of a local pro-slavery judge and sheriff who fired on his hotel with a canon and then set it ablaze. Broadway Hotel was a five-story brick building with a mansard roof. It did not prosper, and in 1870 Coates acquired it and it was renamed the Coates House. In the 1860s, Coates had built an opera house diagonally across 10th Street; it and the hotel catalyzed the development of a wealthy neighborhood. Beginning in 1886, Coates added a new wing at the south end; President Grover Cleveland and his wife Frances stayed there in October 1887.

== Second hotel ==
Coates had died in April 1887. Beginning in 1888, his widow and family demolished the original hotel and rebuilt it on the same site as the New Coates House Hotel, while enlarging Coates' addition. President Benjamin Harrison stayed in the addition in 1890, before rebuilding was complete. The new hotel opened on January 10, 1891. This building, the northern section of which survives, was designed by Van Brunt & Howe; it has six stories and is of brick with stone ornamentation and stone courses on the upper floors, and white-painted stone with brick courses on the first floor. A balcony extends across each of the two main facades, on Broadway and 10th Street. The building originally had a crenellated parapet inscribed with "Coates House" on both main facades, and turrets or belvederes at the corners; these have been removed, as have the chimneys. It originally formed a rectangle around a central courtyard; the four-story east side, which housed services such as laundry and storage and rooms for employees, was later mostly demolished, leaving a U-shaped building.

The new hotel had a marble main staircase and offered services including a barber shop, a florist's, a bonnet shop, and Victorian Turkish baths. It remained a prestigious hotel for several decades; guests after the reopening included Presidents William McKinley and Theodore Roosevelt, Edwin Booth, William Jennings Bryan, and Oscar Wilde. It was nicknamed "the hotel of the presidents".

== Fire and rebuilding ==
On January 28, 1978, by which time it was in disrepair and primarily occupied by transients and the elderly at $12–17 a week, the hotel was burned out in a fire that started at about 4 am in a room in the south wing. There were approximately 140 residents; more than 100 people were left homeless, and 20 were killed, mostly by jumping from upper floors to escape the fire. As of 2014 it remains the deadliest fire in Kansas City.

Historic Kansas City Foundation bought the ruined building in July 1979. In 1984, McCormack Baron Salazar, a developer based in St Louis, bought it and restored it as middle- and high-income housing; the company has also redeveloped many other sites in Quality Hill. The exterior renovation was completed in 1987, and in 2009 the plaque commemorating Kersey Coates was returned to the building.

There are reports that the building is haunted.
