= John W. Moore (Missouri politician) =

American politician (1840–1917)

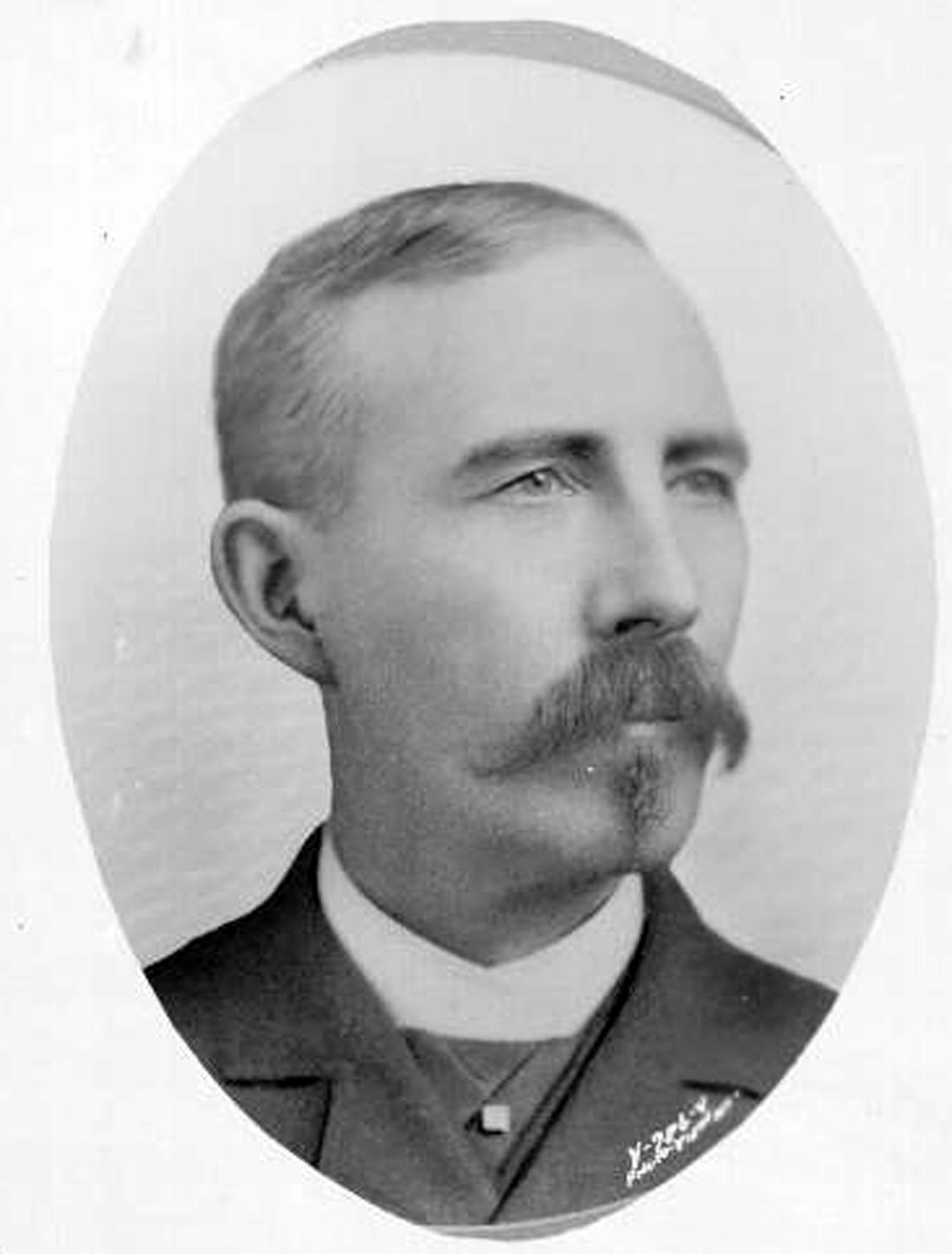

25th Mayor of Kansas City
- In office 1885–1886
- Preceded by: Leander J. Talbott
- Succeeded by: Henry C. Kumpf

Personal details
- Born: 1840 Kentucky, U.S.
- Died: 1917 (aged 76–77)
- Party: Democratic

John W. Moore (1840 – 1917) was Mayor of Kansas City, Missouri in 1885 and a president of the Kansas City Board of Trade.

== Biography ==
Moore was born in Kentucky and was raised near Blue Springs, Missouri.

After the American Civil War he had a freight business on the Santa Fe Trail and established an Eagle flour mill at 19th and Walnut. He had residences at 1622 McGee Street and later 2508 East 31st Street.

Political offices
Preceded by Leander J. Talbott	Mayor of Kansas City, Missouri; 1885–1886	Succeeded by Henry C. Kumpf
