= Sarah Coates =

Sarah Coates may refer to:

- Sarah Chandler Coates (1829–1897), American abolitionist and suffragette
- Sarah Agnes Wintemute Coates (1864–1945), Canadian educator, nutritional researcher, and writer
