= Senator Wofford =

Senator Wofford may refer to:

== Members of the United States Senate ==
- Harris Wofford (1926–2019), U.S. Senator from Pennsylvania from 1991 to 1995
- Thomas A. Wofford (1908–1978), U.S. Senator from South Carolina in 1956

== United States state senate members ==
- John W. Wofford (politician) (1837–1907), Georgia State Senate
