= George H. Edwards =

Mayor of Kansas City (1916–1918)

38th Mayor of Kansas City
- In office 1916–1918
- Preceded by: Henry L. Jost
- Succeeded by: James Cowgill

Personal details
- Born: George H. Edwards; May 25, 1860 St. Louis, Missouri, United States
- Died: December 28, 1941 (aged 81)
- Party: Republican

George H. Edwards (May 25, 1860 - December 28, 1941) was Mayor of Kansas City, Missouri, from 1916 to 1918.

== Biography ==
Edwards was born on May 25, 1860, in St. Louis, Missouri and moved to Kansas City in 1888, first living at 609 Brooklyn Avenue and then 3533 Harrison Boulevard while mayor.

He was the secretary and manager of Edwards & Sloane Jewelry.

Political offices
Preceded by Henry L. Jost	Mayor of Kansas City, Missouri; 1916–1918	Succeeded by James Cowgill
