= Elijah M. McGee =

American mayor and developer (1819–1873)

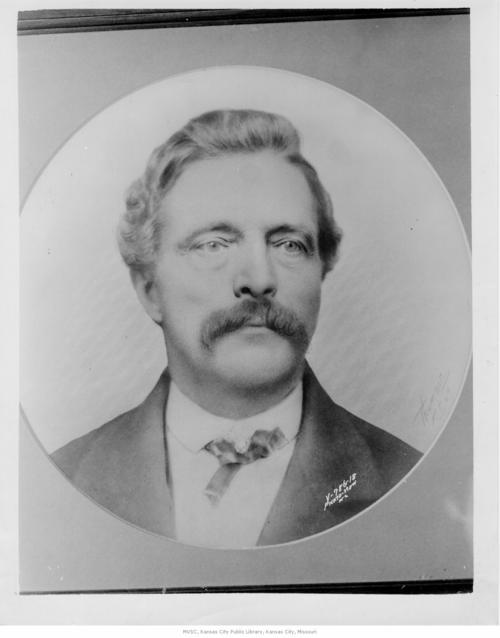
- McGee in 1870

12th Mayor of Kansas City
- In office 1870–1871
- Preceded by: Francis R. Long
- Succeeded by: William Warner

Personal details
- Born: Elijah Milton McGee; May 10, 1819 Shelby County, Kentucky, U.S.
- Died: February 11, 1873 (aged 53)
- Party: Democratic

Elijah Milton McGee (May 10, 1819 – February 11, 1873) was a Democratic Kansas City Mayor in 1870 and a developer whose family name is applied to many streets in Kansas City.

== Biography ==
McGee was born in Shelby County, Kentucky, on May 10, 1819. His family moved to Kansas City, Clay County, Missouri, and then to Jackson County, Missouri, where they bought a half section of land of what is now Downtown Kansas City. When McGee was 12, he ran away from home to Texas. He returned to Kansas City in 1841. He made a fortune in the California Gold Rush and used the money to build the Southern House hotel at 16th and Grand. The hotel would become a hotbed of southern sympathizers in the Bleeding Kansas war. In 1854, he helped start the Kansas City Journal-Post. McGee became mayor of Kansas city from 1870 to 1871, and died on February 11, 1873.

Political offices
Preceded by Francis R. Long	Mayor of Kansas City, Missouri; 1870–1871	Succeeded by William Warner
