= Thomas T. Crittenden Jr. =

American mayor (1863–1938)

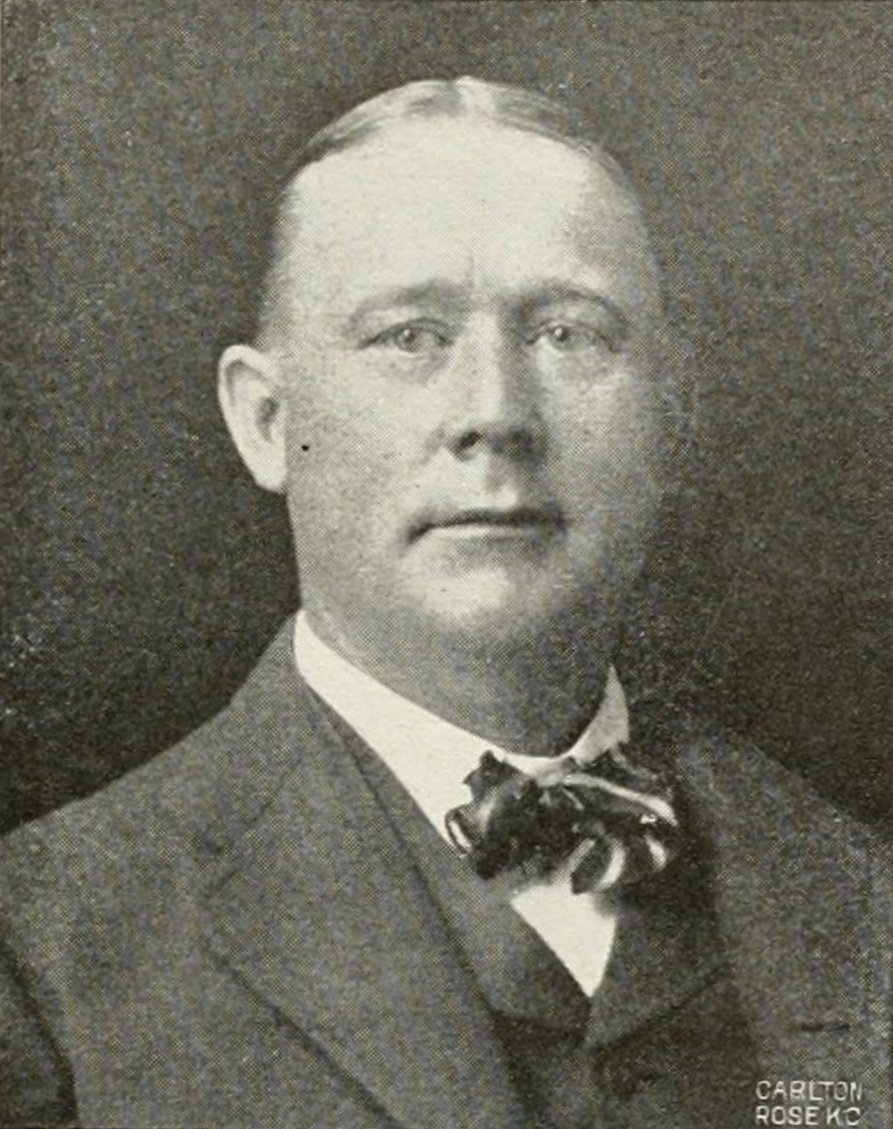
- Portrait of Crittenden (c. 1902)

35th Mayor of Kansas City
- In office 1907–1910
- Preceded by: Henry M. Beardsley
- Succeeded by: Darius A. Brown

Personal details
- Born: December 23, 1863 Springfield, Illinois, U.S.
- Died: July 31, 1938 (aged 74) Kansas City, Missouri, U.S.
- Resting place: Forest Hill Calvary Cemetery; Kansas City, Missouri, U.S.
- Party: Democratic
- Spouse: Jennie Mason Rogers (m. 1888)
- Relations: John Crittenden Sr. (great-grandfather); John Jordan Crittenden (grand-uncle); Robert Crittenden (grand-uncle)
- Children: 3
- Parent: Thomas Theodore Crittenden (father)
- Education: University of Missouri

Thomas Theodore Crittenden Jr. (December 23, 1863 – July 31, 1938) was the Mayor of Kansas City, Missouri from 1907 to 1910.

== Early life ==
Thomas Theodore Crittenden Jr. was born on December 23, 1863, near Springfield, Illinois. His father was Missouri Governor Thomas Theodore Crittenden. He was the great-grandson of John Crittenden Sr.; grandnephew of John Jordan Crittenden and Robert Crittenden. He was raised in Warrensburg, Missouri and graduated from the public schools in Warrensburg. He graduated from University of Missouri in Columbia in 1883 and moved to Kansas City, Missouri in 1884.

== Career ==
After moving to Kansas City, Crittenden got into the real estate business. He was appointed deputy clerk of the Court of Appeals. In 1894, Crittenden was elected as a Democrat as clerk of the Court of Appeals

Crittenden served as Mayor of Kansas City from 1907 to 1910.

== Personal life ==
Crittenden married Jennie Mason Rogers on January 5, 1888. They had a daughter and two sons, including Joseph R. and Mason A.

Crittenden died on July 31, 1938, in Kansas City. Crittenden was buried at Forest Hill Calvary Cemetery in Kansas City.

Political offices
Preceded by Henry M. Beardsley	Mayor of Kansas City, Missouri; 1907–1910	Succeeded by Darius A. Brown
