= Henry L. Jost =

American lawyer and politician (1873–1950)

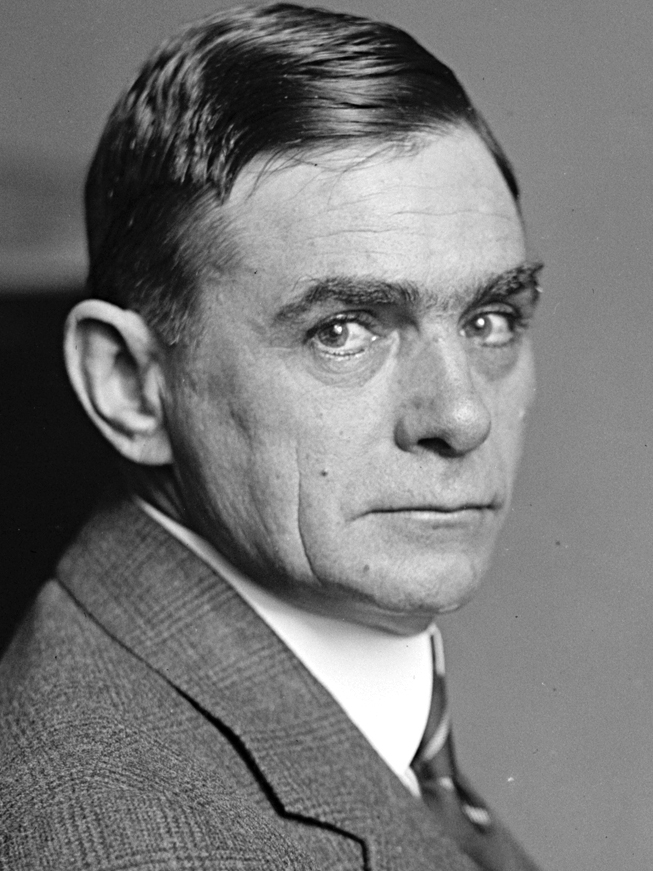
- Jost in 1923

Member of the U.S. House of Representatives from Missouri's 5th district
- In office March 4, 1923 – March 3, 1925
- Preceded by: Edgar C. Ellis
- Succeeded by: Edgar C. Ellis

37th Mayor of Kansas City
- In office 1912–1916
- Preceded by: Darius A. Brown
- Succeeded by: George H. Edwards

Personal details
- Born: Henry Lee Jost; December 6, 1873 New York City, US
- Died: July 13, 1950 (aged 76) Kansas City, Missouri, US
- Party: Democratic
- Occupation: Lawyer, politician

Henry Lee Jost (December 6, 1873 – July 13, 1950) was an American lawyer and politician.

Orphaned as a child, Jost moved to Missouri as part of the Orphan Train, where he went on to practice law and engage in politics. A Democrat, he served as mayor of Kansas City, Missouri, and was also a member of the United States House of Representatives from Missouri. He was part of the Joe Shannon and Tom Pendergast political machines.

== Early life and education ==
Henry Lee Jost was born on December 6, 1873, in New York City, Simeon Jost and Lena (née Bahr) Jost. As a child, he lived in an orphanage in Five Points, Manhattan, as his mother had died and his father was ill. In 1881, he moved to Nodaway County, Missouri as part of the Orphan Train after his parents missed a payment to keep him in the orphanage. In Missouri, he lived with Judge Dale and then with the Lasswell family. Beginning at age 15, he worked as a farmhand near Maryville.

At age 22, Jost moved to Hopkins. He studied law at the Kansas City School of Law, graduating in 1898 and being admitted to the bar in the same year.

== Career ==
Jost began practicing law in Kansas City, Missouri, in 1899, with his first partnership being with one Frank Hagerman. He mentored Roger C. Slaughter while Slaughter read law. In 1909, he became associate city counselor in 1909, and from 1910 to 1912, he served as Kansas City's first assistant prosecuting attorney. He taught criminology at Kansas City School of Law from 1917.

A Democrat, Jost served as mayor of Kansas City from 1912 to 1916. He was popular among voters due to his upbringing, with him being nicknamed the "Orphan Boy Mayor". He won his first election by approximately 3,500 votes, and his second election by between 6,000 and 7,000 votes.

During his tenure, the Kansas City Union Station and the Federal Reserve Bank of Kansas City were established; the latter came with a $4,250,000 bond for the city. He served two terms and lost his re-election. He increased the efficiency of the Kansas City government. Jost worked with political boss Joe Shannon, though supported the rival Tom Pendergast later in his career; Pendergast ended his endorsement of Jost, which caused him to lose his re-election to George H. Edwards. He and Bryce B. Smith were the only Kansas City mayors to run for a third term, though Jost did not win the re-election.

From March 4, 1923, to March 3, 1925, Jost represented the Missouri's 5th congressional district in the United States House of Representatives. During his tenure, he introduced legislation to establish a park to commemorate the Battle of Westport. He declined running for re-election, with him criticizing what he called "socialistic legislation" passed by Congress, such as the bonus payment to veterans of World War I.

== Personal life and death ==
After serving political office, Jost returned to practicing law. He retired to Belton. On August 9, 1911, he married Mary Alice Hanks, with whom he had two children: Mary and Henry Jr. He was Episcopalian and a member of the Freemasons and the Ancient Order of United Workmen. He died on July 13, 1950, aged 76, at Saint Luke's Hospital of Kansas City, from an intestinal condition.

He is buried in Mount Moriah Cemetery, in Kansas City. A special collection covering Jost is held by the State Historical Society of Missouri.

Political offices
Preceded by Darius A. Brown	Mayor of Kansas City, Missouri; 1912–1916	Succeeded by George H. Edwards
U.S. House of Representatives
Preceded by Edgar C. Ellis	United States Representative for the 5th congressional district of Missouri; 1923–1925	Succeeded by Edgar C. Ellis
