= Henry C. Kumpf =

American politician (1830–1904)

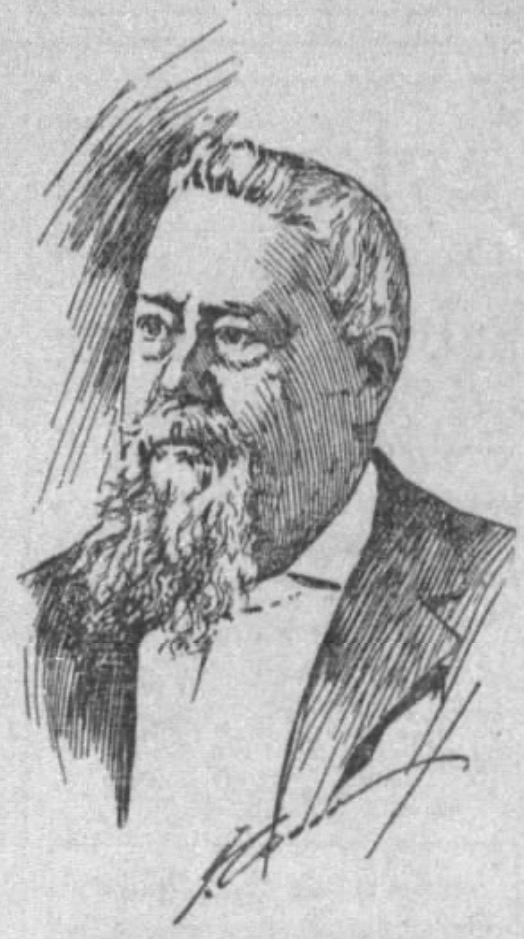

26th Mayor of Kansas City
- In office 1886–1889
- Preceded by: John W. Moore
- Succeeded by: Joseph J. Davenport

Personal details
- Born: July 12, 1830 Beerfelden, Grand Duchy of Hesse
- Died: April 13, 1904 (aged 73)
- Resting place: Elmwood Cemetery
- Party: Republican

Henry Christian Kumpf (July 12, 1830 – April 13, 1904) was an American politician. A Republican, he served as mayor of Kansas City, Missouri from 1886 to 1889.

== Biography ==
He was born in Beerfelden, Grand Duchy of Hesse.

He moved to St. Louis, Missouri in 1850 where he studied English as a grocery clerk and worked as a shipping clerk at the St. Louis Arsenal from 1861 to 1865. After the American Civil War, he moved to Kansas City where he opened a billiard hall. He was city auditor from 1872 to 1876, and city comptroller from 1877 to 1879.

His residences included 2nd and High Streets, 1222 Delaware (Baltimore), and he died while living with his son George, at 1109 Forest.

He is buried in Elmwood Cemetery. A public elementary school at 44th and Wabash, near Brooklyn Park, was named after him. It has since been torn down.

Political offices
Preceded by John W. Moore	Mayor of Kansas City, Missouri; 1886–1889	Succeeded by Joseph J. Davenport
