= Milton J. Payne =

4th mayor of Kansas City, Missouri and a founder of the Kansas City Enterprise newspaper

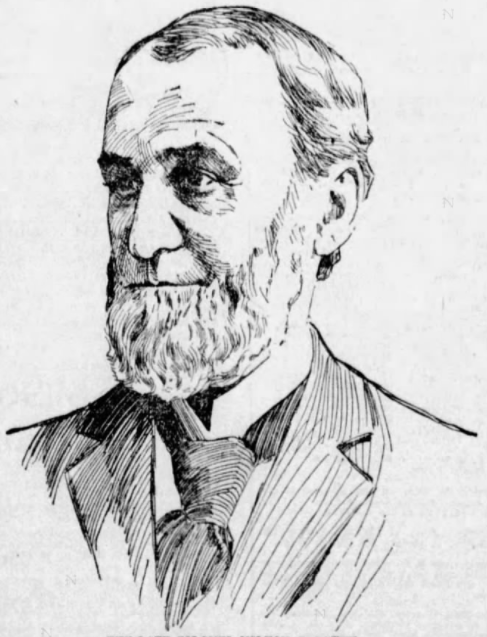

4th Mayor of Kansas City
- In office 1862–1863
- Preceded by: Robert T. Van Horn
- Succeeded by: William Bonnifield
- In office 1855–1860
- Preceded by: John Johnson
- Succeeded by: George M.B. Maughs

Personal details
- Born: Milton Jameson Payne; October 29, 1829; Christian County, Kentucky, U.S.
- Died: July 17, 1900 (aged 70); Kansas City, Missouri, U.S.
- Political party: Democratic
- Spouses: Adeline Mary Prudhomme (m. 1852; died 1867) Jeannie Chamberlin (m. 1892)
- Children: 6
- Occupation: Editor, politician

Milton Jameson Payne (October 29, 1829 – July 17, 1900) was one of the founders of the Kansas City Enterprise and served as the Mayor of Kansas City, Missouri for six one-year terms. He was also the city's youngest mayor, first elected in 1855, at the age of 26.

== Biography ==
Payne was born on a farm in Christian County, Kentucky and was self-educated. In 1849, he moved to St. Louis, Missouri, where he worked and saved enough money to head west in the California Gold Rush. En route he decided to stay in Kansas City, where, in 1852, he married Adeline Mary Prudhomme, the posthumous daughter of Gabriel Prudhomme, who had once owned all of the original Kansas City town site. He worked at Walker, Boyd & Chick, the biggest merchant in the old.

He was among the founders of Kansas City's first newspaper, the Enterprise.

Payne, who always carried a gun while walking the streets, was elected mayor five times between 1855 and 1859 and was elected to a sixth term during the American Civil War in 1862.

Payne pushed for sewers, and helped build a road system up to 29th Street. His real estate developments included the area where the Liberty Memorial is now located.

Payne's wife Adeline died in 1867. He remarried to Jeannie Chamberlin in 1892.

Milton J. Payne died at his home in Kansas City on July 17, 1900. Despite his contributions, he was originally buried in an unmarked grave in Union Cemetery; a monument was added later.

Preceded by John Johnson	Mayor of Kansas City, Missouri; 1855–1860	Succeeded by George M.B. Maughs
Preceded by Robert T. Van Horn	Mayor of Kansas City, Missouri; 1862–1863	Succeeded by William Bonnifield
