= Charles A. Chace =

American politician (1822–1900)

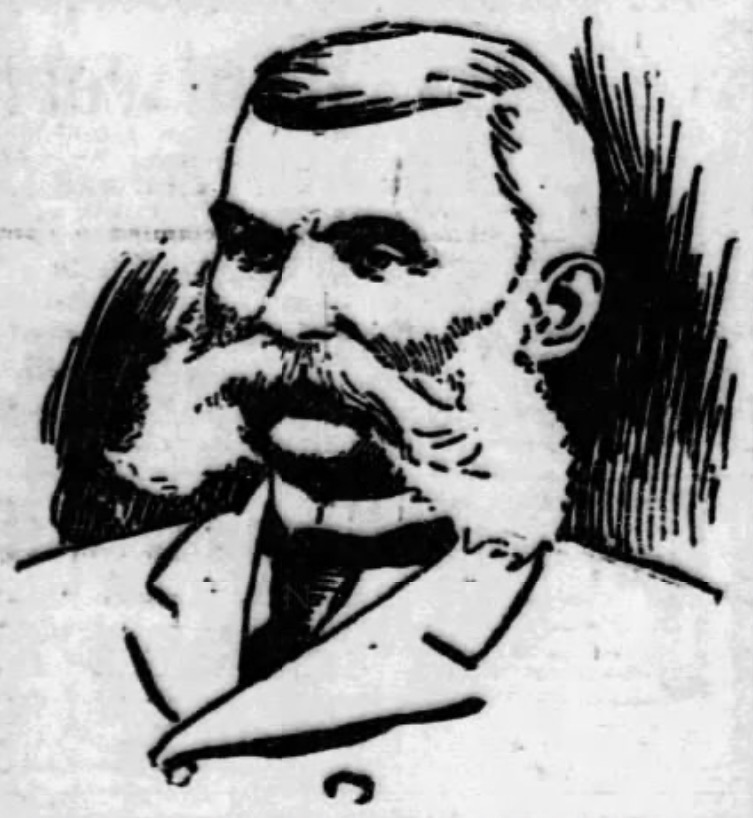

20th Mayor of Kansas City, Missouri
- In office 1880–1881
- Preceded by: George M. Shelley
- Succeeded by: Daniel A. Frink

Personal details
- Born: 1822 Columbia County, New York, U.S.
- Died: July 17, 1900 (aged 77–78) Brighton, Monroe County, New York, U.S.
- Party: Democratic

Charles A. Chace (1822 – July 17, 1900) was a politician from Missouri. He served as Mayor of Kansas City in 1880.

== Early life ==
Charles A. Chace was born in 1822 in Columbia County, New York.

== Career ==
In 1860, Chace moved to Kansas City, Missouri. Chace worked as a freight agent for the Chicago, Burlington and Quincy Railroad. He had a grain and feed business in Kansas City. He served on the school board for eleven years. In April 1880, Chace was elected on a Democratic ticket as Mayor of Kansas City. He served for one year. Chace retired from public life and moved to Holley, New York. He then moved to Brighton in Monroe County, New York, in 1898.

== Personal life ==
Chace was a charter member of the Knights Templar in Kansas City. While in Kansas City, Chace lived at 1216 W. 12th Street.

Chace was married. Chace died at his home in Brighton on July 17, 1900.

== Legacy ==
The Chace School in Kansas City, built in 1876, was named after Chace. The school was razed in 1913.

Political offices
Preceded by George M. Shelley	Mayor of Kansas City, Missouri; 1880–1881	Succeeded by Daniel A. Frink
