= Robert T. Van Horn =

American politician (1824–1916)

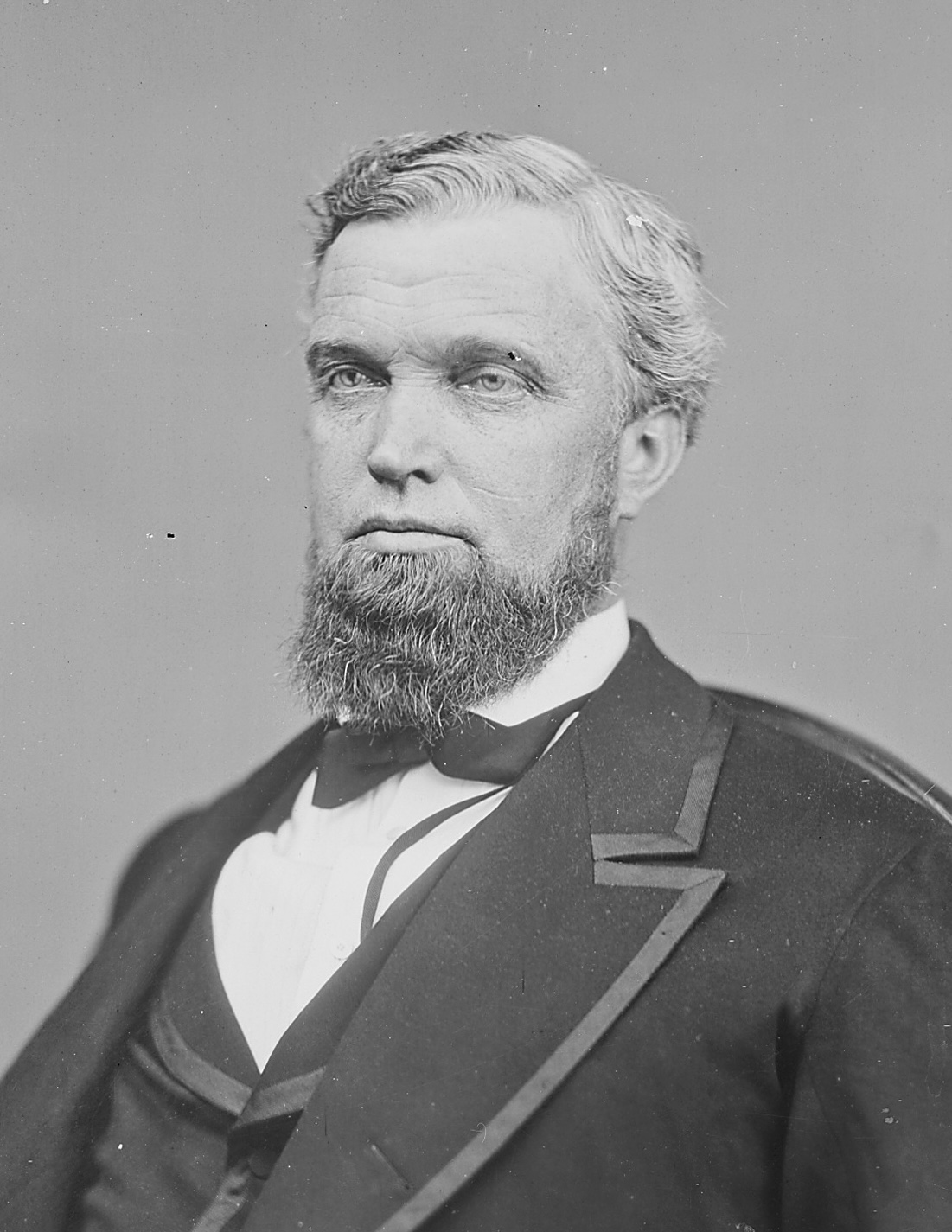
- Van Horn, c. 1860-65

Member of the U.S. House of Representatives from Missouri
- In office February 27, 1896 – March 3, 1897
- Preceded by: John Charles Tarsney
- Succeeded by: William S. Cowherd
- Constituency: 5th district
- In office March 4, 1881 – March 3, 1883
- Preceded by: Samuel Locke Sawyer
- Succeeded by: John Joseph O’Neill
- Constituency: 8th district
- In office March 4, 1865 – March 3, 1871
- Preceded by: Austin Augustus King
- Succeeded by: Abram Comingo
- Constituency: 6th district

6th Mayor of Kansas City
- In office 1863–1865
- Preceded by: William Bonnifield
- Succeeded by: Patrick Shannon
- In office 1861–1862
- Preceded by: George M.B. Maughs
- Succeeded by: Milton J. Payne

Member of the Missouri State Senate
- In office 1862–1863

Personal details
- Born: Robert Thompson Van Horn; May 19, 1824 East Mahoning Township, Pennsylvania, U.S.
- Died: January 3, 1916 (aged 91) Kansas City, Missouri, U.S.
- Party: Republican

Military service
- Allegiance: United States
- Rank: Lieutenant Colonel
- Unit: Twenty-fifth Regiment, Missouri Volunteer Infantry
- Battles/wars: American Civil War

Robert Thompson Van Horn (May 19, 1824 – January 3, 1916) was an American lawyer, the owner and publisher of The Kansas City Enterprise, the 6th mayor of Kansas City, Missouri during parts of the Civil War, a member of the Missouri General Assembly, and a representative of Missouri's 5th, 6th, and 8th congressional districts.

== Early years ==
Van Horn was born on May 19, 1824, in East Mahoning Township, Pennsylvania, to Henry and Elizabeth (Thompson) Van Horn. He attended a common school and apprenticed to a printer. In 1844, he moved to Pomeroy, Ohio, where he studied law. He was admitted to the bar in about 1850 and began his practice in town.

== Kansas City and Civil War ==
Van Horn moved to Kansas City in 1855. In 1856, Van Horn purchased the newspaper The Enterprise and renamed it The Kansas City Journal, which published daily from 1858 until its closing in 1942.

In 1857, he became member of the city's board of the aldermen. He became the postmaster of Kansas City the same year and held the position until 1861.

In 1861, Van Horn was elected to his first one year term as the 6th Mayor of Kansas City, the first Republican to hold the title. He would then be re-elected in 1863 and again in 1864.

During the American Civil War, Van Horn enlisted in the Union Army and served as a lieutenant colonel of the Twenty-fifth Regiment, Missouri Volunteer Infantry.

== Political career ==
In 1862, Van Horn was elected as a member of the Missouri State Senate, a title he held until 1864. He represented Missouri's 6th congressional district in the Thirty-ninth, Fortieth, and Forty-first Congresses from 1865 to 1871. He was not a candidate for renomination in 1870.

Van Horn served as the chairman of the Republican State central committee from 1874 to 1876. From 1875 to 1881, he was the collector of internal revenue for the sixth district of Missouri. In 1882, Van Horn was one of the original incorporators of the Kansas City Club.

Van Horn was a delegate to the Republican National Conventions in 1864, 1868, 1872, 1876, 1880, and 1884. He was also a member of the Republican National Committee in 1872 and 1884.

Van Horn was elected to represent Missouri's 8th congressional district in the Forty-seventh Congress from 1881 to 1883. He then successfully contested the election of John C. Tarsney for representative of Missouri's 5th congressional district in the Fifty-fourth Congress and served from 1896 to 1897. He sought re-election in 1896, but he was an unsuccessful candidate for renomination.

== Later years and death ==
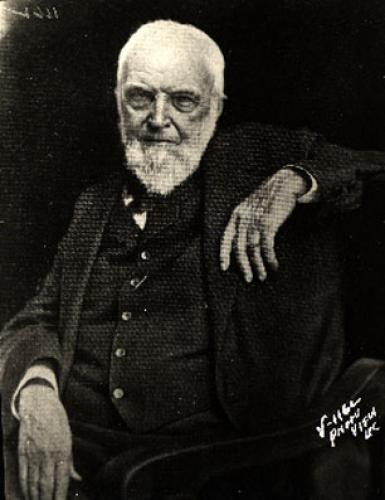

Van Horn retired from editorship of The Kansas City Journal in 1897. He died on his estate, "Honeywood", at Evanston Station, in Independence, Missouri on January 3, 1916, and was interred in Mount Washington Cemetery, Kansas City, Missouri.

Van Horn High School was built on the site of Honeywood, in 1955. Truman Road was originally called Van Horn Road in his honor.

Political offices
Preceded by George M.B. Maughs	Mayor of Kansas City, Missouri; 1861–1862	Succeeded by Milton J. Payne
Preceded by William Bonnifield	Mayor of Kansas City, Missouri; 1863–1864	Succeeded by Patrick Shannon
U.S. House of Representatives
Preceded by Austin Augustus King	Member of the U.S. House of Representatives from Missouri's 6th congressional district 1865–1871	Succeeded by Abram Comingo
Preceded by Samuel Locke Sawyer	Member of the U.S. House of Representatives from Missouri's 8th congressional district 1881–1883	Succeeded by John Joseph O'Neill
Preceded by John Charles Tarsney	Member of the U.S. House of Representatives from Missouri's 5th congressional district 1896–1897	Succeeded by William S. Cowherd
