= Daniel A. Frink =

American politician (1835–1885)

21st Mayor of Kansas City
- In office 1881–1882
- Preceded by: Charles A. Chace
- Succeeded by: Thomas B. Bullene

Personal details
- Born: January 18, 1835; Ellington, Connecticut, U.S.
- Died: November 11, 1885 (aged 50); Kansas City, Missouri, U.S.
- Resting place: Union Cemetery; Kansas City, Missouri, U.S.
- Political party: Republican
- Spouse: Helen E. Mills (m. 1856)
- Children: 3
- Occupation: Politician; realtor; actor

Daniel A. Frink (January 18, 1835 – November 11, 1885) was a politician from Missouri. He served as Mayor of Kansas City in 1881.

== Early life ==
Daniel A. Frink was born in January 18, 1835 in Ellington, Connecticut, to Rachel and Elisha Frink. His father was a reverend. At a young age, his family moved to Michigan. For a few years, Frink worked as an actor.

== Career ==
In 1855, Frink moved to Kalamazoo, Michigan. He worked in county positions there. During the Civil War, Frink was appointed deputy provost marshal and was in charge of recruitment for the western portion of Michigan. In the fall of 1867, Frink moved to Kansas City, Missouri. He invested in real estate and worked as a realtor in Kansas City. In the fall of 1878, Frink was elected as county judge. In 1881, Frink succeeded Charles A. Chace as Mayor of Kansas City. He was a Republican. During his administration, ordinances were created to prohibit prostitution and gambling in the city. Frink had disputes with William R. Nelson, editor of The Kansas City Evening Star about whether the city charter allowed for the funding of parks and recreation in Kansas City.

== Personal life ==
Frink married Helen E. Mills in 1856. He had three children, Fleta, Nellie and Lena.

Frink died of a lung abscess and pneumonia on November 11, 1885, at his home at 320 West 6th Street in Kansas City. He was buried at Union Cemetery in Kansas City.

Political offices
Preceded by Charles A. Chace	Mayor of Kansas City, Missouri; 1881–1882	Succeeded by Thomas B. Bullene
