= Frank H. Cromwell =

Mayor of Kansas City (1922-1924)

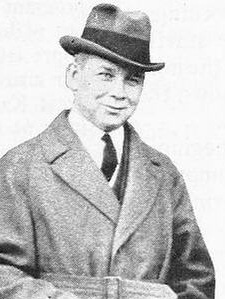
- Cromwell in 1923

41st Mayor of Kansas City
- In office 1922–1924
- Preceded by: Sam B. Strother
- Succeeded by: Albert I. Beach

Personal details
- Born: Frank Houghton Cromwell; April 22, 1878; Kansas City, Missouri, U.S.
- Died: April 14, 1955 (aged 76)
- Political party: Democratic
- Spouses: Clara E. Stark (m. 1903; died 1944) Viola Douglass (m. 1944; died 1951)
- Children: 1

Frank Houghton Cromwell (April 22, 1878 – April 14, 1955) was Mayor of Kansas City, Missouri from 1922 to 1924.

== Early life ==
Cromwell was born April 22, 1878, on a farm at 39th and Harrison in Kansas City, Missouri, to Eliza (née Hilton) and Benjamin H. Cromwell. At the age of 14, his father died. Cromwell attended two years of school at Central High School. He later took a course at Central Business College.

== Career ==
Cromwell delivered papers and worked other jobs. He was surveyor for "Tuttle & Pike, civil engineers" for two years. One of those years, he did surveying in Grandin, Missouri. Cromwell then became a salesman for the W. L. Grush Commission Company, owned by Walter L. Grush, in 1898 and later changed the name to the Cromwell Butter & Egg Company. He became a stockholder and vice president of the company after Grush's death in 1916. The business would eventually fail in 1938 after the Crash of 1929. Cromwell also worked as director of the Empire Ice and Storage Company and president and general manager of the Federal Building and Loan Company.

He was elected mayor of Kansas City in 1922 and served one two-year term. He ran again in 1924, but was defeated by Albert I. Beach. In 1948, Cromwell ran as an Independent write-in candidate.

In 1930, Cromwell was appointed a Democratic member of the park board. In 1936, he was made president of the park board, succeeding Judge Joseph A. Guthrie. He served as president for two years. In 1938, Cromwell was appointed supervisor of creation for the park department.

He became a liquor salesman during World War II. In the 1950s, Cromwell was a deputy sheriff, working as bailiff in division 4 of the Jackson County Circuit Court under Judges Thomas R. Hunt and Duvaul P. Strother.

== Personal life ==
Cromwell married Clara E. Stark in 1903. His wife died in 1944. Cromwell married Mrs. Viola Douglass in 1944. She died in 1951. He had one son, Frank H. Cromwell Jr., who died of leukemia. Later in life, Cromwell lived at the Westport Arms apartments in Kansas City.

Cromwell died on April 14, 1955, at the Trinity Lutheran Hospital in Kansas City. He had suffered a stroke two weeks prior. He was cremated.

Political offices
| Preceded by Sam B. Strother | Mayor of Kansas City, Missouri; 1922–1924 | Succeeded by Albert I. Beach |
