= Darius A. Brown =

American lawyer and politician (1869–1938)

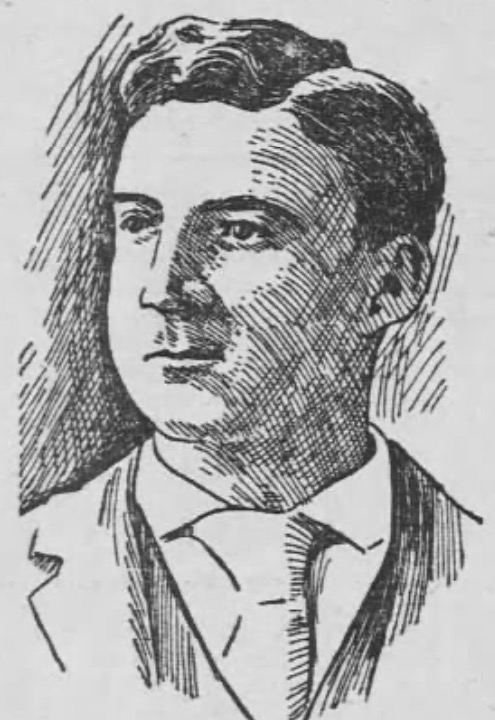

36th Mayor of Kansas City, Missouri
- In office 1910–1912
- Preceded by: Thomas T. Crittenden Jr.
- Succeeded by: Henry L. Jost

Personal details
- Born: Darius Alvin Brown; November 3, 1869 Wabaunsee County, Kansas, US
- Died: November 3, 1938 (aged 69) Kansas City, Missouri, US
- Party: Republican
- Occupation: Lawyer, politician

Darius Alvin Brown (alternatively Darious; November 3, 1869 – November 3, 1938) was an American lawyer and politician. A Republican, he served as the 36th mayor of Kansas City, Missouri from 1910 to 1912.

== Early life and early career ==
Darius Alvin Brown was born on November 3, 1869, in Wabaunsee County, Kansas. At age six, he and his family moved to Topeka to avoid prairie fires caused by drought. Throughout his childhood, he worked as a paperboy and shoeshiner, and during summers, was a drover and transported sand and gravel. He attended public school in Topeka, graduating high school at age 16.

After high school, Brown worked for the Atchison, Topeka and Santa Fe Railway and played the clarinet for an opera house at night. He was an aspiring actor, though shifted to law after meeting Charles Curtis, who was a district attorney at the time. Beginning in 1891, he studied at the University of Michigan Law School, by suggestion of some Topeka lawyers. He subsidized himself by working again as a clarinetist, as well as a stenographer. He graduated in 1893.

== Career in Kansas City ==
Brown moved to Kansas City, Missouri in 1891, with $2.50 to his name. In 1898, he was elected district attorney. He later served as circuit court judge. In 1905, he was appointed court stenographer, which was the last office he held before becoming mayor. In 1908, he was elected alderman from the Fifth Ward, as which he challenged a local streetcar company. This made him popularity among the people of Kansas City, so he entered the Republican primaries for mayor of Kansas City. He won the primaries with the largest number of votes in the city's history, at the time. He won the mayoral election, serving as mayor from 1910 to 1912. In 1911, he was a president of the National League of Cities convention, held in Atlanta.

On November 6, 1928, Brown returned to serving on the Circuit Court (as its only Republican seat), which he held until his death.

Politically, Brown was progressive. In December 1910, he vetoed an ordinance which required women to cover the sharp tip of their hatpins; he was overruled by the alderman's board. He also urged working women to fight for better wages while speaking at a Loyal Order of Moose event, on July 19, 1916.

== Personal life and death ==
On February 9, 1899, Brown married Nellie Prescott Brown (died 1937); they two children together. He was a member of Loyal Order of Moose, which he served as "supreme dictator" of in 1920. He was also a member of the Shriners, and held every one of its offices at his local shrine.

On November 2, 1938, he underwent prostate surgery at the Research Medical Center, and on November 3, he died from pneumothorax; his doctors described his circumstances of death as unusual. He died on his 69th birthday. His term as judge was to expire on July 1, 1941.

Political offices
Preceded by Thomas T. Crittenden Jr.	Mayor of Kansas City, Missouri; 1910–1912	Succeeded by Henry L. Jost
