= Elmwood Cemetery (Kansas City, Missouri) =

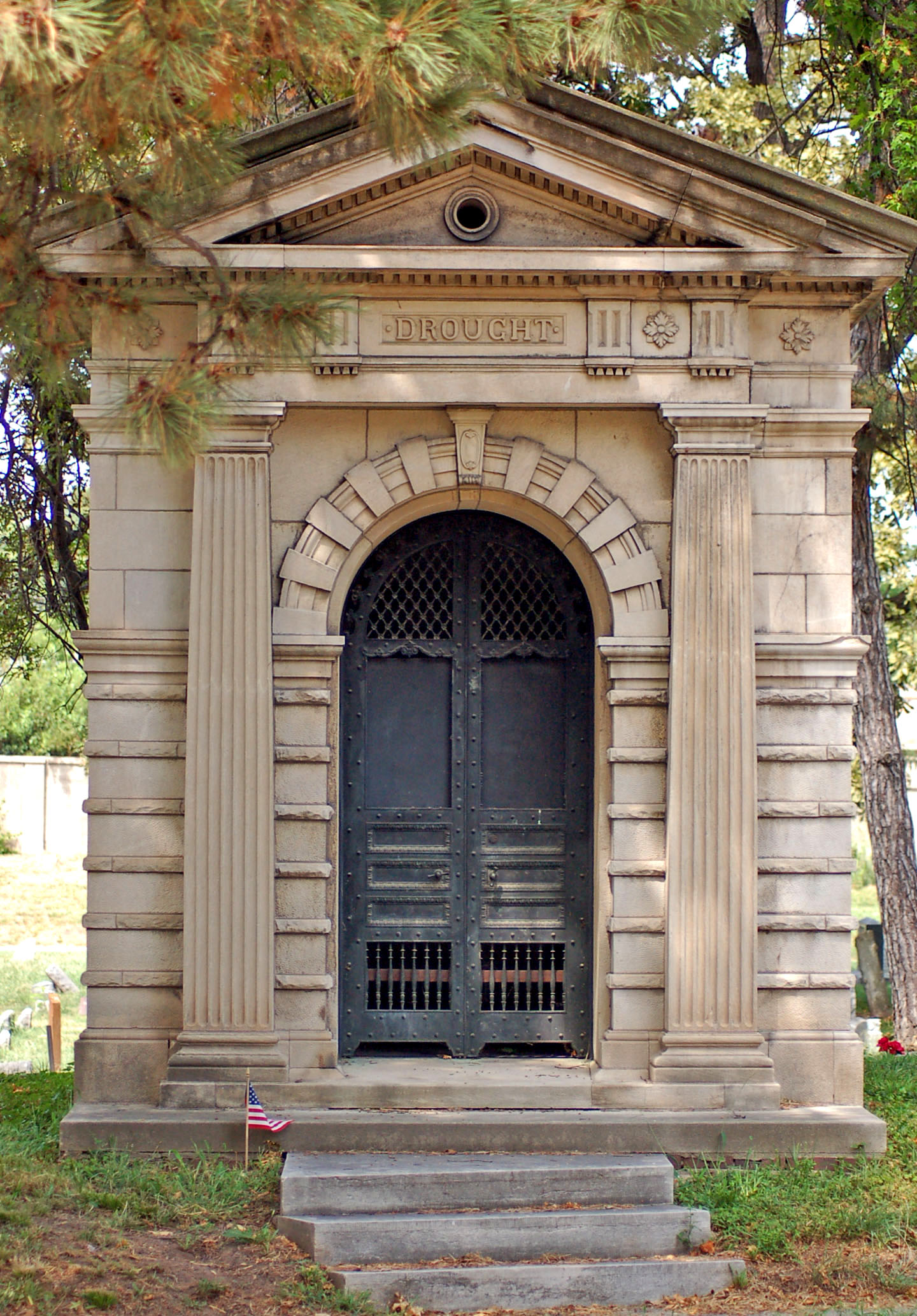
- Above-ground burial vault
- Interactive map of Elmwood Cemetery

Details
- Established: September 8, 1872; 153 years ago
- Location: 4900 Truman Rd., Kansas City, Missouri
- Country: United States
- Coordinates: 39°5′46″N 94°31′33″W
- Type: Rural cemetery
- Owned by: Elmwood Cemetery Society
- Size: 43 acres (17 ha)
- No. of graves: 35,000—38,000
- Find a Grave: Elmwood Cemetery
- Elmwood Cemetery
- U.S. National Register of Historic Places
- Architect: George Kessler
- NRHP reference No.: 83001002
- Added to NRHP: July 28, 1983

Elmwood Cemetery is a 43-acre (17 ha) historic rural cemetery, located in what became the urban area of 4900 Truman Road at the corner of Van Brunt Avenue in Kansas City, Missouri. With an estimated 35,000—38,000 plots, the cemetery is owned, operated, and maintained by the non-profit organization Elmwood Cemetery Society.

== History ==
=== Background ===
Since the 1830s, a new trend crossed the East Coast of the United States of replacing the old English trend of having cemeteries at churches or town squares, in favor of the rural cemetery to enhance sanitation and expandability for vaults, mausoleums, monuments, and naturalistic landscape architecture. This predated the prevalence of city parks in America, and cemeteries were a family destination park for leisure trips.

In 1847, the Town of Kansas (which became Kansas City in the 1850s) platted its first public cemetery near Locust Street and Independence Ave. The cholera pandemic of 1849 had killed half the settlers of the towns of Kansas and Westport and filled their local cemeteries. This prompted the 1857 founding of Union Cemetery, as a shared union in a rural site two miles between the towns.

=== Founding ===
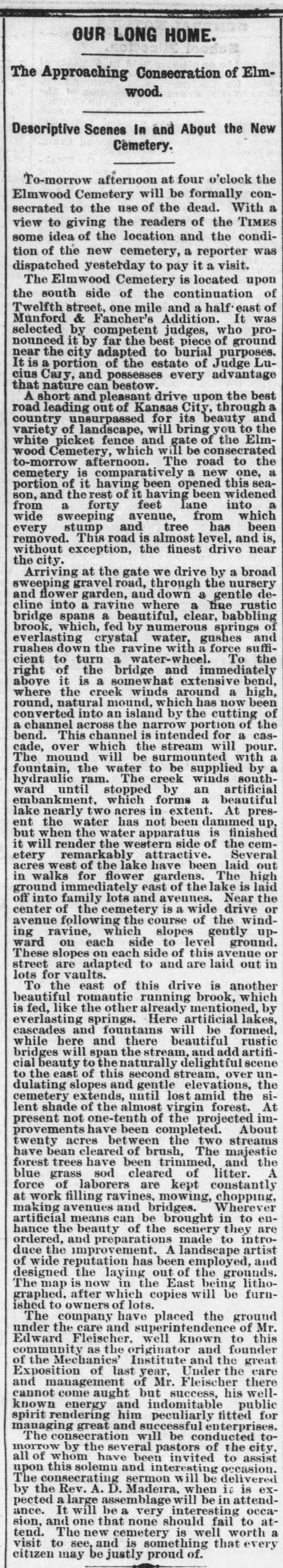
Announcement

By June 1872, an 11 member management team had been formed for Elmwood Cemetery, with Superintendent Edward Fleischer, well known founder of the Mechanics' Institute and the Exposition.

On September 8, 1872, it was ceremoniously opened in the eastern rural area beyond Kansas City, with an elaborately picturesque description in the Kansas City Times the previous day. The article exuberantly invited all Kansas Citians down 12th Street "upon the best road leading out of Kansas City, through a country unsurpassed for its beauty and variety of landscape" to join the party where "numerous springs of everlasting crystal water, gushes and rushes down the ravine with a force sufficient to turn a water-wheel". Only one tenth of the planned significant improvements had been implemented. Soon after, the unsanitary and crowded contents of the original public cemetery were reinterred to Union Cemetery, and the original was graded and converted to a dedicated park.

Elmwood's original features include its namesake elm and other very old native trees, several small spring-fed lakes, and a ravine. Early monuments include artistic representations of angels, lilies, and cypress trees with upstretched branches.

The first burial was infant Sally Ayers on July 5, 1872, who died of "summer complaint", common with food poisoning prior to refrigeration. Elmwood contains the oldest surviving Jewish cemetery in Kansas City, because one of its first sales was 2 acres (0.81 ha) of the southwest corner to Reform Congregation Temple B'nai Jehudah. It received all 37 interments from a crowded cemetery at 18th and Lydia, founded 1866. That area contains the grave of Morris Helzberg, founder of Helzberg Diamonds.

=== Improvements ===
In 1893, August Meyer, the first president of the new Kansas City park board and Elmwood lot owner, hired George Kessler to implement Kessler's master plan of city parks and boulevards for Kansas City.

On June 7, 1896, Meyer and several other entrepreneurs who owned Elmwood lots and were concerned about planning for the inevitable potential future of a cemetery reaching unprofitable capacity and falling to a "mercenery company". They acquired the entire cemetery and incorporated the Elmwood Cemetery Society as a benevolent institution under Missouri law. Unique within Kansas City, this "innovative" financial maintenance plan plus 999-year protective charter into A.D. 2895 defined the sole purpose of owning, maintaining, and perpetuating the cemetery while prohibiting personal and civic encroachments, removal of graves and monuments, and any other purpose of use or transference. It also aligned Elmwood into Kessler's master plan. About US$100,000 (equivalent to $3,583,000 in 2025) worth of municipal upgrades included grading, new trees and shrubs, and a 600-foot (180 m) stone culvert. The several small lakes of the 1872 map are long gone, so a modern treasurer for the Elmwood Cemetery Society suspected Kessler may have removed them.

Over time, the site acquired a vault and crematorium (c. 1897), entrance gate and fence (c. 1900), Kirkland B. Armour Chapel (1904, 1917), and Cemetery Office (1925).

=== Modern ===
In 1983, Elmwood was added to the National Register of Historic Places as an example of the themes of "architecture", "landscape architecture", and "urban design". Its application contains contemporary experts' detailed analyses of its typified and exemplary Victorian era art features and increasingly positive attitudes toward death as an inevitable component of life. They cited art curator Naomi R. Remes describing 19th century rural cemeteries as being "for the deceased to be remembered and beauty beheld, for death was perceived as an exaulted state. Under the sway of 19th-century romanticism, what people could not avoid, they made beautiful."

The Elmwood Cemetery Society promotes the site in its original spirit as a community park and daily destination, such as curation by high school history students, and its paved paths being the training home of the Northeast High School cross country running team. The Society and complementary Friends of Elmwood hold many community events and volunteer activities.

The book Missouri Hauntings reports seeing orbs and shadows, saying, "Walking through Elmwood Cemetery is like walking through an active landmine of spirits."

== Notable burials ==
=== Kansas City mayors ===
- Edward Herrick Allen
- Thomas B. Bullene (1828–1894), mayor and businessman
- James Cowgill
- Webster Davis
- Turner Anderson Gill
- William S. Gregory, first mayor of the Town of Kansas
- Henry C. Kumpf
- Francis R. Long (1812–1881), mayor and banker

=== Others ===
- Mary McAfee Atkins, donated money for the Nelson-Atkins Gallery of Art
- Simeon Brooks Armour, meat packing patriarch
- Tom Bass, African American horse trainer
- William Patterson Borland, Congressman; sculpture by Jorgen Dreyer
- James Dallas Bowser, journalist
- Sarah Chandler Coates
- Kersey Coates, real estate developer
- Abram Comingo, Congressman
- William F. "Bill" Davis, Kansas City's first African-American policeman
- Milton Feld, Walt Disney cartoonist
- Hiram Fosdick Dovol, Civil War general
- Thomas Hackney, congressman
- Morris Helzberg, founder of Helzberg Diamonds
- Zeralda James, Jesse James's wife (moved later)
- James Johnson Lindley, Congressman
- Robert Lee, member of the Wild Bunch
- Jacob Loose, Hydrox cookie maker and namesake of Loose Park, has a mausoleum
- August Meyer, engineer and first president of the newly formed Board of Parks Commissioners, who hired George Kessler
- John William Reid, congressman
- Frank Ringo, baseball player
- James Jordan Squier, capitalist
- William Warner, Congressman
- John W. Wofford (1837–1907), judge and member of the Georgia State Senate and Georgia House of Representatives
