= Sam B. Strother =

American lawyer and politician (1871–1929)

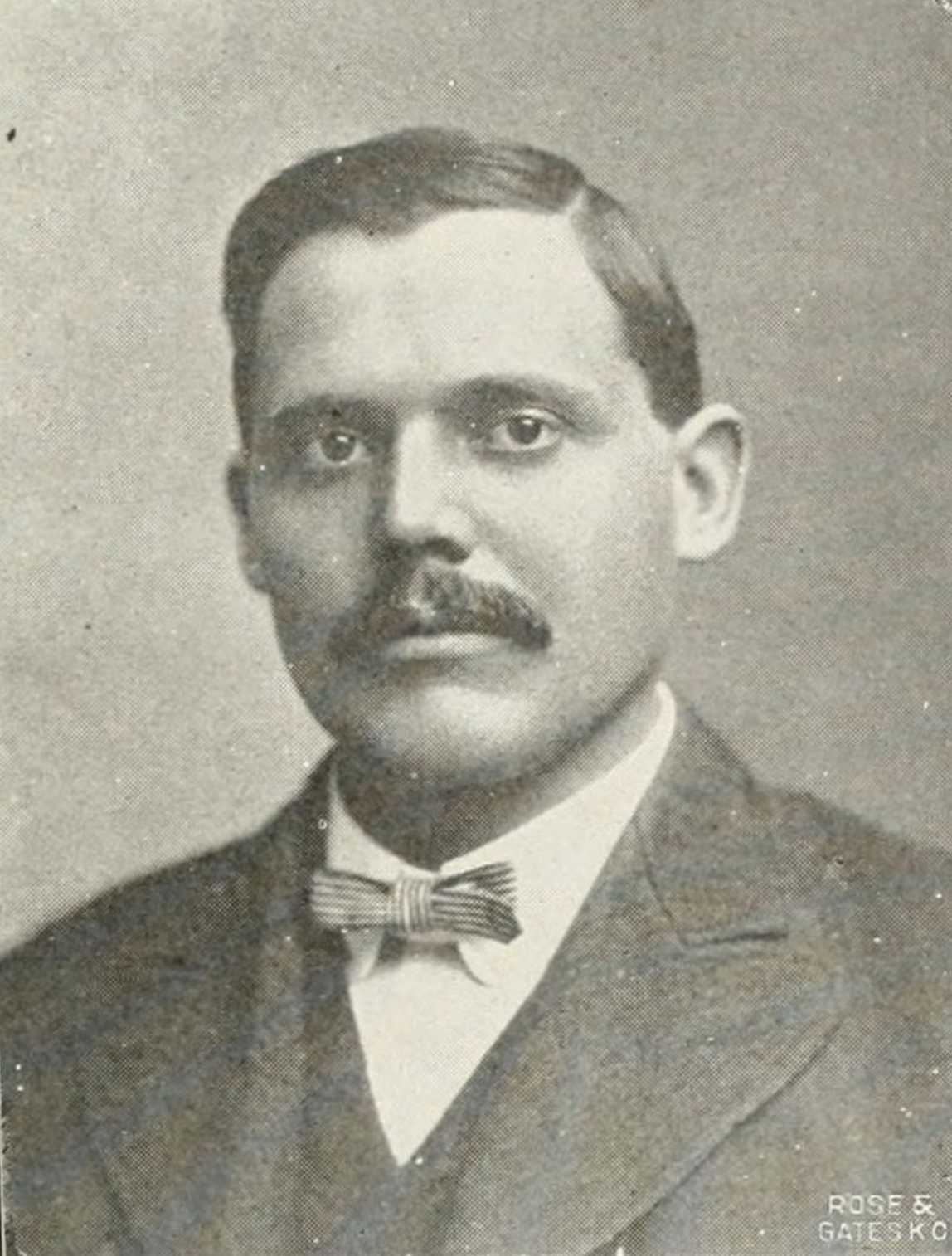
- Strother, c. 1902

40th Mayor of Kansas City
- In office January 1922 – May 1922
- Preceded by: James Cowgill
- Succeeded by: Frank H. Cromwell

Personal details
- Born: June 16, 1871 Louisville, Kentucky, U.S.
- Died: January 19, 1929 (aged 57) Kansas City, Missouri, U.S.
- Party: Democratic
- Spouse: Maud Davenport
- Education: University of Missouri School of Law
- Occupation: Lawyer; politician

Sam B. Strother (June 16, 1871 – January 19, 1929) was an American lawyer and politician. He served as the mayor of Kansas City, Missouri, from January to May 1922.

== Biography ==
Strother was born on June 16, 1871, near Louisville, Kentucky. His brother was lawyer George B. Strother. His family moved to Lee's Summit, Missouri, when he was young. He attended local schools and Kansas City High School. He graduated from the University of Missouri School of Law in 1893.

After graduating, Strother became the private secretary of Mayor William S. Cowherd. After Cowherd left office, Strother joined the law office of Teasdale, Ingraham & Cowherd. He then formed his own law firm. He was a lawyer and "public administrator" of Jackson County in 1903. In 1905, he and his brother George operated in the same office, though never officially partnered. He also served as chairman of the democratic central committee.

Strother was appointed mayor by city council to fill the term of James Cowgill, following his death in office. He served from January to May 1922.

Strother married Maud Davenport. They had at least one child, Isabelle. Strother died on January 19, 1929, aged 57, at the Research Hospital in Kansas City.

Political offices
Preceded by James Cowgill	Mayor of Kansas City, Missouri; 1922	Succeeded by Frank H. Cromwell
