= George M. Shelley =

American mayor and businessman (c. 1850–1927)

George Madison Shelley
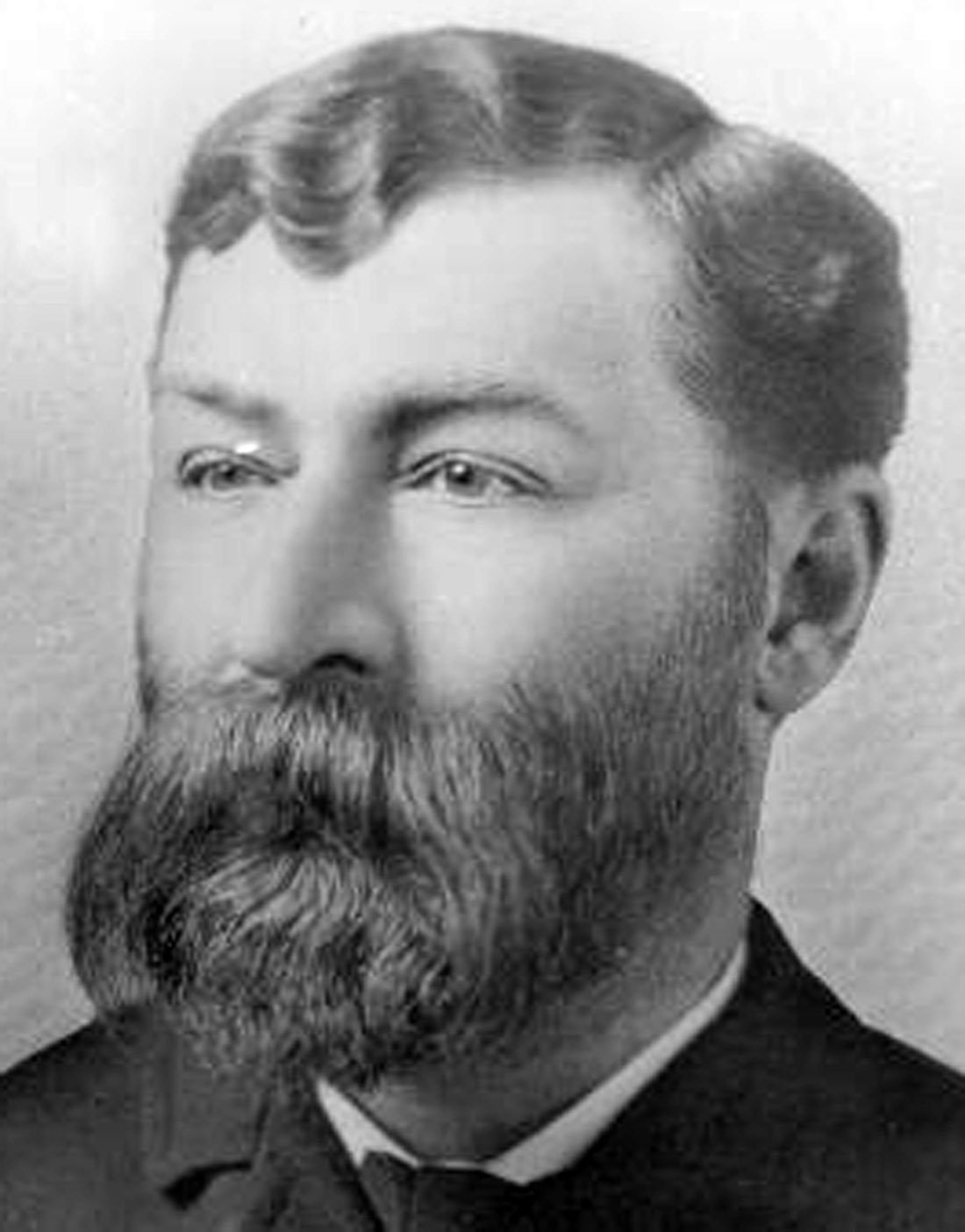
- Portrait of Shelley (c. 1902)

19th Mayor of Kansas City, Missouri
- In office 1878–1879
- Preceded by: James W. L. Slavens
- Succeeded by: Charles A. Chace

Personal details
- Born: c. 1850 Calloway County, Kentucky, U.S.
- Died: January 5, 1929 Kansas City, Missouri, U.S.
- Resting place: Forest Hill Calvary Cemetery; Kansas City, Missouri, U.S.
- Party: Democratic
- Spouses: Scioto McAdow (m. 1872; died 1907) Julia A. W. Baker (m. 1917)
- Children: 5
- Education: University of Chicago; Princeton University
- Occupation: Businessman; politician

George Madison Shelley (c. 1850 – January 5, 1929) was the mayor of Kansas City, Missouri, from 1878 to 1879.

== Early life ==
George Madison Shelley was born in about 1850 in Calloway County, Kentucky. Shortly after his birth, his family moved to Keokuk, Iowa, and he spent his boyhood years there. He attended schools in Keokuk, attended the University of Chicago. He then attended Princeton University. He then traveled two years; visiting Italy, China, Japan, Australia, Central America and the West Indies. In 1868 or 1870, Shelley moved to Kansas City, Missouri.

== Career ==
In 1870, Shelley worked as a grocer and then worked in dry goods. He established Kansas City's first wholesale dry goods wholesale firm at Third Street and Delaware Street.

Shelley was a Democrat. In 1878, Shelley was elected as Mayor of Kansas City. He served two terms, from 1878 to 1879. While mayor, Shelley advocated for a new sewer system. Shelley established the Mayor's Christmas Tree Association, a charity event in Kansas City to support the needy. He was elected as police commissioner and served three terms. He then worked as city postmaster from 1888 to 1900. In 1900, President Grover Cleveland removed him from the position due to "factional differences".

In 1900, Shelley ran again for mayor, but lost to James A. Reed. In 1904, he ran again for mayor, but lost to Jay H. Neff. In 1901, he was elected president of the City Council and Board of Public Works. During his tenure he was to encourage the Exodusters movement through Kansas City to Kansas.

Shelley owned farm land in Kansas City, Kansas, Oklahoma, Texas and Arkansas. He also operated a store at Boonville Avenue in Springfield, Missouri. On June 14, 1910, Shelley filed for bankruptcy. A fire of his business at Delaware Street led to the need to file for bankruptcy. Shelley worked as manager of the Western Merchantile Company, a brokerage company, until his death.

== Personal life ==
Shelley married Scioto "Otie" McAdow of Chillicothe, Ohio, on December 12, 1872. They had three children, including James M. Shelley. His wife died on March 25, 1907. Shelley married Julia A. W. Baker around 1917. She was the editor of the publication Mother's Appeal. Later in life, Shelley lived at 3621 Wyoming Street. He had two more children, Joseph F. Shelley and Mrs. E. H. Oberholtz. At the time of his death, Shelley lived at 818 Wyandotte Street in Kansas City.

Shelley fell down stairs on January 3, 1929, and suffered a concussion and shoulder fracture. Shelley died a couple days later on January 5 at his home in Kansas City. Shelley was buried at Forest Hill Calvary Cemetery.

== Legacy ==
Shelley was the namesake of Shelley Park in Kansas City.

Political offices
Preceded by James W. L. Slavens	Mayor of Kansas City, Missouri; 1878–1879	Succeeded by Charles A. Chace
