= Alexander L. Harris =

American politician (1820–1898)

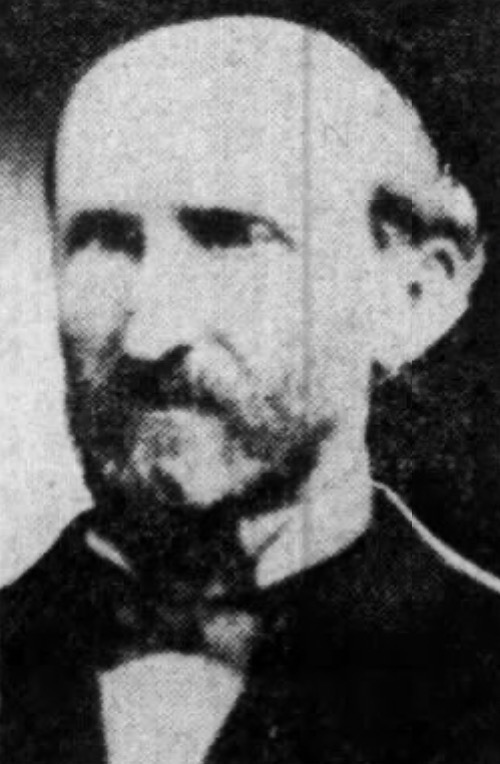

9th Mayor of Kansas City
- In office 1868–1869
- Preceded by: Edward H. Allen
- Succeeded by: Francis R. Long
- In office 1866–1867
- Preceded by: Patrick Shannon
- Succeeded by: Edward H. Allen

Personal details
- Born: October 9, 1820 Tennessee or Kentucky
- Died: August 27, 1898 (aged 77)
- Party: Democratic

Alexander L. Harris (October 9, 1820 – August 27, 1898) was an American politician. A Democrat, he was mayor of Kansas City, Missouri from 1866 to 1867, and from 1868 to 1869.

== Biography ==
Harris was born in either Tennessee or Kentucky. He operated a saloon near the Missouri River levee and was councilman from the first ward in 1861–1862.

He was elected mayor in 1866, failed re-election in 1867, and was elected again in 1868.

In 1870 was a deputy sheriff for Jackson County, Missouri, and became a county commissioner (called county judge) in 1871.

He was buried at Union Cemetery in Kansas City, Missouri.

Political offices
Preceded by Patrick Shannon	Mayor of Kansas City, Missouri; 1866–1867	Succeeded by Edward H. Allen
Preceded by Edward H. Allen	Mayor of Kansas City, Missouri; 1868–1869	Succeeded by Francis R. Long
