= George M. B. Maughs =

5th mayor of Kansas City, Missouri

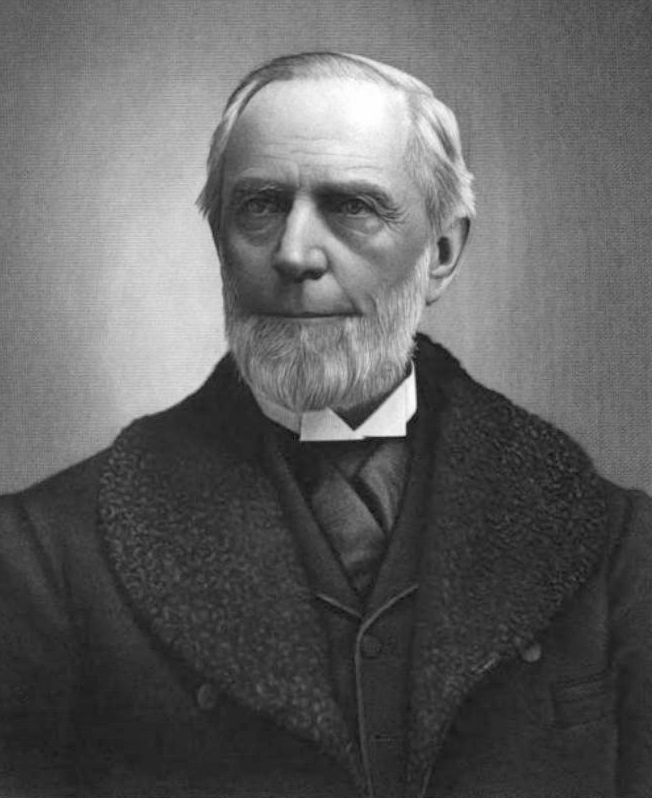

5th Mayor of Kansas City
- In office 1860–1861
- Preceded by: Milton J. Payne
- Succeeded by: Robert T. Van Horn

Personal details
- Born: George Madison Brown Maughs; February 23, 1821; Flemingsburg, Kentucky, U.S.
- Died: March 23, 1901 (aged 80); St. Louis, Missouri, U.S.
- Political party: Democratic
- Spouse: Ann M. Anderson (m. 1845–1892)

George Madison Brown Maughs (1821–1901) was a physician who served a one-year term as mayor of Kansas City, Missouri, in 1860.

== Biography ==
George M. B. Maughs was born in Flemingsburg, Kentucky, on February 23, 1821. He married Ann M. Anderson on March 12, 1845.

He came to Kansas City around 1855 and opened a medical practice on Main Street between 2nd and 3rd. He and T. S. Case published a short-lived medical journal, The Kansas City Review of Medicine and Surgery.

Favoring the South in the American Civil War he was among the several residents who had to leave the city during General Order No. 11. He did not return.

Maughs's wife died on November 6, 1892. He died in St. Louis on March 23, 1901.

Political offices
Preceded by Milton J. Payne	Mayor of Kansas City, Missouri; 1860–1861	Succeeded by Robert T. Van Horn
