= William Bonnifield =

American politician (1814–1875)

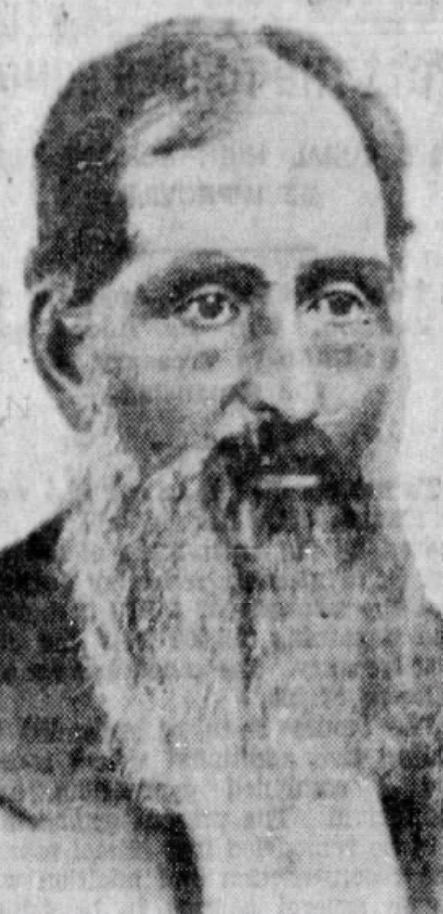

7th Mayor of Kansas City
- In office 1863–1863
- Preceded by: Milton J. Payne
- Succeeded by: Robert T. Van Horn

Personal details
- Born: September 14, 1814 Randolph County, Virginia, U.S.
- Died: November 18, 1875 (aged 61) Denver, Colorado, U.S.
- Party: Democratic

William Bonnifield (September 14, 1814 – November 18, 1875), also known as William Bounifield and William Bonnefield, was an American politician. He was the mayor of Kansas City, Missouri in 1863. He was a Unionist during his tenure, which of the city council opposed, so they cut his pay. He held office for one month, after which he resigned.

== Biography ==
He was born on September 14, 1814, in Randolph County, Virginia, the second son of Rhodham and Sarah Nancy (Minear) Bonnifield. Sarah Nancy Minear was the daughter of David and Catherine (Saylor) Minear. William attended Allegheny College in Meadville, Pennsylvania, in 1836/37 then joined his family in Iowa, where they had moved. Between 1839 and 1840 several members of the Bonnifield family died in a cholera epidemic, Rhodham and Sarah were among those who died. William, being the second oldest son, cared for his younger siblings on the farm until 1848. On August 3, 1843, Bonnifield married Sarah Ann Jackson in Henry County, Iowa. By 1860 Bonnifield and his family moved to Kansas City, Division Thirty-Five, Jackson County, Missouri. Bonnifield was a Democrat, pro-Union and anti-slavery. While living in Colorado, Bonnifield, along with the McGee family, mined in the Running Creek, Colorado, area.

== Accomplishments ==
- 1839: Bonnifield was the first elected surveyor of Jefferson County, Iowa and helped lay out the town of Fairfield and set the stakes for the first court house; he also assisted in the construction of the court house.
- 1843: Bonnifield was appointed as U.S. Postmaster for Lockridge, Jefferson, Iowa Territory (appointment date January 3, 1843).
- 1846: Bonnifield was a co-leader of the two democratic mass-meetings in Fairfield, Iowa when a constitution for the new State of Iowa was under consideration.
- 1863: Bonnifield was elected mayor of Kansas City; however, most of the city council had sided with the South and cut off Bonnifield ’s pay. He held office for one month, after which he resigned and moved to Denver, Colorado.
- 1875: November 18, 1875, Bonnifield died from injuries he had received the previous day, he was hauling a load of wood when the horses spooked, Bonnifield fell under the wagon wheels, which crushed several ribs on his left side and also injured his head and face.

Political offices
Preceded by Milton J. Payne	Mayor of Kansas City, Missouri; 1863	Succeeded by Robert T. Van Horn
