= James Gibson (Missouri politician) =

American lawyer, judge and politician (1849–1918)

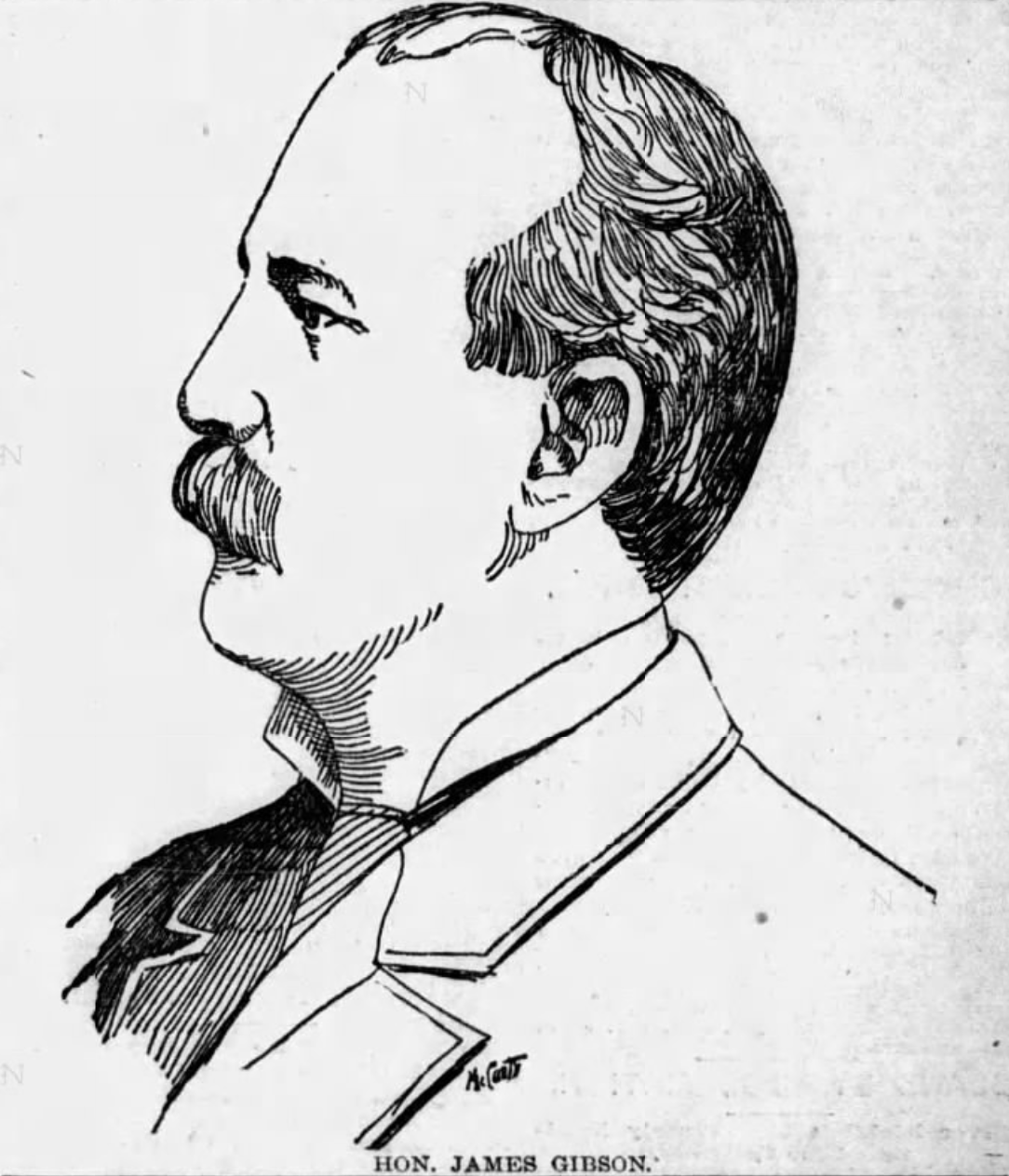
- Sketch of Gibson, 1896

23rd Mayor of Kansas City, Missouri
- In office 1883–1884
- Preceded by: Thomas B. Bullene
- Succeeded by: Leander J. Talbott

Personal details
- Born: November 19, 1849; Cooper County, Missouri, U.S.
- Died: December 12, 1918 (aged 69); Kansas City, Missouri, U.S.
- Resting place: Mount Washington Cemetery; Independence, Missouri, U.S.
- Political party: Democratic
- Spouse: Mary Todd Pence (m. 1880)
- Children: 2
- Occupation: Lawyer; judge; politician

James Gibson (November 19, 1849 – December 12, 1918) was an American lawyer, judge and politician. He served as Mayor of Kansas City, Missouri in 1883.

== Early life ==
James Gibson was born on November 19, 1849, in Cooper County, Missouri to John Gibson. Gibson was descended from John Bannister Gibson and Edward Rutledge. He attended Kemper Military School in Boonville.

== Career ==
In 1871, Gibson moved to Kansas City, Missouri. In 1877, Gibson was elected as city attorney of Kansas City and he was re-elected in 1878. In 1880, Gibson served as a presidential elector. In 1883, Gibson was elected as Mayor of Kansas City. Gibson was a Democrat.

Gibson was a member of the Jackson County Circuit Court from 1889 to 1904.

== Personal life ==
Gibson married Mary Todd Pence of Weston, Missouri, on November 18, 1880. They had one son and one daughter, James E. Gibson and Mrs. Burris McGie Little. His son was the general manager of the Kansas City Railways Company.

Gibson died on December 12, 1918, at his home in Kansas City. He was buried at Mount Washington Cemetery in Independence, Missouri.

Political offices
Preceded by Thomas B. Bullene	Mayor of Kansas City, Missouri; 1883–1884	Succeeded by Leander J. Talbott
