= Francis R. Long =

Mayor of Kansas City (1869–1870)

11th Mayor of Kansas City
- In office 1869–1870
- Preceded by: Alexander L. Harris
- Succeeded by: Elijah M. McGee

Personal details
- Born: Francis Reid Long; May 19, 1812 Woodford County, Kentucky, U.S.
- Died: June 22, 1881 (aged 69) Kansas City, Missouri, U.S.
- Resting place: Elmwood Cemetery
- Party: Republican
- Spouse: Miss Branham
- Children: 3
- Occupation: Politician; banker

Francis Reid Long (May 19, 1812 – June 22, 1881) was Kansas City Mayor in 1869 and founder of what would become Commerce Bancshares.

== Early life ==
Long was born in Woodford County, Kentucky.

== Career ==
Around 1841, Long moved to Clay County, Missouri. He was there elected as sheriff.

Long moved to Kansas City in 1865. He started a banking business with Church White in Kansas City. He joined with Nathaniel Grant and A.S. Branham to found the Long, Grant & Company which in turn would become the Kansas City Savings Association.

During Long's term the Hannibal Bridge—the first bridge to cross the Missouri River—opened. The bridge would establish Kansas City as the dominant city in the region. With the bridge came the founding of the Kansas City Stockyards. After his tenure as mayor, he was elector as justice of the peace and served in that role until 1880.

== Personal life ==
Long married Miss Branham of Kentucky. They had one son and two daughters. His wife predeceased him. He lived on Forest Avenue in Kansas City. He was a member of the Independent Order of Odd Fellows.

Long died at his home in Kansas City on June 22, 1881. He was buried at Elmwood Cemetery.

Political offices
Preceded by Alexander L. Harris	Mayor of Kansas City, Missouri; 1869–1870	Succeeded by Elijah M. McGee
