= John Johnson (Kansas City mayor) =

Architect and 3rd mayor of Kansas City, Missouri (1855)

John W. Johnston

3rd Mayor of Kansas City
- In office 1855–1855
- Preceded by: Johnston Lykins
- Succeeded by: Milton J. Payne

Personal details
- Born: 1816 England
- Died: 1903 (aged 86–87)
- Party: Democratic
- Profession: Architect

John Johnson (1816–1903) was an architect who designed the original Coates House in Kansas City, Missouri, which subsequently became the hotel that is on the National Register of Historic Places, and was partially destroyed in 1978 in Kansas City's worst hotel fire, which took the lives of 20 individuals. He also served as the 3rd mayor of Kansas City, Missouri.

Johnson was born in England and moved to New York City in the 1840s and then to Milwaukee, Wisconsin. He moved to Kansas City in 1852 where he platted portions of the soon to be incorporated community of Kansas.

He designed Kansas City's first City Hall at 4th and Main (a two-story brick building that included the police department and jail on the first floor).

Johnson resigned 35 days after being elected Kansas City's third mayor.

He designed the Coates House in 1857. The foundation would be laid but construction would be delayed until after the American Civil War.

In 1859 it is believed he moved to Wallula in Leavenworth County, Kansas

Political offices
Preceded by Johnston Lykins	Mayor of Kansas City, Missouri; 1855	Succeeded by Milton J. Payne
