= Albert I. Beach =

American lawyer and politician (1883–1939)

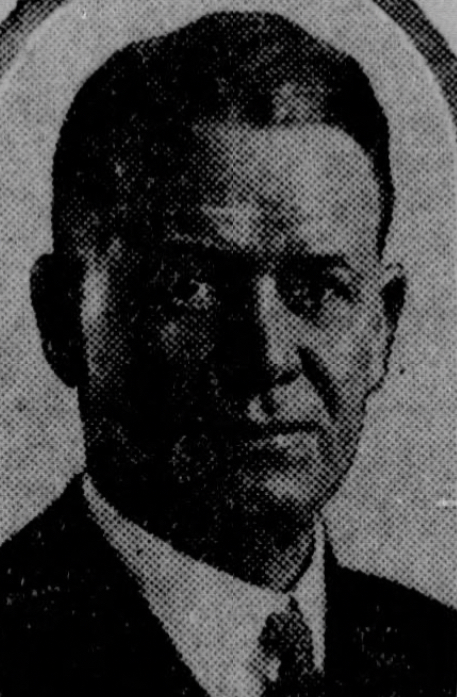
- Beach in a 1927 publication of the Juneau Empire

42nd Mayor of Kansas City
- In office 1924–1930
- Preceded by: Frank H. Cromwell
- Succeeded by: Bryce B. Smith

Personal details
- Born: Albert Isaac Beach; July 30, 1883 Olathe, Kansas, U.S.
- Died: January 21, 1939 (aged 55)
- Resting place: Forest Hill Calvary Cemetery; Kansas City, Missouri, U.S.
- Party: Republican
- Spouse: Marjorie Marshall (m. 1907)
- Education: University of Kansas; Washington University in St. Louis

Albert Isaac Beach (July 30, 1883 – January 21, 1939) was an American lawyer and politician. He served as the 42nd mayor of Kansas City, Missouri, from 1924 to 1930, and was the final mayor to be elected before the city adopted the city manager form of government.

== Biography ==
Beach was born on July 30, 1883, in Olathe, Kansas. A 1905 graduate of the University of Kansas in 1905, he received his law degree from Washington University School of Law in 1907. He was known for his extraverted personality.

Beach moved to Kansas City, Missouri in 1908 and was elected to the city council from the fifth ward in 1910, then the fourth ward in 1912. In 1924, he was elected mayor, remaining in office until 1930. During his political career, he ran on reform campaigns. He officially intended to make the city government more efficient, though backed the referendum to turn it into a city manager government, which reduced the power of the mayoral office. The first city manager, Henry F. McElroy, took office in 1926, and was given the mayor's original office. Beach was moved into a small office.

As mayor, Beach developed Kansas City's zoning board. He also oversaw the construction of the city-owned Charles B. Wheeler Downtown Airport and General Hospital No. 2.

Beach hosted the 1928 Republican National Convention, which was held at Convention Hall in Kansas City.

Beach retired from politics and practiced law in Kansas City. He spent his later life taking heart medication. He died on January 21, 1939, aged 55, of a heart attack, as he and his wife were getting ready for a dinner party. At the time of his death, he and his wife had planned trips to Topeka, Kansas and Chicago. He was buried at Forest Hill Calvary Cemetery, in Kansas City, on January 23.

Political offices
Preceded by Frank H. Cromwell	Mayor of Kansas City, Missouri; 1924–1930	Succeeded by Bryce B. Smith
