= Patrick Shannon (mayor) =

Mayor of Kansas City, Missouri (1864-1865)

8th Mayor of Kansas City
- In office 1864–1866
- Preceded by: Robert T. Van Horn
- Succeeded by: Alexander L. Harris

Personal details
- Born: Patrick Shannon; 1824 County Cavan, Ireland
- Died: December 16, 1871 (aged 46–47) Kansas City, Missouri, U.S.
- Party: Democratic

Military service
- Allegiance: Confederate States of America
- Rank: Major
- Battles/wars: American Civil War

Patrick Shannon (1824 – December 16, 1871) was the 8th mayor of Kansas City, Missouri, serving from 1864 to 1866.

== Biography ==
Shannon was born in 1824 in County Cavan, Ireland. He immigrated to Kansas City in 1855, where he operated a dry goods business at Main and Front Streets. He was elected to the city council in 1861. During the American Civil War, he joined the Confederates and rose from private to major. He was elected to the council again in 1864 and became mayor of Kansas City in 1865. He was re-elected to another term the following year.

During his term the Missouri Pacific Railroad reached Kansas City, the first volunteer fire department was raised, and the first gas lights were lit.

He was buried in St. Mary's Cemetery.

Political offices
Preceded by Robert T. Van Horn	Mayor of Kansas City, Missouri; 1864–1866	Succeeded by Alexander L. Harris
