= Edward H. Allen =

Mayor of Kansas City (1867-1868)

10th Mayor of Kansas City
- In office 1867–1868
- Preceded by: Alexander L. Harris
- Succeeded by: Alexander L. Harris

Personal details
- Born: April 24, 1830 Danbury, Connecticut, U.S.
- Died: December 1, 1895 (aged 65) Kansas City, Missouri, U.S.
- Resting place: Elmwood Cemetery; Kansas City, Missouri, U.S.
- Political party: Republican

Edward Herrick Allen (April 24, 1830 – December 1, 1895) was a Republican Kansas City Mayor in 1867.

== Biography ==
Allen was born in Danbury, Connecticut and claimed a Mayflower ancestry. He graduated from Marietta College and later Lane Seminary in Cincinnati. In 1859 he married Agnes Beecher, niece of Henry Ward Beecher.

He was a member of the Grand Army of the Republic during the American Civil War. He came to Kansas City after the War and was one of the founders of the Kansas City Board of Trade and was president of First National Bank. He promoted the use of coal gas to light the city. In 1882, he was one of the original incorporators of the Kansas City Club.

He died in 1895 and is interred in Elmwood Cemetery.

Political offices
| Preceded by Alexander L. Harris | Mayor of Kansas City, Missouri; 1867–1868 | Succeeded by Alexander L. Harris |
