= Emery, Bird, Thayer Dry Goods Company =

Department store in Kansas City, Missouri, US

- Emery, Bird and Thayer Building
- Formerly listed on the U.S. National Register of Historic Places
- Emery, Bird, Thayer Dry Goods Company
- Location: 1016–1018 Grand Ave., Kansas City, Missouri
- Area: 0.8 acres (0.32 ha)
- Built: 1889
- Architect: Van Brunt & Howe; Henry Van Brunt
- Architectural style: Free Romanesque
- NRHP reference No.: 72001561
- Removed from NRHP: January 1, 1999

Emery, Bird, Thayer & Company was a department store in Downtown Kansas City that traced its history nearly to the city's origins as Westport Landing.

== History ==
The store was started by Kersey Coates and William Gillis in the 1860s in the then Town of Kansas at the corner of Missouri Avenue and Main Street. Although initially outfitting travelers on the Oregon Trail and Santa Fe Trail, it soon became more upscale. It moved to a new three-story building at Seventh and Main.

The original Coates and Gillis store became Coates and Bullene when it merged with a store operated by Thomas B. Bullene. It then became the Bullene, Moore and Emery department store. The store got its final name in the 1890s from the investors W. E. Emery, Joseph Taylor Bird. Sr. and William B. Thayer.

In the 1890s, it opened a new building occupying a full block along East 11th Street from Walnut to Grand, designed by the architectural firm of Van Brunt & Howe. It soon became the prime attraction on the city's main retail thoroughfare, popularly known as "Petticoat Lane," and became famed for its Tea Room.

Although the store attempted to expand, opening a branch on the Country Club Plaza in 1925 (enlarged in 1963) and purchasing the Bundschu store on the courthouse square in Independence, it could not keep pace with changing retail fashions and settlement patterns, and in 1968 it closed, with the loss of 800 jobs.

The store closed in 1968, and its building, which was on the National Register of Historic Places, was torn down in 1971.

After the downtown location was demolished, UMB Financial Corporation constructed a building on the site, retaining a few architectural elements from the EBT building. Until December 2015, a restaurant called EBT, at 103d Street and State Line Road near I-435, housed memorabilia from the store. The firm's warehouse at 16th and Walnut has been converted into residential lofts. During the renovation, lettering on the side of the warehouse reading "Emery Bird Thayer Warehouse" was repainted.
