= Value Line Composite Index =

Broad-based stock index

The Value Line Composite Index (VLCI) are two futures market indices published by Value Line, both comprising 1,681 publicly listed companies on the NYSE, NYSE American, NASDAQ, and TSX stock exchanges. They include all components of the company's Value Line Investment Survey except for closed-end funds, designed to be representative of the North American equity market. The VLCI was initially released on June 30, 1961 as the Value Line Geometric Composite Index, an equally weighted index using a geometric average. Since February 1, 1988 the VLCI has also included the Value Line Arithmetic Composite Index, a similar index that instead uses an arithmetic average.

The daily price change of the Value Line Geometric Composite Index is found by multiplying the ratio of each stock's closing price to its previous closing price, and raising that result to the reciprocal of the total number of stocks. The daily price change of the Value Line Arithmetic Composite Index is calculated by adding the daily percent change of all the stocks, and then dividing by the total number of stocks.

While the Kansas City Board of Trade (KCBT) made use of the indices since 1982, it shifted exchange distribution to NYSE’s Global Index Feed on August 30, 2013.
