= Eldridge House =

Historic house in Massachusetts, United States

- U.S. National Register of Historic Places
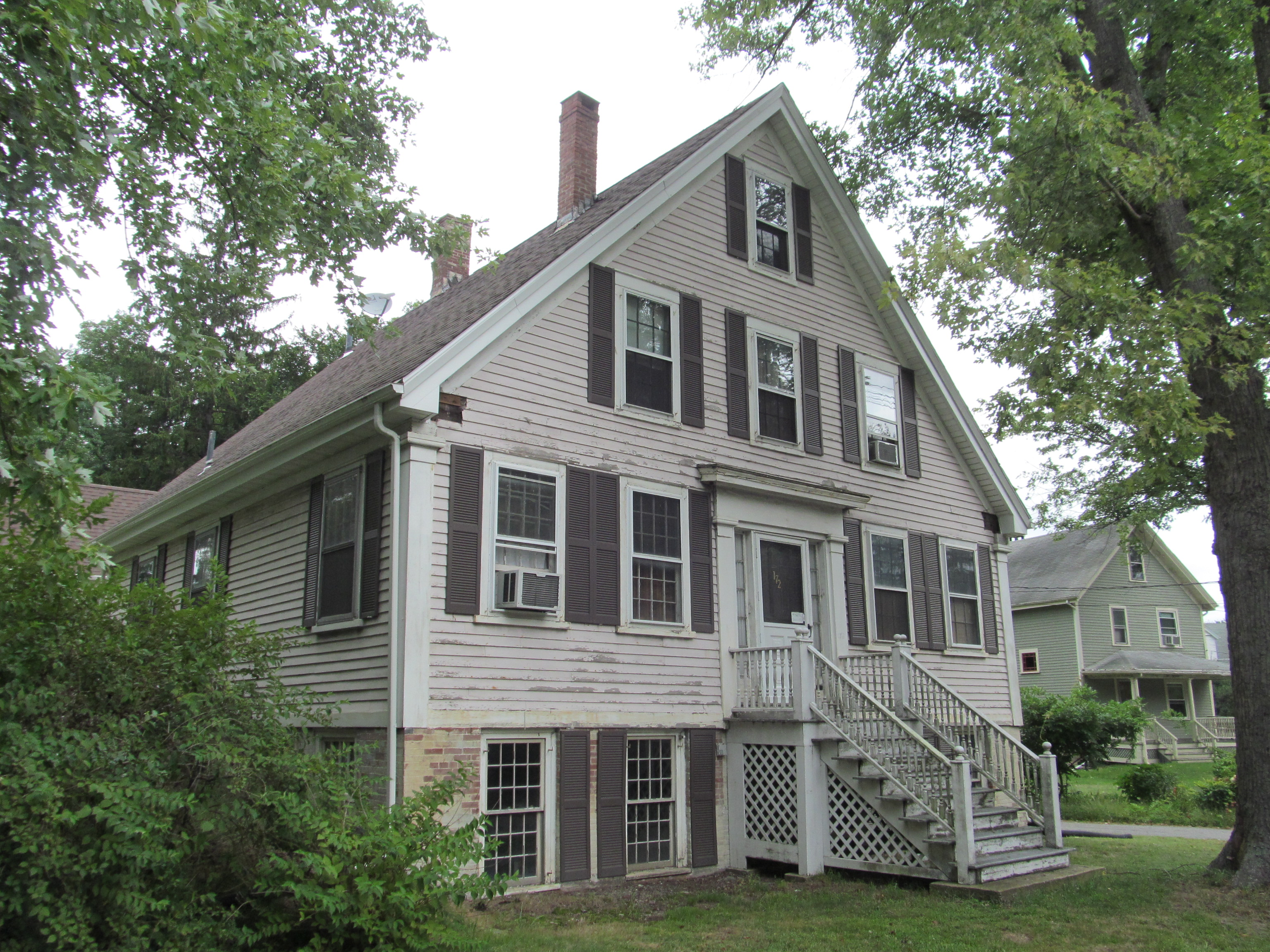
- Eldridge House

- Location within Massachusetts Location within the United States
- Location: 172 County St., Taunton, Massachusetts
- Coordinates: 41°53′45″N 71°4′38″W
- Area: 0.77 acres (0.31 ha)
- Built: c. 1850
- Architectural style: Greek Revival
- MPS: Taunton MRA
- NRHP reference No.: 84002114
- Added to NRHP: July 5, 1984

The Eldridge House is a historic house located at 172 County Street in Taunton, Massachusetts.

== Description and history ==
It is a 2 1/2-story, wood-framed structure, with a five-bay wide front facade and an unusually broad front-facing gable roof with two levels within it. It was built for a laborer in about 1850 in the Greek Revival style; its form is very rare for southeastern New England, and is more commonly found in northern Worcester County, southern New Hampshire and in the Connecticut River valley.

The house was added to the National Register of Historic Places on July 5, 1984.

== See also ==
- National Register of Historic Places listings in Taunton, Massachusetts
