= Leander J. Talbott =

American politician (1849–1924)

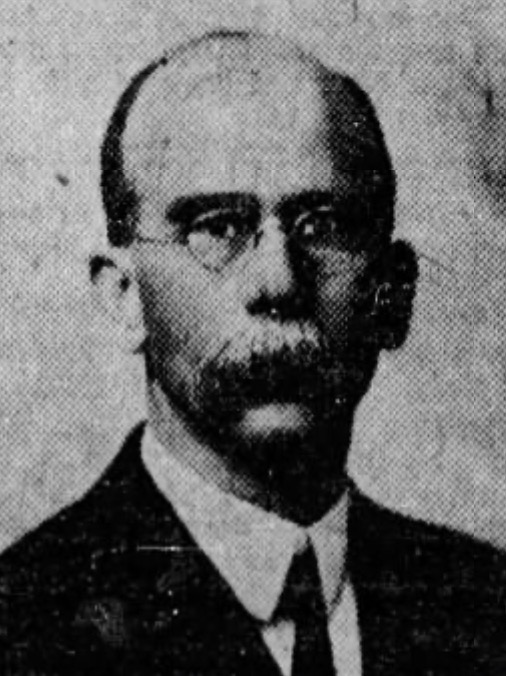

24th Mayor of Kansas City, Missouri
- In office 1884–1885
- Preceded by: James Gibson
- Succeeded by: John W. Moore

Personal details
- Born: August 13, 1849 Meigs County, Ohio, US
- Died: July 23, 1924 (aged 74)
- Party: Democratic

Leander J. Talbott (August 13, 1849 – July 23, 1924) was an American politician. A Democrat, he served as mayor of Kansas City, Missouri, in 1884.

== Biography ==
Talbott was born in rural Meigs County, Ohio, one of eight children of Joshua and Adeline L. (Williamson) Talbott. His father, an Ohio native, was a farmer and miller. The family moved to Kansas City in 1857, where he was educated in the local schools. He entered the real estate business and eventually became active in local Democratic politics.

On September 7, 1876, Talbott married Carrie Madeira, a daughter of the Rev. Dr. Madeira, formerly pastor of the Central Presbyterian Church of Kansas City. They had two sons and one daughter—Addison M., Lee J., and Dorothy. Talbott was elected as the city auditor in 1876, 1877, and 1878.

As mayor he is said to have ridden the first overhead electric interurban in the world (established by J. C. Henry with the Westport Electric Railway in Kansas City) In 1882, he was one of the original incorporators of the Kansas City Club.

He died in an automobile accident in 1924.

Political offices
| Preceded by James Gibson | Mayor of Kansas City, Missouri; 1884–1885 | Succeeded by John W. Moore |
