= Sarah Chandler Coates =

Sarah Chandler Coates (March 10, 1829– July 25, 1897) was an abolitionist and suffragette. She was known as the "Queen of Quality Hill," where she was a social leader.

== Biography ==
Sarah Chandler Coates was born in Lancaster, Pennsylvania on March 10, 1829 to John W. and Maria Jane Chandler, a Quaker family. She was a member of the Progressive Friends’ Society of Longwood as a child which influenced her activist bent later in life.

Chandler was invested in education early in life. She learned and taught human physiology as a young girl. She attended Samuel Martin's boarding school where she graduated at age 16 and began to teach. She was a member of the Young Ladies Lyceum of Kennett Square, and attended John Simmons Seminary where she earned a certificate of proficiency.

In 1855, she married Kersey Coates, a fellow Quaker with anti-slavery beliefs. Coates was a member of the Philadelphia Emigrant Aid Society, an organization attempting to sponsor Northern antislavery settler to move west into Kansas during the Bleeding Kansas era. Kersey went west as an agent to purchase land. In 1856, he moved Sarah west with him. Seeing her new city, she remarked, "And this is to be my home?"

Sarah Coates was an antislavery activist in Kansas City from 1856 through the American Civil War. Both before and during that conflict, the Coates' status as antislavery advocates placed a target on them from fellow Missourians. The couple took precautions against violence, like sleeping with pistols under their bed, despite their Quaker pacifism.

After the war, Kersey Coates became a leading real estate developer, constructing Quality Hill, one of the original wealthy neighborhoods in the Kansas City area. Through this real estate investment, the Coates became some of the most wealthy and influential people in the city.

Sarah Coates used this wealth and influence to educate and promote social programs in the city. Most prominently, she avidly promoted women's suffrage in Kansas City and was close friends with Susan B. Anthony.

Coates was a prominent social organizer in the area. She founded nine clubs and associations around the city, including the Woman’s Suffrage Club, the Women’s Christian Association, the Equal Suffrage Association of Kansas City, and the Kansas City Woman’s Exchange.

Many of these clubs focused not just on women's social connections, but on activism and progressive policies for which Coates advocated.

Coates died on July 25, 1897. Thousands attended her funeral. As a tribute to her mother, her daughter Laura Coates Reed wrote a biography of her.
