= John W. Wofford (politician) =

American politician and judge (1837–1907)

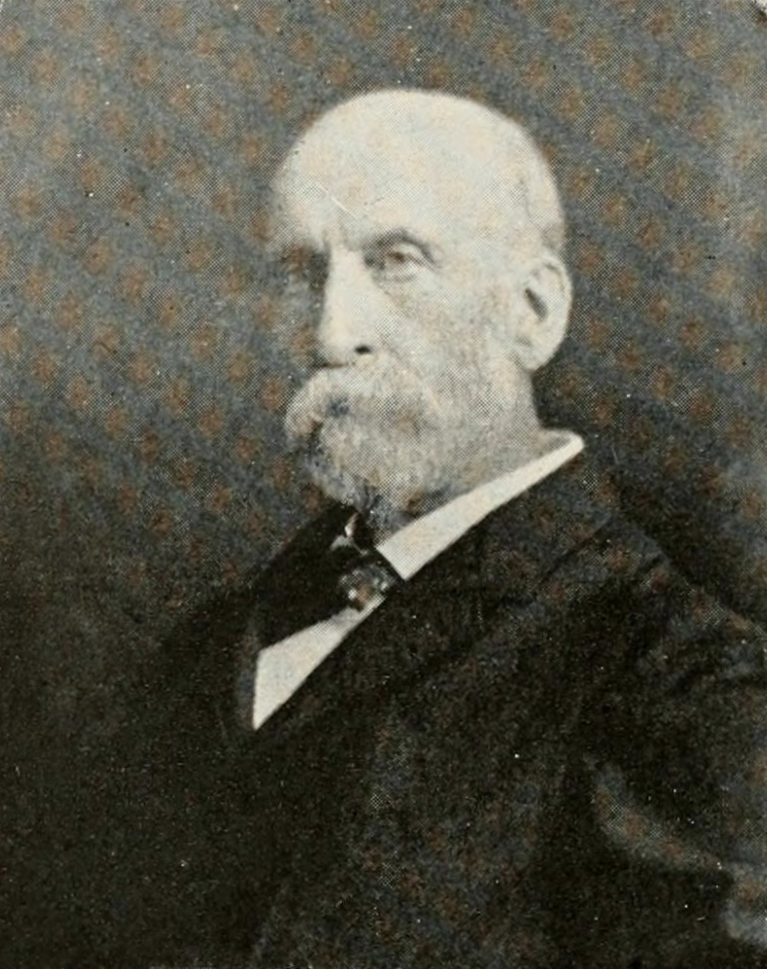
- Photo of Wofford (c. 1902)

Member of the Georgia State Senate
- In office 1872–1875

Member of the Georgia House of Representatives
- In office 1871

Personal details
- Born: August 14, 1837 Habersham County, Georgia, U.S.
- Died: February 25, 1907 (aged 69) Kansas City, Missouri, U.S.
- Resting place: Elmwood Cemetery; Kansas City, Missouri, U.S.
- Party: Democratic
- Spouse: Cornelia E. Trescott (m. 1860; died 1903)
- Children: 11
- Occupation: Soldier; lawyer; politician; judge
- Military career
- Allegiance: Confederate States
- Branch: Confederate States Army
- Service years: 1861–1865
- Rank: Second lieutenant
- Conflicts: American Civil War; Battle of North Anna

John W. Wofford (August 14, 1837 – February 25, 1907) was an American politician and judge. He served in the Georgia House of Representatives and Georgia State Senate.

== Early life ==
John W. Wofford was born on August 14, 1837, in Habersham County, Georgia. His father was a farmer. He attended common schools in Habersham County. In 1858, Wofford studied law and continued his studies until 1861. After the Civil War, Wofford resumed his studies and started a law practice at Cartersville, Georgia.

== Career ==
Wofford served in the Confederate States Army in the Civil War. He entered service as a private at the start of the war, and was later promoted to second lieutenant. He was promoted to adjutant of his regiment by the Confederate States Secretary of War. He was wounded at the Battle of North Anna on May 23, 1864.

In 1871, Wofford served in the Georgia House of Representatives. In 1872, Wofford started serving in the Georgia State Senate and resigned in 1875. Wofford served as a presidential elector in the 1876 United States presidential election. He was a Democrat.

In 1877, Wofford moved to Kansas City, Missouri. He established a law practice in 1877 and it continued until July 1892. In July 1892, Wofford was appointed by Missouri Governor David R. Francis as judge of the Jackson County Criminal Court. He was elected to the role in November 1892. Wofford was re-elected in 1898. Wofford supported the parole of juvenile criminals and held a class of paroled boys and men to support them.

== Personal life ==
Wofford married Cornelia E. Trescott of Charleston, South Carolina, in February 1860. His wife died in 1903. They had eleven children: Edwin Hampton, Ormond Prescott, Clarence, George, Campbell Wallace, John Jr., Gordon, Amelia, Louisa Carrere, Mrs. Larkin M. Tyler and Mrs. Frederick J. Lewis.

Wofford died at his home 1012 Vine Street in Kansas City on February 25, 1907. He was buried at Elmwood Cemetery in Kansas City.
