= Kansas City Board of Trade =

Former American futures exchange

- KCBT
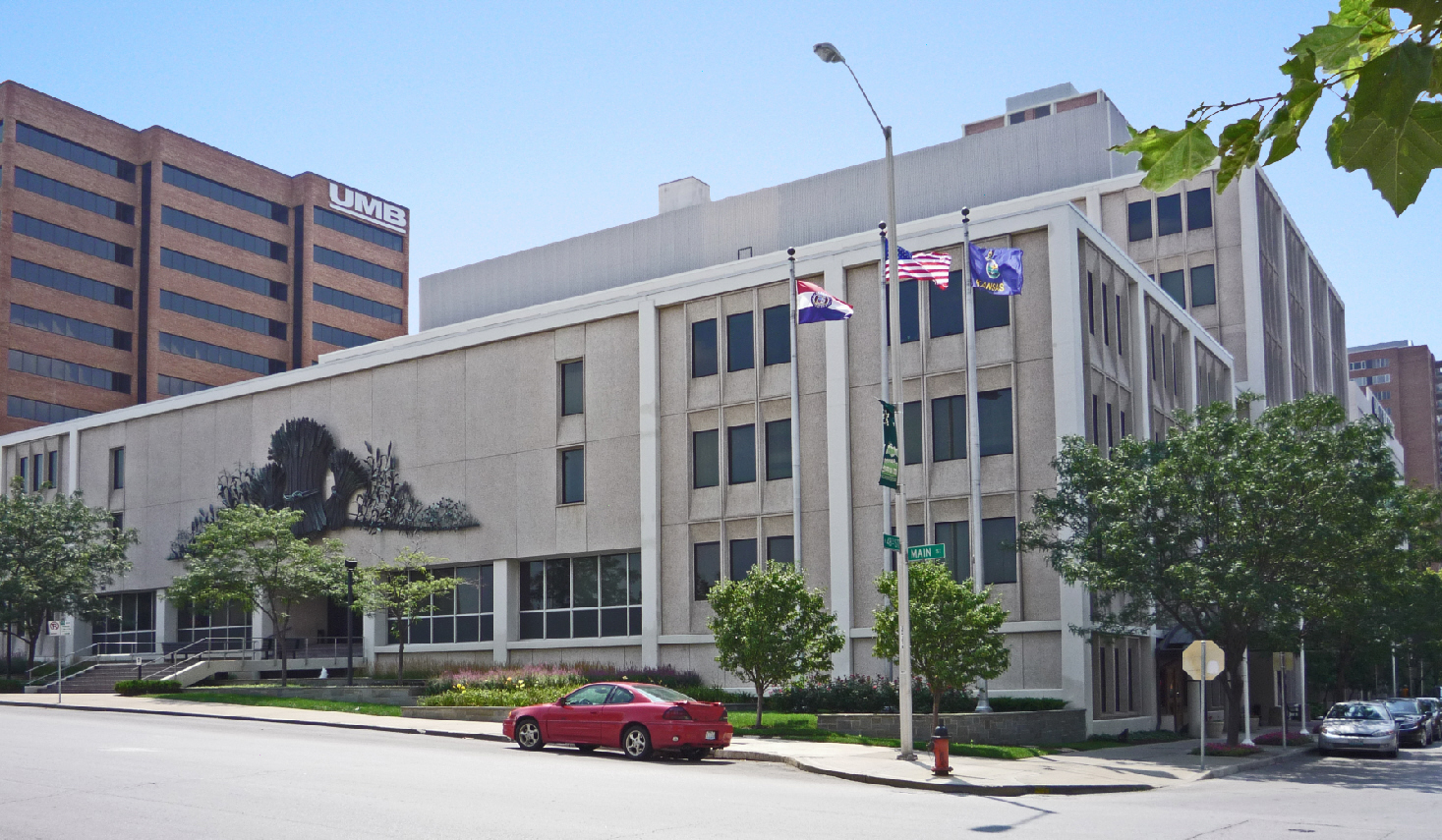
- Type: Commodity futures and options exchange
- Location: Kansas City, Missouri, United States
- Coordinates: 39°2′20.35″N 94°35′15.08″W
- Founded: 1856 (as a chamber of commerce); 1876 (formal charter)
- Owner: CME Group
- Currency: USD
- Commodities: Hard-red winter wheat
- Indices: Value Line Composite Index
- Website: www.kcbt.com

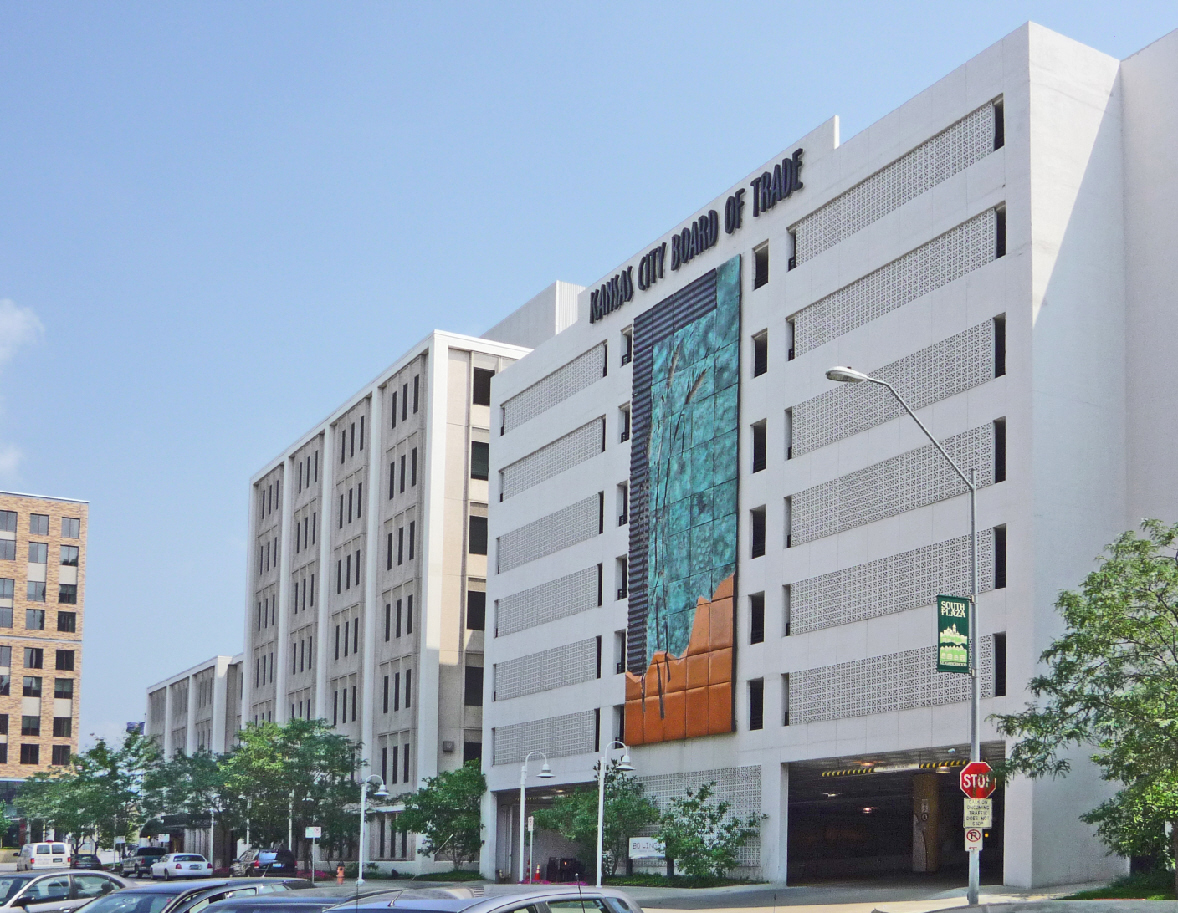
Kansas City Board of Trade, on West 48th Street (2008)

The Kansas City Board of Trade (KCBT) was an American commodity futures and options exchange regulated by the Commodity Futures Trading Commission. Specializing in the hard-red winter wheat contract, it was located at 4800 Main Street in Kansas City, Missouri.

On October 17, 2012, CME Group announced it would acquire the exchange for $126 million in cash. Under the terms, the Kansas City trading floor remained open for at least six months. KCBT market participants were to advise CME for at least three years. The trading floor was consolidated with the Chicago operations in June 2013 and ceased operation in Chicago on July 2, 2015.

== History ==
The exchange was organized in 1856, shortly after Kansas City itself was incorporated in 1853, and served as the city's chamber of commerce. It was formally chartered in 1876; among the exchange's founders was Edward H. Allen.

It was originally located at 8th and Wyandotte Streets.

Its building was designed by Chicago architects Burnham & Root, represented locally by Walter C. Root.

In 1925, the exchange moved to 10th and Wyandotte Streets and in 1966, it moved to its last location at 48th and Main Streets on the Country Club Plaza.

== Operations ==
The primary products traded at the exchange were futures contracts on hard red winter wheat, the principal ingredient of bread, as well as options derived from these. The hard red winter wheat contract now trades on the Chicago Board of Trade Designated Contract Market (DCM). Because of its nutritional value, the hard red winter wheat usually trades at a premium to the Chicago Board of Trade's soft red winter wheat. The exchange facilitated the transfer of ownership of the futures and options contracts through the open outcry system, then later through the electronic market.

In 1982, the exchange introduced Value Line futures, making it the first exchange offering a stock index futures contract. Options on Value Line futures were introduced in 1992. As of December 12, 2004, the Value Line futures began trade solely through an electronic trading platform. Value line futures have since been de-listed.

== Tours ==
Tours were conducted by marketing staff most trading-day mornings. The tours consisted of two parts: visitors would watch a short documentary about commodities futures and hard red winter wheat, then would be taken to the viewing gallery that overlooked the trading floor, where a marketing staff member would explain the trading process, prices on the board, and the importance of the commodities market.

== See also ==
- List of futures exchanges
- List of traded commodities
- Value Line Composite Index, traded on the futures market at the Kansas City Board of Trade
