= Kenney Krysko =

Kenneth Krysko
- Education: University of Florida; Florida International University; Florida State University
- Scientific career
- Fields: Herpetology
- Workplaces: Florida Museum of Natural History

Kenneth L. Krysko is an American herpetologist and wildlife biologist. He spent nearly his entire life in Florida and grew up in Seminole, Pinellas County, where he would always be outside catching snakes, lizards, and fish, or playing soccer. He attended St. Petersburg College (A.S.), Florida State University (B.S. in Biological Sciences), Florida International University (M.S. in Biological Sciences), and University of Florida (Ph.D. in Wildlife Ecology and Conservation). He began researching fishes under Dr. Skip Livingston at FSU and intended to become an ichthyologist. While a graduate student working under Dr. George Dalrymple at FIU, he began research on ecology and taxonomy of kingsnakes as well as introduced amphibians and reptiles. Subsequently, he spent >20 years at UF as a graduate student (5 years) and later as a research scientist in the Division of Herpetology (Florida Museum of Natural History) and Courtesy Faculty member in both Wildlife Ecology and Conservation and School of Natural Resources and Environment, conducting research around the world and teaching both undergraduate and graduate level courses. He is currently an Adjunct Professor at St. Petersburg College. He teaches environmental science, marine biology, and biology for undergraduate college credit. He is known best for his knowledge on snakes, lizards, fishes, and especially introduced and invasive species in Florida. Using morphology and molecular systematics (DNA), he formally described and named the Pakistan short-limbed bent-toed gecko (Cyrtopodion brachykolon), Gulf Coast indigo snake (Drymarchon kolpobasileus), Eastern Apalachicola kingsnake (Lampropeltis meansi), and Apalachicola Alligator Snapping Turtle (Macrochelys apalach(icolae) and Suwannee Alligator Snapping Turtle (M. suwanniensis). He walked >519 km (322 miles) of canal and levee banks researching Florida kingsnake ecology in the greater Everglades ecosystem in southern Florida. His passion for fishing led him to publish a fishing technique using a fishing rod with a tiny hook baited with crickets to capture Cuban knight anoles (Anolis equestris). He has been featured in numerous television shows, including an season 3 episode 5 (Gators in the Sewers) of MonsterQuest, dealing with the rumor about alligators living in the sewers of New York City.
