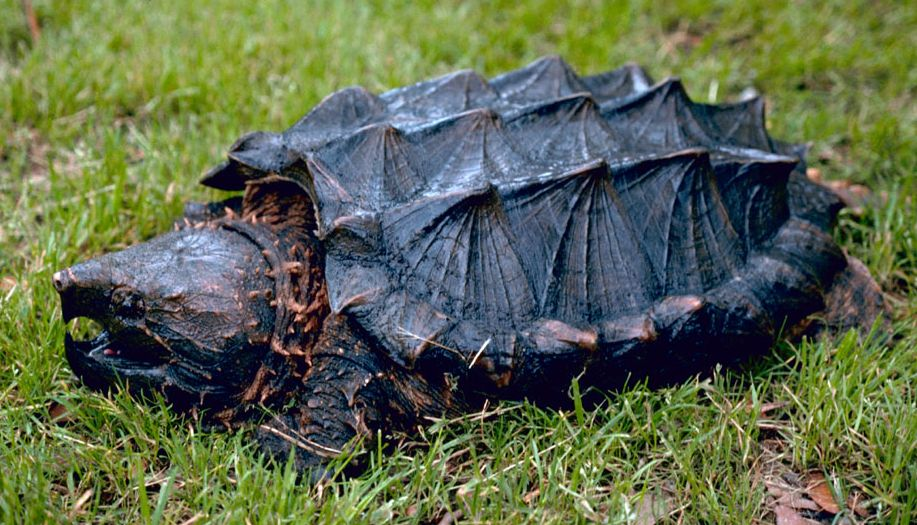
- Alligator snapping turtle (Macrochelys temminckii)

Scientific classification
- Kingdom: Animalia
- Phylum: Chordata
- Class: Reptilia
- Order: Testudines
- Suborder: Cryptodira
- Family: Chelydridae
- Genus: Macrochelys; Gray, 1856

Type species
- Macrochelys temminckii Troost, 1835

Synonyms
- Macroclemys Gray, 1856; Gypochelys Agassiz, 1857

= Macrochelys =

Macrochelys Temporal range: Miocene–Recent

Genus of turtles

Macrochelys is a genus of very large freshwater turtles in the family Chelydridae, native to the Southeastern and Midwestern United States. Only a single extant species was recognized until 2014, when a study divided it into two or possibly three species. These turtles are easily recognized by three distinct dorsal ridges with raised spikes.

== Extant species ==
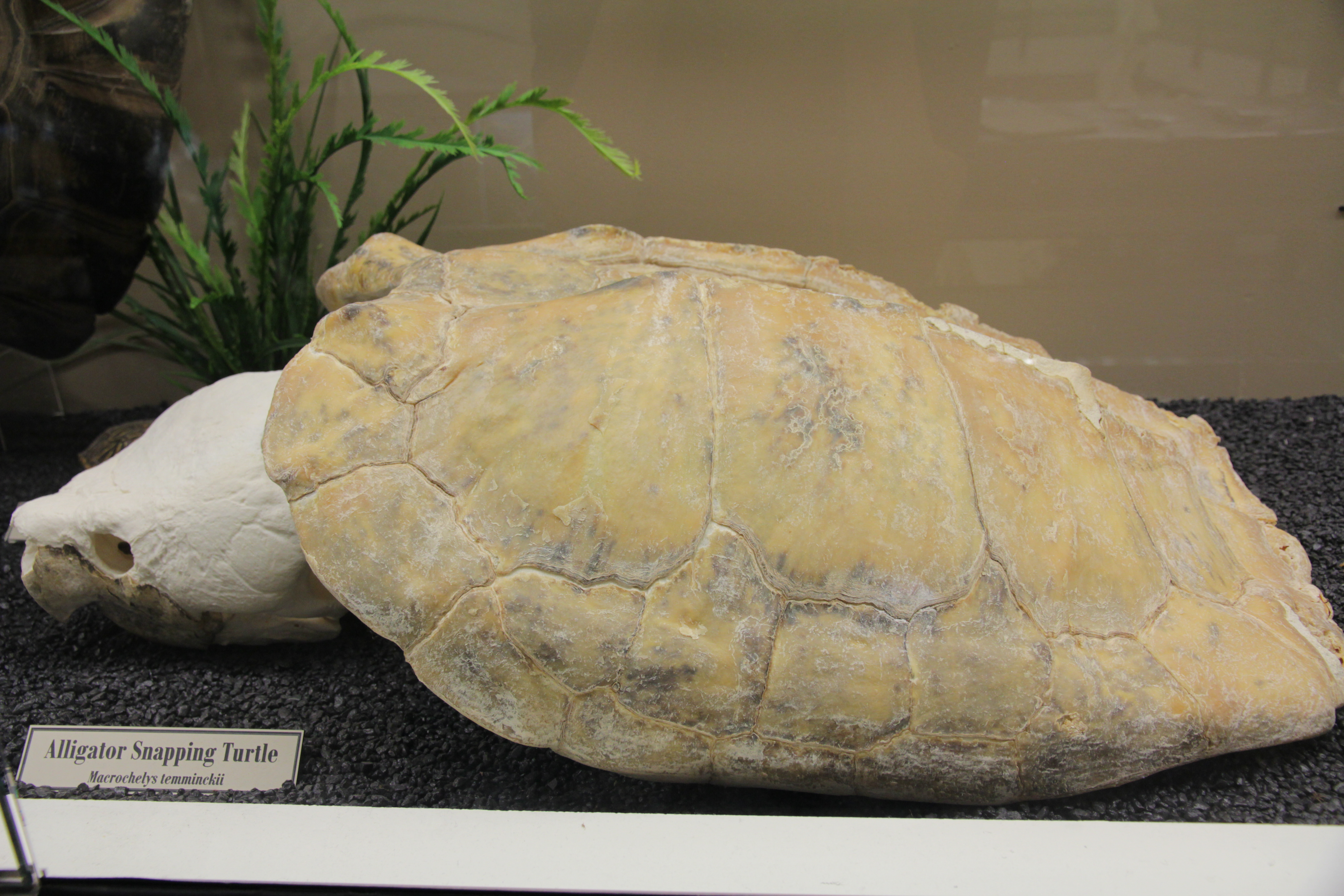
Skeleton of an alligator snapping turtle (Macrochelys temminckii) on display at the Museum of Osteology

Traditionally, only a single extant species (M. temminckii) was recognized, but following reviews, two species are now recognized: Anatomical differences between the two species of Macrochelys include the shape of the caudal notch at the rear of the carapace and the angle of the squamosal bone at the rear of the skull. The two species are estimated to have diverged less than 3.5 million years ago.

- Macrochelys suwanniensis Thomas et al., 2014 – Suwannee snapping turtle
- Macrochelys temminckii (Troost, 1835) – alligator snapping turtle

A third species has been proposed, but its validity is disputed. Neither the Reptile Database nor IUCN's Tortoise and Freshwater Turtle Specialist Group recognize it as separate from M. temminckii.

- Macrochelys apalachicolae Thomas et al., 2014 – Apalachicola snapping turtle

== Fossil history and extinct species ==
Unlike the family Chelydridae as a whole, the genus Macrochelys is exclusively North American. Hutchison (2008) considered the genus Chelydrops to be a junior synonym of Macrochelys, and recombined its type species, Chelydrops stricta from the Miocene (Early Barstovian) of Nebraska, as the (then) fourth species of Macrochelys.

There are two other species known only from fossil remains:

- †Macrochelys auffenbergi Dobie, 1968 (from the Middle Pliocene of Florida)
- †Macrochelys schmidti (from the Early Middle Miocene of Nebraska)
