= Gillis Opera House =

Opera house in Kansas City, Missouri, US

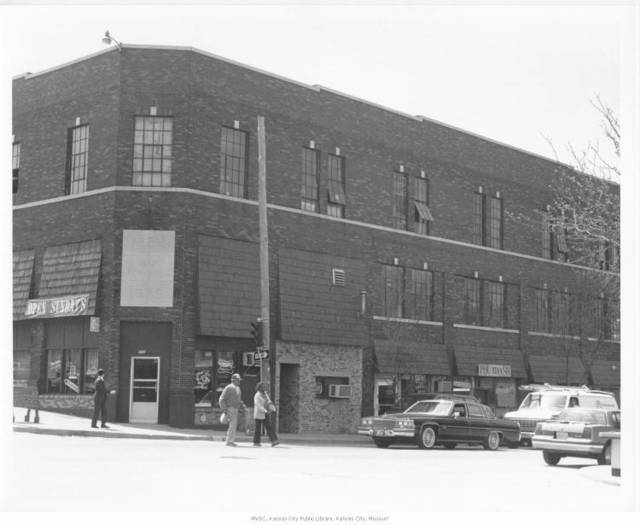
- The Gillis Building in 2016
- Interactive map of the Gillis Opera House area
- Alternative names: Gillis Building

General information
- Location: Kansas City, Missouri, United States
- Coordinates: 39.1083°N 94.5819°W
- Named for: William Gillis
- Opened: September 10, 1883
- Destroyed: June 25, 1925
- Cost: $140,000 (~ $3,000,000 in 2024)
- Landlord: Mary Ann Gillis

Technical details
- Floor count: 4

Design and construction
- Architect: Asa Beebe Cross

The Gillis Opera House, later rebuilt and renamed to the Gillis Building, was an opera house in Kansas City, Missouri. It was designed by Asa Beebe Cross and was commissioned by Mary Ann Gillis, the niece of William Gillis, who is also the namesake for the building.

== History ==
After William Gillis died on July 18, 1869, he left his entire inheritance of $500,000 (~ $11,000,000 in 2024) to his niece, Mary Ann. She used the money to construct the opera house. The building was designed by Asa Beebe Cross, and was 4 stories tall.

The opera house opened on September 10, 1883, and mayor James Gibson and senator William Warner gave speeches to commemorate the opening. The seats were cheap, with the most expensive ones being $20. Proceeds from the opera house were used to fund the Gillis Orphans' Home, an orphanage opened also in Gillis' honor.

The opera house went on a decline from 1890 onward, when the business center of Kansas City was moved down South. On June 25, 1925, the building was destroyed by a mysterious blast which killed 6 people, plus a firefighter who died on the way to the scene, and injured 31. The building was replaced with a two-story building which costed twice as much to build, which was named the Gillis Building, also in William Gillis' honor.
