= Elvira Wood =

Elvira Wood may refer to:

- Elvira Wood (paleontologist) (1865–1928), American paleontologist
- Elvira Wood (fencer) (born 1973), South African fencer
