= Troost =

Troost is a Dutch surname, and the word means "comfort" in Dutch.

== People ==
- Axel Troost (1954–2023), German politician
- Benoist Troost (1786–1859), Dutch-born physician, publisher, and community leader in Kansas City, Missouri.
  - Named after him: Troost Avenue, a major north–south street in Kansas City, Missouri
- Cornelis Troost (1697–1750), Dutch painter
- Gerard Troost (1776–1850), Dutch physician, naturalist and mineralogist who emigrated to the US in 1825.
  - Named after him: Troost's moccasin, Troostite
- Gerdy Troost (1904–2003), German architect, wife of Paul
- J. Maarten Troost (born 1969), Dutch travel writer living in the US
- Louis Joseph Troost (1825–1911), French chemist
- Paul Troost (1878–1934), German architect, husband of Gerdy
- Renee Troost (born 1988), Dutch footballer
- Sara Troost (1732–1803), Dutch painter
- Sjaak Troost (born 1959), Dutch footballer
- Willem Troost (1684–1752), Dutch painter
- William Troost-Ekong (born 1993), Nigerian-Dutch footballer
- Andre van Troost (born 1972), Dutch cricketer
- Luuk van Troost (born 1969), Dutch cricketer

== See also ==
- Trost (disambiguation)
