= William Gillis (businessman) =

American businessman, real estate developer and pioneer (1797–1869)

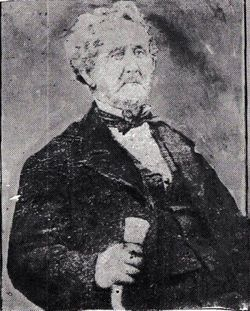
- Daguerreotype of Gillis
- Born: c. 1797; Somerset County, Maryland, US
- Died: July 18, 1869 (aged 71–72); Kansas City, Missouri, US
- Occupations: Fur trader, pioneer
- Known for: Founding member of Kansas City, Missouri
- Spouse(s): Wa-Wau-tiqua (m. 1820); Poquas (m. 1824); Kahketoqua (m. 1829)
- Family: Benoist Troost (nephew-in-law)
- Military career
- Allegiance: United States
- Conflicts: Battle of Tippecanoe; War of 1812

William Gillis (c. 1797 – July 18, 1869), sometimes spelled Gilliss, was an American fur trader, real estate developer and pioneer who was one of the original founders of Kansas City, Missouri.

== Biography ==
Gillis was born in Somerset County, Maryland c. 1797, to Thomas and Nelly Gillis (née Cannon). He ran away in 1806 at age 14 by ship and moved to Cincinnati. While there, he started a carpentry business and befriended William Henry Harrison.

Gillis served in the military, and fought in the Battle of Tippecanoe and the War of 1812. After the war, Gillis moved to Kaskaskia, Illinois with his brother and guardian, John. While there, he met Pierre Menard, ended his carpentry, and began trading fur. He was adopted into the Delaware Tribe of Indians in 1819. In 1820, he became the head of the Menard & Valle trading company, which he used to trade with other Native American tribes.

In the early 1830s, Gillis moved to Jackson County, Missouri and continued his trade with Native Americans. In 1838, he was one of the 14 original founders of the Town of Kansas, building the city's first hotel, the "Union Hotel", in 1848. In 1854, he helped fund the Kansas City Enterprise and the Kansas City Journal.

== Death and legacy ==
Gillis died on July 18, 1869, in Kansas City, Missouri. After his death, his $500,000 (~11 million in 2024) was inherited by his niece, Mary Ann, who married Benoist Troost, a Kansas City pioneer and friend of Gillis. A Missouri Supreme Court case was held by Kahketoqua, a native woman whom Gillis married in 1829, over her getting his inheritance money because of their marriage. She won the case, and was given one third of his inheritance. Other Native women he married, such as Wa-Wau-tiqua in 1820, and Poquas in 1824, also sued, but they did not win any money.

Mary Ann used her inheritance to build the Gillis Orphans' Home and the Gillis Opera House.
