= Kansas City Journal-Post =

Newspaper in Kansas City, Missouri (1854–1942)

The Kansas City Journal-Post was a newspaper in Kansas City, Missouri, from 1854 to 1942. It was the oldest newspaper in the city when it went out of business.

== History ==
It started as a weekly, The Kansas City Enterprise, on September 23, 1854, a year after the city's founding and shortly after The Public Ledger went out of business. Kansas City's first mayor, William S. Gregory, and future mayors Milton J. Payne and Elijah M. McGee, along with city fathers William Gillis, Benoist Troost, Thompson McDaniel, Robert Campbell and Kansas City's first bank and biggest store, Northrup & Chick, pooled $1,000 to start it.

William A. Strong was its first editor, and David K. Abeel the first publisher. It operated above a tavern at Main Street and the Missouri River in the River Market neighborhood.

In 1855, Strong enlisted another future mayor, Robert T. Van Horn, to take over the paper. Van Horn bought it for $250 and retained Abeel as publisher.

In 1857, it became The Western Journal of Commerce, and in 1858 it became The Kansas City Daily Western Journal of Commerce.

Before the American Civil War, the paper espoused the popular Missouri view that the status quo should be maintained, that Missouri should remain in the Union and remain a slave state. When the war began, Van Horn enlisted in the Union Army, and the paper became staunchly Republican.

In 1880, William Rockhill Nelson started The Kansas City Star, which became The Journal-Post's primary competitor.

In 1896, Van Horn sold the paper to Charles S. Gleed and Hal Gaylord, who renamed it The Kansas City Journal.

In 1909, Denver Post owners Frederick Gilmer Bonfils and Harry Heye Tammen bought The Post, with J. Ogden Armour as a silent partner. The Post, with its tabloid format, red headlines and yellow journalism was linked to the rise of the Tom Pendergast political machine.

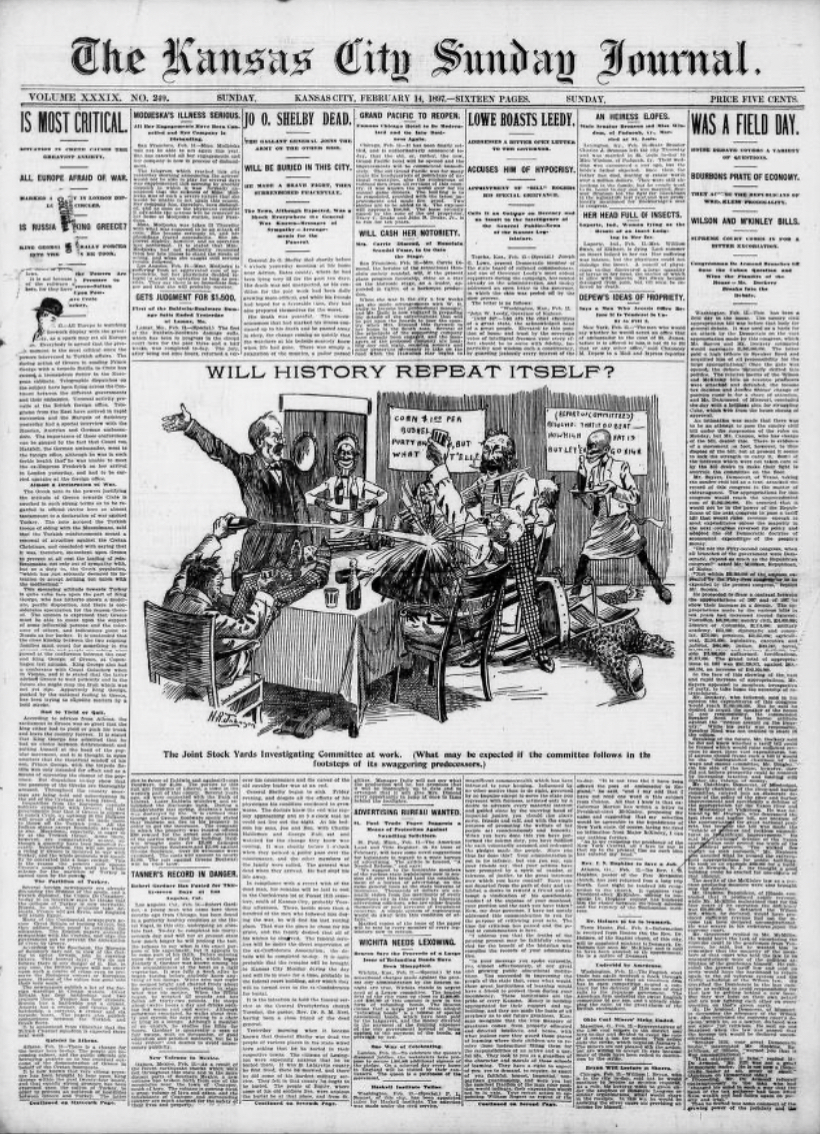
Front page of Kansas City Journal, February 14, 1897. Dickey bought the newspaper in 1938.

In 1922, Walter S. Dickey bought The Journal. He bought The Post in 1922 and combined their operations at 22nd and Oak. Dickey invested in the papers so as to compete with The Star, ultimately bankrupting his own lucrative clay-pipe manufacturing company. The papers combined as The Kansas City Journal-Post on October 4, 1928.

In 1938, with the beginning of the collapse of the Pendergast machine, the paper changed the name of The Post to The Kansas City Journal. Also in 1938 Journal photographer Jack Wally bylined an undercover photo exposé of gambling houses under Pendergast that ran in Life magazine.

The paper's last publication was on March 31, 1942. It had been the last daily competition to The Star.
