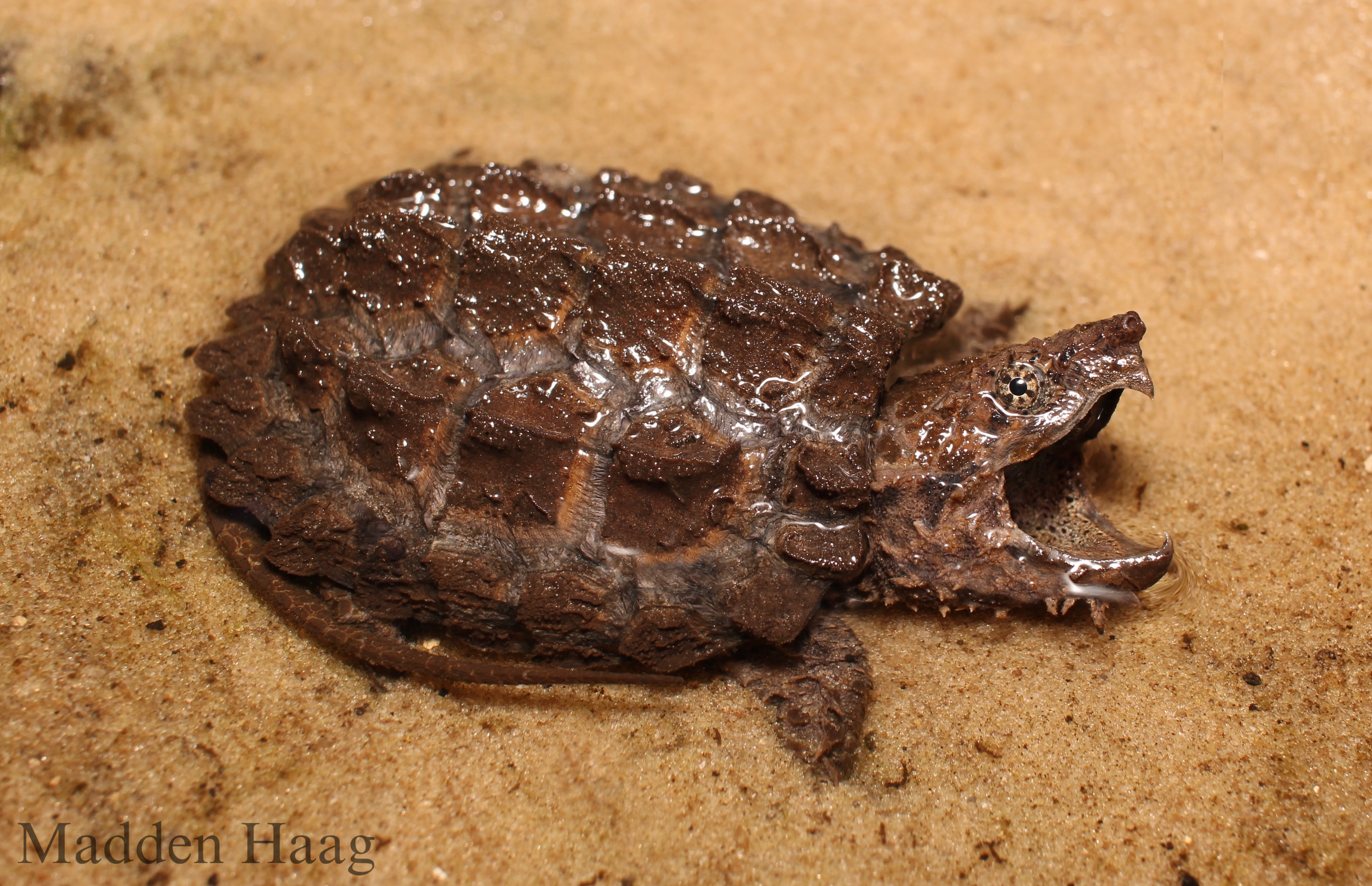

Conservation status
- Vulnerable (IUCN 3.1)

- Threatened (ESA)

Scientific classification
- Kingdom: Animalia
- Phylum: Chordata
- Class: Reptilia
- Order: Testudines
- Suborder: Cryptodira
- Family: Chelydridae
- Genus: Macrochelys
- Species: M. suwanniensis

Binomial name
- Macrochelys suwanniensis Thomas et al., 2014

Synonyms
- Macrochelys suwannensis Thomas et al., 2014 (Missp.)

= Suwannee alligator snapping turtle =

Species of turtle

The Suwannee alligator snapping turtle (Macrochelys suwanniensis) is a large species of turtle in the family Chelydridae. This species is endemic to the Southeastern United States, where it only inhabits the Suwannee River basin.

== Taxonomy ==
It is one of only two known species in the genus Macrochelys, the other being the far more widespread alligator snapping turtle (M. temminckii); a third, the Apalachicola snapping turtle (M. apalachicolae), which was described alongside M. suwanniensis, is not thought to be distinct from M. temminckii and has been synonymized with it. It was previously believed to represent a population of M. temminckii, but a 2014 study found significant genetic divergence between the Suwannee population and M. temminckii, dating back to the late Miocene to early Pliocene, about 5.5 to 13.4 million years ago, thus the Suwannee population was described as a distinct species, M. suwanniensis.

== Distribution and habitat ==
This species is only found in the Suwannee River basin, in southern Georgia and northern portions of peninsular Florida; it is allopatric with respect to M. temminckii, which inhabits river basins further to the west. It inhabits only riparian habitats such as rivers and their tributaries, but sometimes uses backwater swamps and oxbow lakes. Individuals found in inland lakes have likely been introduced. In 2021, an individual was discovered within the Okefenokee Swamp, indicating that a previously undocumented population of these turtles may inhabit the swamp. Around 2,000 Suwanee alligator snapping turtles are believed to remain in the wild as of 2022, and the species still occupies much of its known historical range.

== Size ==
This species appears to exhibit sexual dimorphism, with males tending to be larger than females. In samples from six distinct ecological reaches running downstream between White Springs and Suwannee Estuary, mature females were found to have a straight-midline carapace length between 351 and 550 mm, while mature males had a straight-midline carapace length between 451 and 650 mm. Males found had an average straight-midline carapace of 552 ± 7.1 mm, carapace width of 458 ± 5.2 mm, plastron length of 400 ± 4.2 mm, head width of 177 ± 2.3 mm, tail length of 330 ± 4.1 mm, and mass of 38.0 ± 1.2 kg. In comparison, females had an average straight-midline carapace of 416 ± 7.5 mm, carapace width of 358 ± 6.7 mm, plastron length of 313 ± 6.3 mm, head width of 134 ± 3.7 mm, tail length of 292 ± 6.6 mm, and mass of 16.6 ± 0.8 kg. Environment appears to play a large role in size determination, as each ecological niche has various implications on average size and mass.

== Threats ==
Due to its slow generation time, Suwanee alligator snapping turtles are highly vulnerable to direct stressors such as turtle hunting (illegal in Florida) and indirect stressors such as habitat destruction. They are additionally at risk from ingesting discarded fishing tackle, baited hooks left on trotlines, and capture of juveniles in abandoned hoop nets used for baitfish or catfish fishing. They may experience mortality as bycatch during recreational and commercial freshwater fishing. In 2021, the U.S. Fish and Wildlife Service proposed listing the species under the Endangered Species Act of 1973. Effective July 29, 2024, the species gained protection as a threatened species under that act. In March 2025, the Suwannee alligator snapping turtle was classified as vulnerable by the IUCN, which noted its decreasing population.
