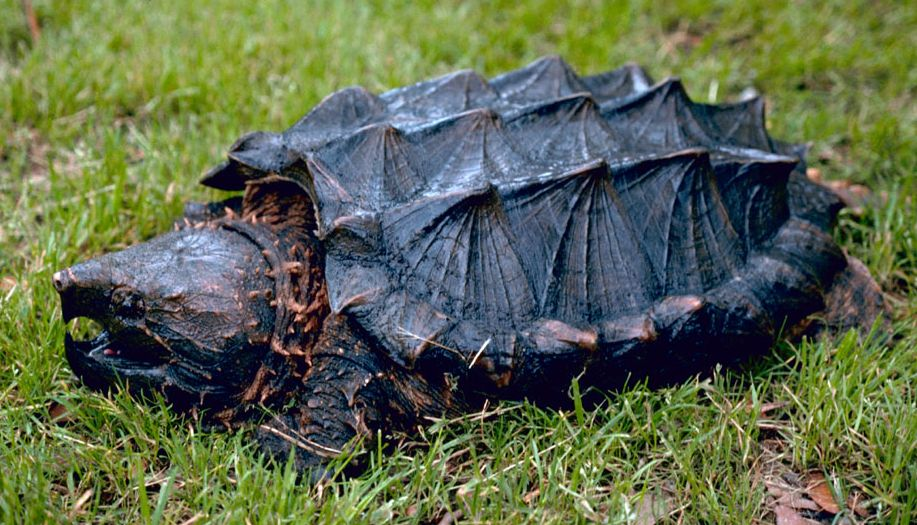

Conservation status
- Endangered (IUCN 3.1)
- CITES Appendix II

Scientific classification
- Kingdom: Animalia
- Phylum: Chordata
- Class: Reptilia
- Order: Testudines
- Suborder: Cryptodira
- Family: Chelydridae
- Genus: Macrochelys
- Species: M. temminckii

Binomial name
- Macrochelys temminckii (Troost, 1835)

Synonyms
- List: Testudo planitia Gmelin, 1789 (nomen suppressum); Chersine planitia — Merrem, 1820; Chelonura temminckii Troost in Harlan, 1835 (nomen conservandum); Emysaurus temminckii — A.M.C. Duméril and Bibron in A.M.C. Duméril & A.H.A. Duméril, 1851; Macroclemys temminckii — Gray, 1846; Cheldyra temminckii — Agassiz, 1857; Gypochelys temminckii — Agassiz, 1857; Macroclemmys temminckii — Strauch, 1862; Macroclemys temmincki — Pritchard, 1967

= Alligator snapping turtle =

Species of turtle

The alligator snapping turtle (Macrochelys temminckii) is a large species of turtle in the family Chelydridae. They are the largest freshwater turtle in North America. The species is endemic to freshwater habitats in the United States. M. temminckii is one of the heaviest living freshwater turtles in the world. It is often associated with, but not closely related to, the common snapping turtle, which is in the genus Chelydra. The specific epithet temminckii is in honor of Dutch zoologist Coenraad Jacob Temminck.

== Taxonomy ==
Although it was once believed that only one extant species exists in the genus Macrochelys, recent studies have shown that there are two species, the other being the Suwannee snapping turtle (M. suwanniensis) of the Suwannee River. The most recent common ancestor (MRCA) of the two species lived approximately 3.2 to 8.9 million years ago, during the late Miocene to late Pliocene. A third species, the Apalachicola snapping turtle (M. apalachicolae), has been proposed, but is generally not recognized.

The alligator snapping turtle is given its common name because of its immensely powerful jaws and distinct ridges on its shell that are similar in appearance to the rough, ridged skin of an alligator. It is also slightly less commonly known as "the loggerhead snapper" (not to be confused with the loggerhead sea turtle or loggerhead musk turtle).

== Distribution and habitat ==
The alligator snapping turtle is found primarily in freshwaters of the southeastern United States. It is found from the Florida Panhandle west to East Texas, north to southeastern Kansas, Missouri, southeastern Iowa, western Illinois, southern Indiana,western Kentucky, Louisiana, and western Tennessee.

Macrochelys temminckii often utilize core sites, characterized by specific microhabitat features such as an abundance of structural cover such as cut banks, root balls, and submerged trees and dense canopy cover. Typically, only nesting females venture onto open land.

They are generally found only in bodies of water that flow into the Gulf of Mexico and usually do not occur in isolated wetlands or ponds. A study found that the turtles prefer places with canopy cover, overhanging trees, shrubs, dead submerged trees, and beaver dens. This species utilizes core sites within these habitats, and females tend to have larger movement patterns than males. The average home range for an individual is 750 m (2,460 ft). Females have larger home ranges than males.

== Description ==
The alligator snapping turtle is characterized by a large, heavy head, and a long, thick shell with three dorsal ridges of large scales (osteoderms), giving it an appearance reminiscent of the armoured ankylosaurs. It can be immediately distinguished from the common snapping turtle by the three distinct rows of spikes and raised plates on the carapace, whereas the common snapping turtle has a smoother carapace. The spikes on the carapace gradually flatten out as the turtle ages. M. temminckii is a solid gray, brown, black, or olive-green in color, and often covered with algae. It has radiating yellow patterns around the eyes, serving to break up the outline of the eyes to keep the turtle camouflaged. The eyes are also surrounded by a star-shaped arrangement of fleshy, filamentous "eyelashes".

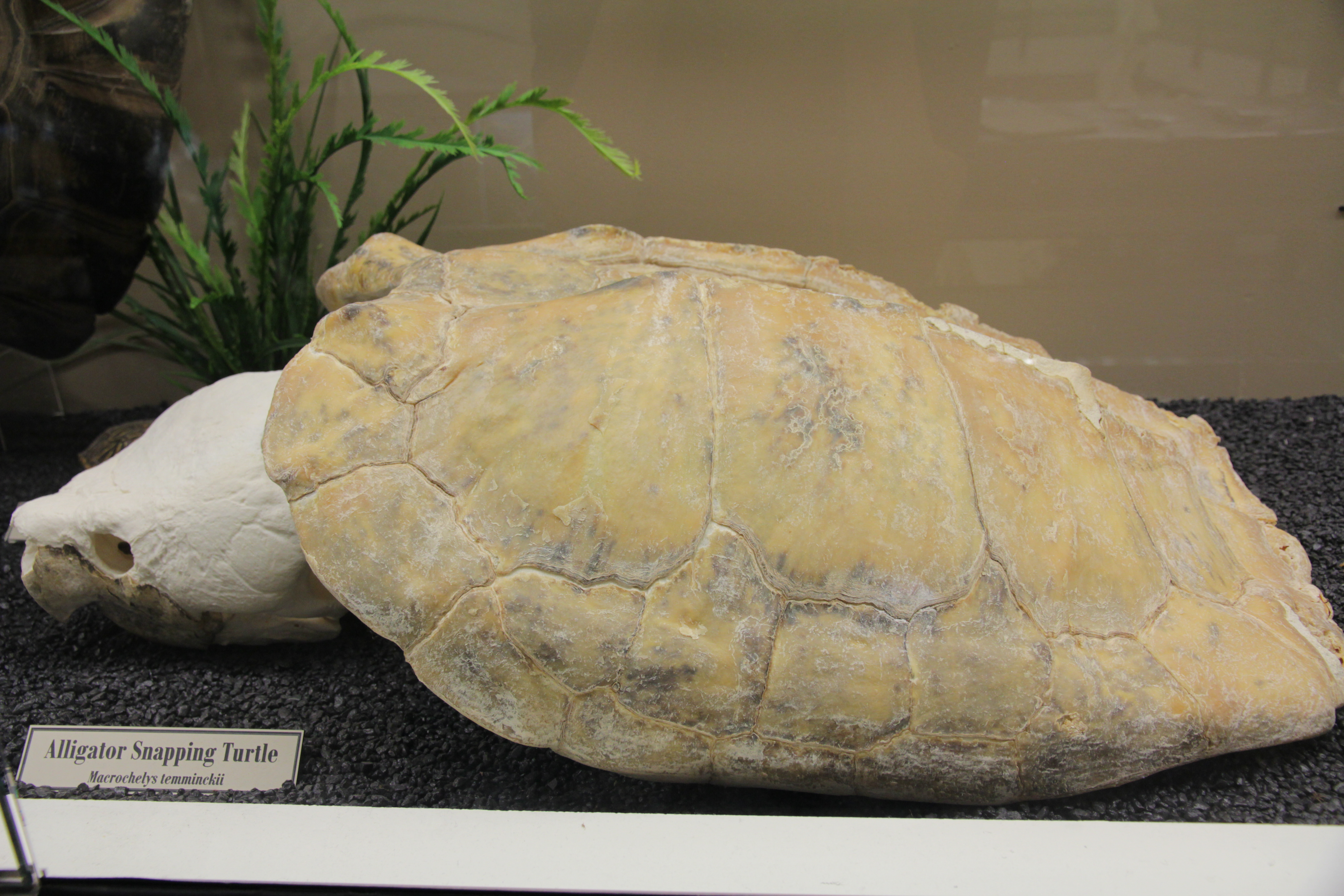
Skeleton, at the Museum of Osteology.

Using its vermiform appendage to lure prey (aggressive mimicry).

Though not verified, a 183 kg (403 lb) alligator snapping turtle was found in Kansas in 1937, but the largest verifiable one is debatable. One weighed at the Shedd Aquarium in Chicago was a 16-year resident giant alligator snapper weighing 113 kg (249 lb), sent to the Tennessee Aquarium as part of a breeding loan in 1999, where it subsequently died. Another weighing 107 kg (236 lb) was housed at the Brookfield Zoo in suburban Chicago. Another large turtle reportedly weighed 135 kg (298 lb). The species generally does not grow quite that large. Breeding maturity is attained around 8 kg (18 lb), when the straight carapace length is around 33 cm (13 in), but then the species continues to grow throughout life. Excluding exceptionally large specimens, adult alligator snapping turtles generally range in carapace length from 35 to 80.8 cm (13.8 to 31.8 in) and weigh from 8.4 to 80 kg (19 to 176 lb). Males are typically larger than females. 88 adult alligator snapping turtles averaged 21.05 kg (46.4 lb), 92 averaged 19.72 kg (43.5 lb), and 249 averaged 13.5 kg (30 lb). Usually very old males comprise the specimens that weigh in excess of 45 kg (99 lb) per most population studies. Among extant freshwater turtles, only the little-known giant softshell turtles of the genera Chitra, Rafetus, and Pelochelys, native to Asia, reach comparable sizes.

In mature specimens, those with a straight carapace length over 30 cm (12 in), males and females can be differentiated by the position of the cloaca from the carapace, and by the thickness of the base of the tail. A mature male's cloaca extends beyond the carapace edge, a female's is placed exactly on the edge if not nearer to the plastron. The base of the tail of the male is also thicker as compared to that of the female because of the hidden reproductive organs.

The inside of the turtle's mouth is camouflaged, and it possesses a vermiform (worm-shaped) appendage on the tip of its tongue used to lure fish, a form of aggressive mimicry. With its unique head morphology, research suggests that this species has strong natural selection for bite performance, which can directly or indirectly affect fitness. A study conducted in 2023 found that this turtle's bite force can range between 8.2 and 1872 Newtons of force. This bite force is heavily dependent on size. Research suggests that M.temminckii thermoregulates by altering its depth in the water column, because this species is rarely seen basking.

This turtle must be handled with extreme care and considered potentially dangerous. This species can bite through the handle of a broom and in rare cases human fingers have been cleanly bitten off by the species. No human deaths have been reported to have been caused by the alligator snapping turtle.

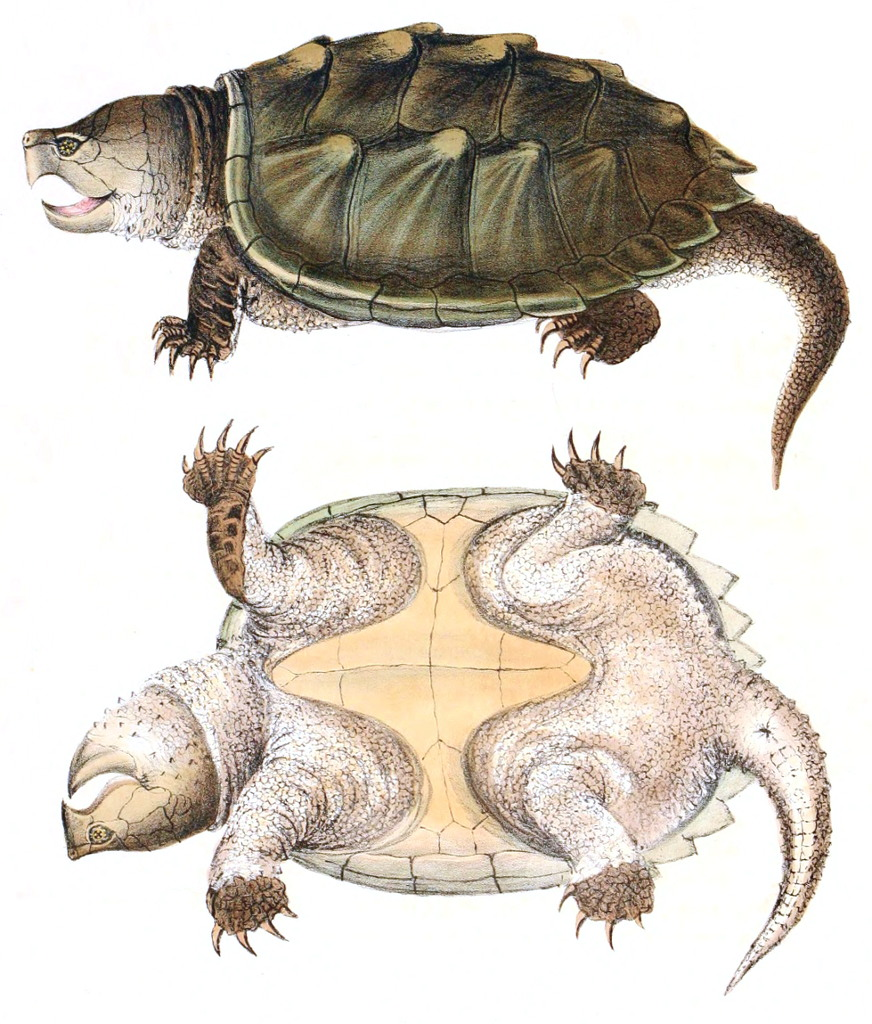
Illustration from Holbrook's North American Herpetology, 1842

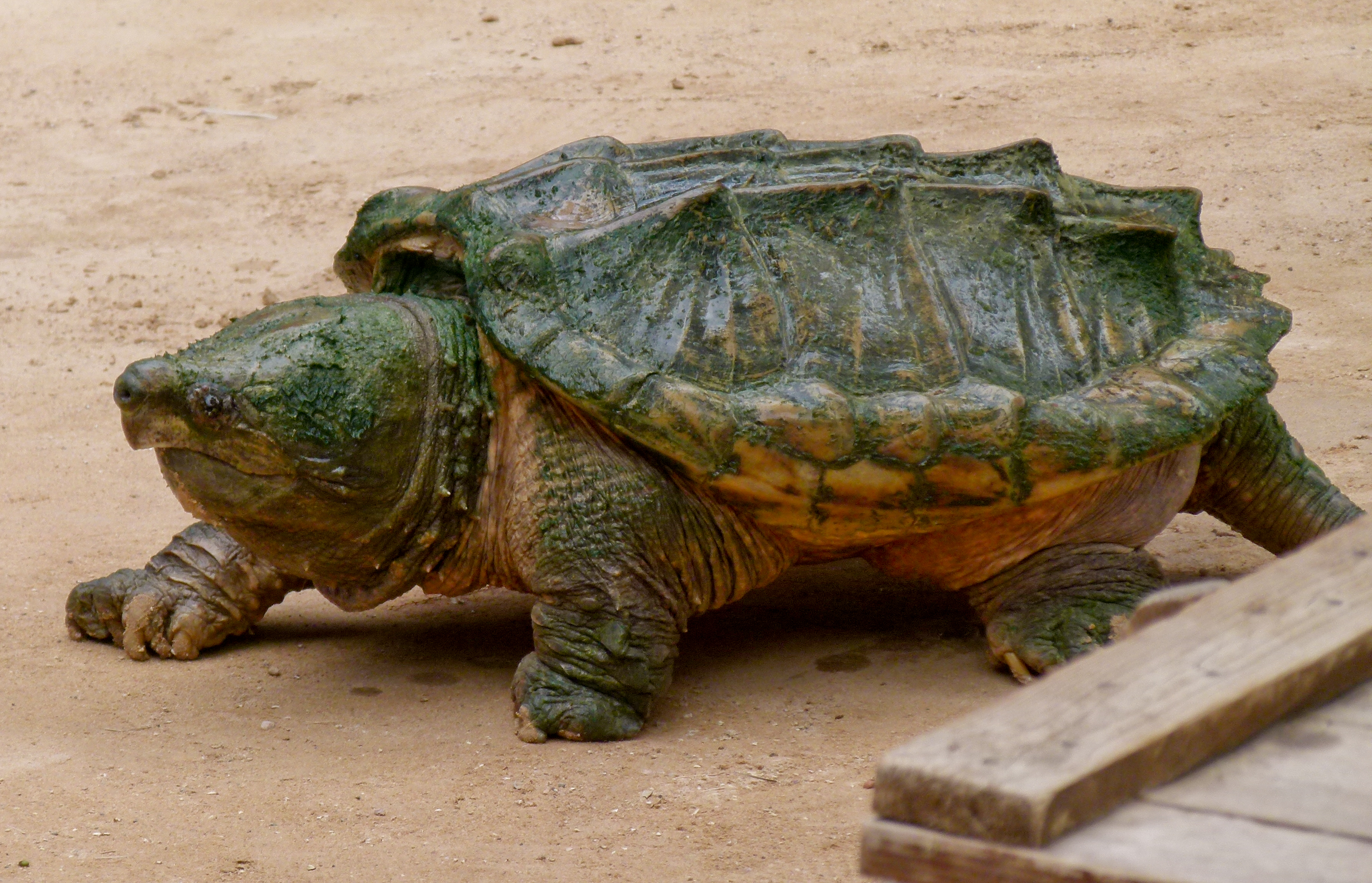
With a carpet of algae on the carapace

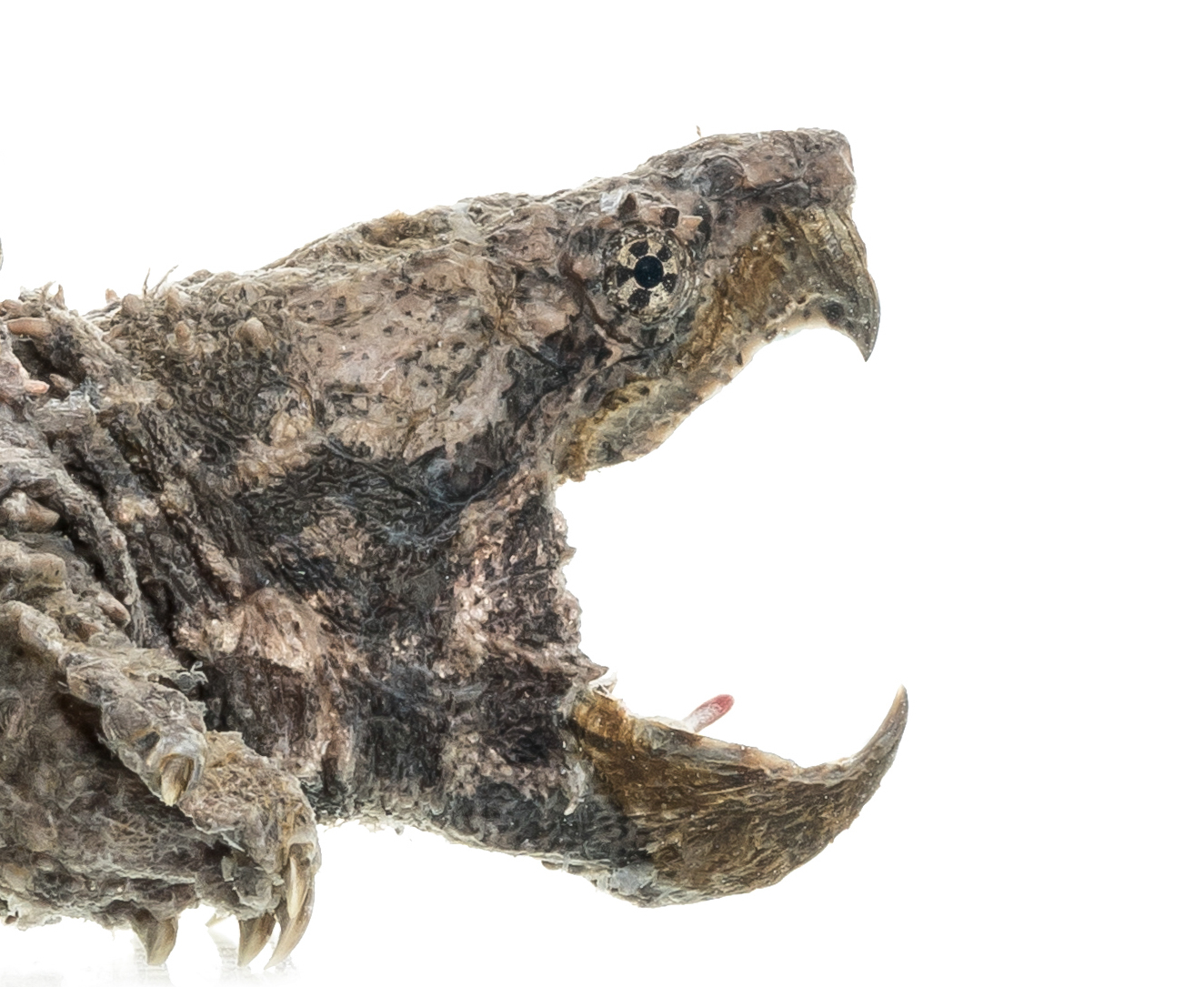
Head of a juvenile

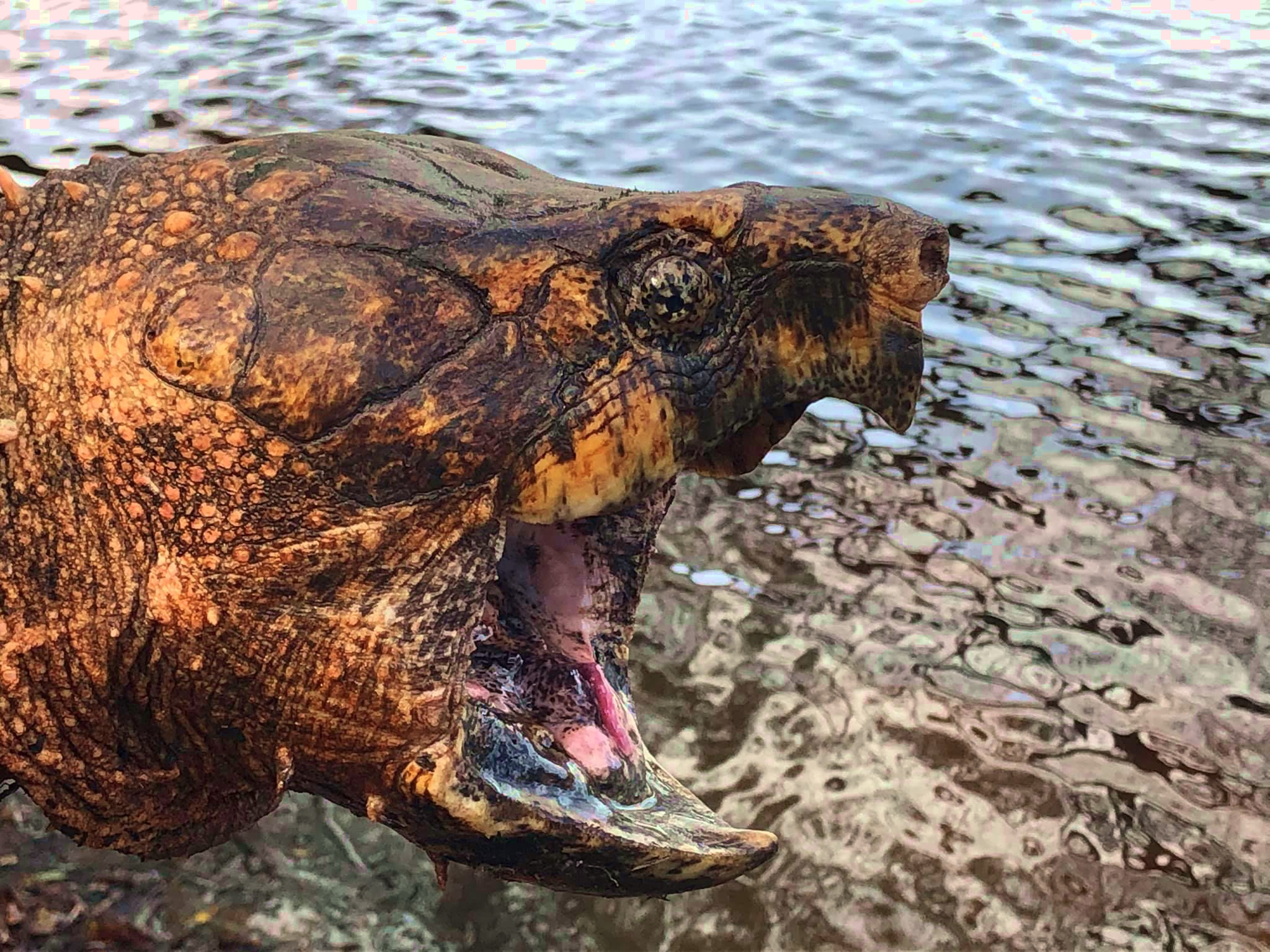
Head of an adult

== Diet ==
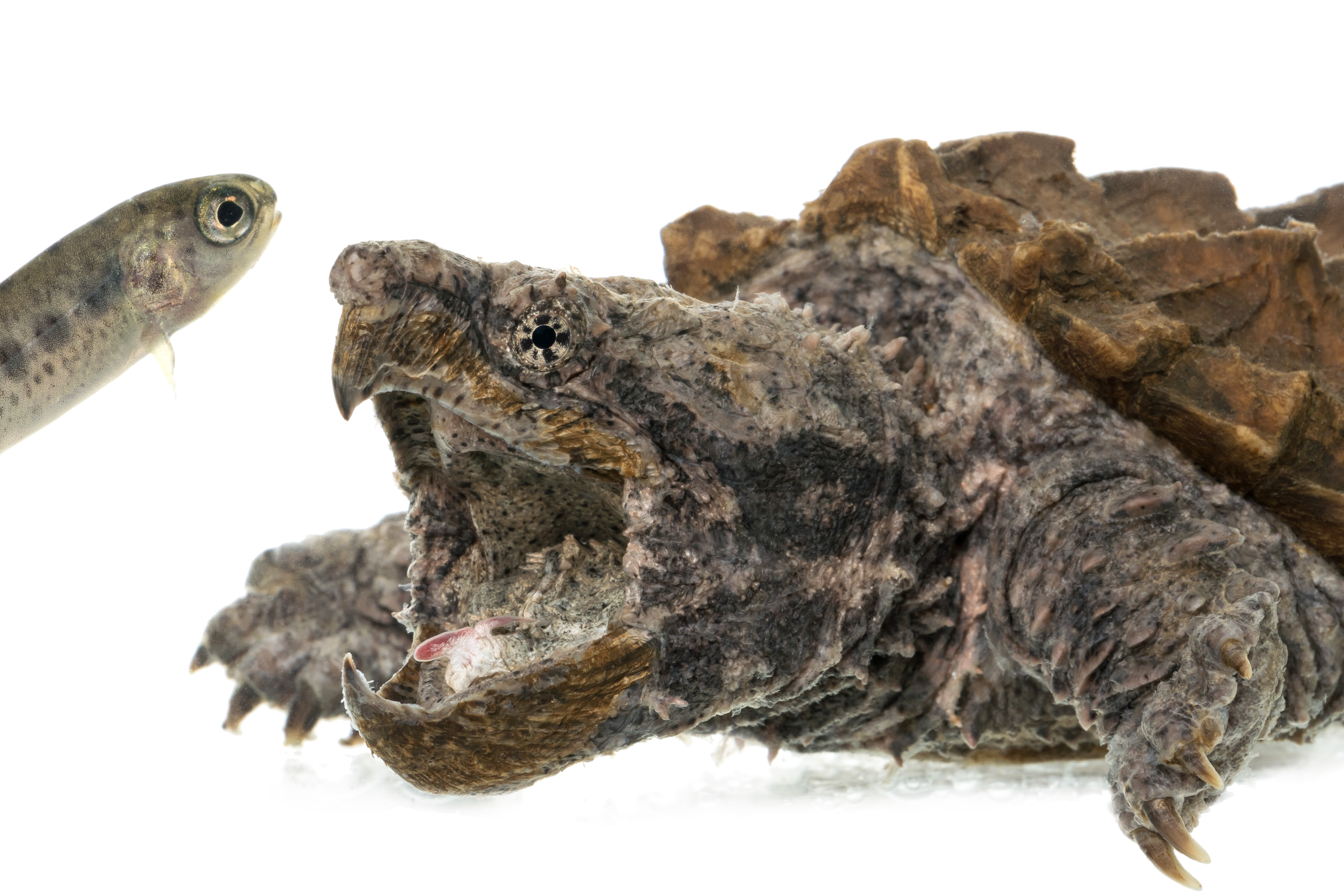
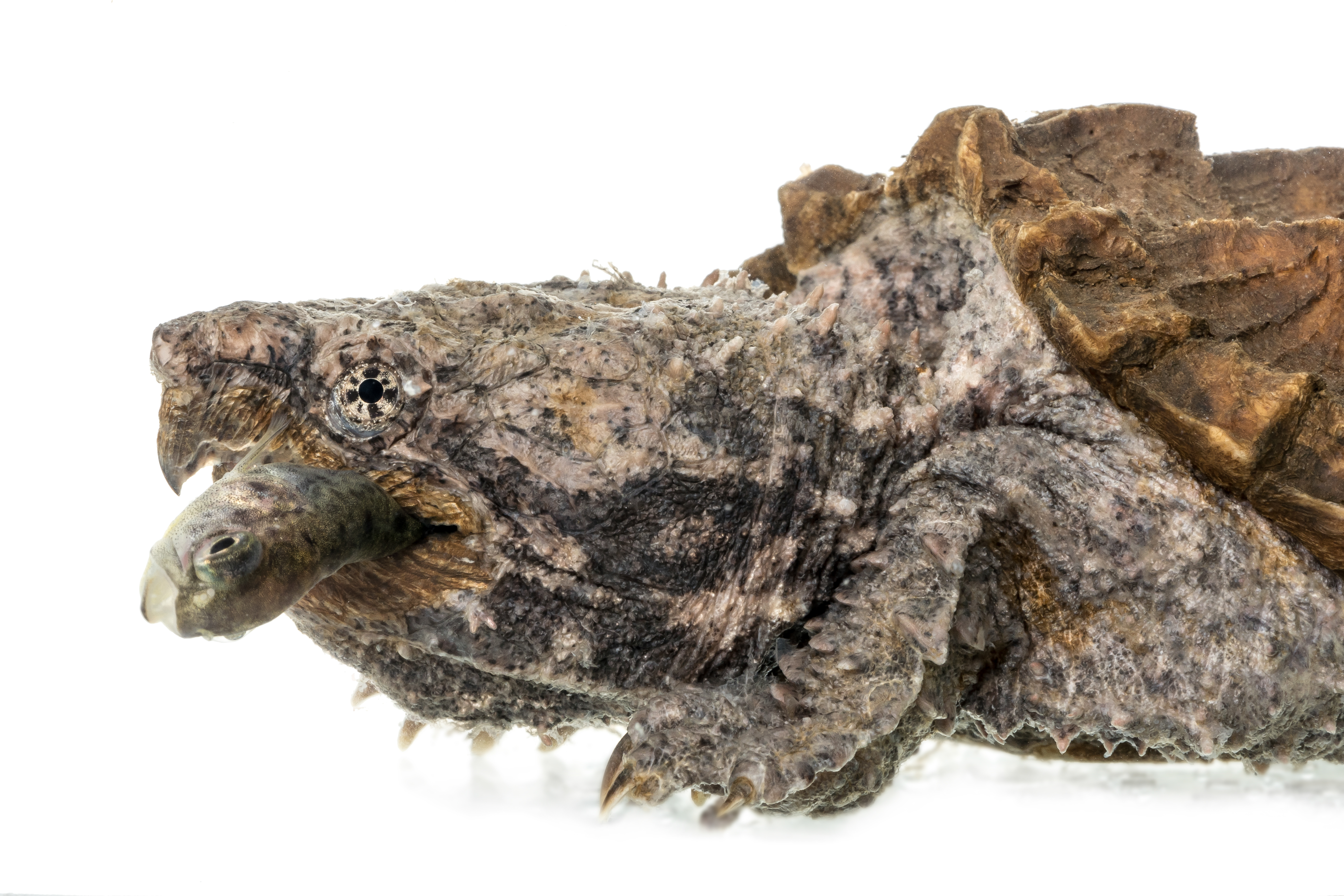
Juvenile preying on a fish

The alligator snapping turtle is an opportunistic feeder that is almost entirely carnivorous. It relies on both catching live food and scavenging dead organisms. In general, it will eat almost anything it can catch. Fishermen have glorified the species' ability to catch fish and to deplete fish populations, whereas in fact it largely targets any abundant and easily caught prey, and rarely has any extensive deleterious effect on fish populations. Its natural diet consists primarily of fish and fish carcasses, mollusks, carrion, and amphibians, but it is also known to eat snakes, snails, worms and other invertebrates, crayfish, insects, water birds, aquatic plants, other turtles and sometimes even small alligators. In one study conducted in Louisiana, 79.8% of the stomach contents of adult alligator snapping turtles was found to be composed of other turtles, although the resistance of shell and reptile-bone fragments to digestion may have led these fragments to remain longer in the digestive tract than other items. This species may also, on occasion, prey on aquatic rodents, including nutrias and muskrats or even snatch small to mid-sized other mammals, including squirrels, mice, Virginia opossums, raccoons, and Mexican long-nosed armadillos when they attempt to swim or come near the water's edge.

In the wild, alligator snapping turtles are also recorded eating a wide range of plant matter such as seeds, tubers, stalks, American persimmons, wild grape, water hickory, pecans, and locust. Between March and October, stomach samples of 65 turtles showed that 56% of their diet by volume was composed of acorns of water, overcup, and willow oaks. The most frequently eaten food item was fish; despite this, fish only made up 7% of their diet by volume. Mammalian and bird prey, although less frequently eaten, made up 10% and 7% of the diet by volume respectively. As ingested willow oak acorns were found to germinate faster after defecation, it is suggested that alligator snapping turtles may be important seed dispersers of oak trees. While downstream dispersal of acorns is passive, ingestion by alligator snapping turtles could facilitate dispersal of acorns upstream as well as laterally across streams.

The alligator snapping turtle seemingly most often hunts at night. It may also hunt diurnally, however. By day, it may try to attract fish and other prey by sitting quietly at the bottom of murky water and letting its jaws hang open to reveal its tongue appendage, which looks like a small, pink worm in the back of its gray mouth, and lure the prey into striking distance. The vermiform tongue imitates the movements of a worm, luring prey to the turtle's mouth. The mouth is then closed with tremendous speed and force, completing the ambush. Although the turtle does not actively hunt its prey, it can detect chemosensory cues from prey, like the mud turtle, in order to choose the location in which it is most likely to catch food. Small fish, such as minnows, are often caught in this way by younger alligator snapping turtles, whereas adults must eat a greater quantity per day and must forage more actively. Though not a regular food source for them, adult alligator snappers have even been known to kill and eat small American alligators.

== Reproduction and lifespan ==
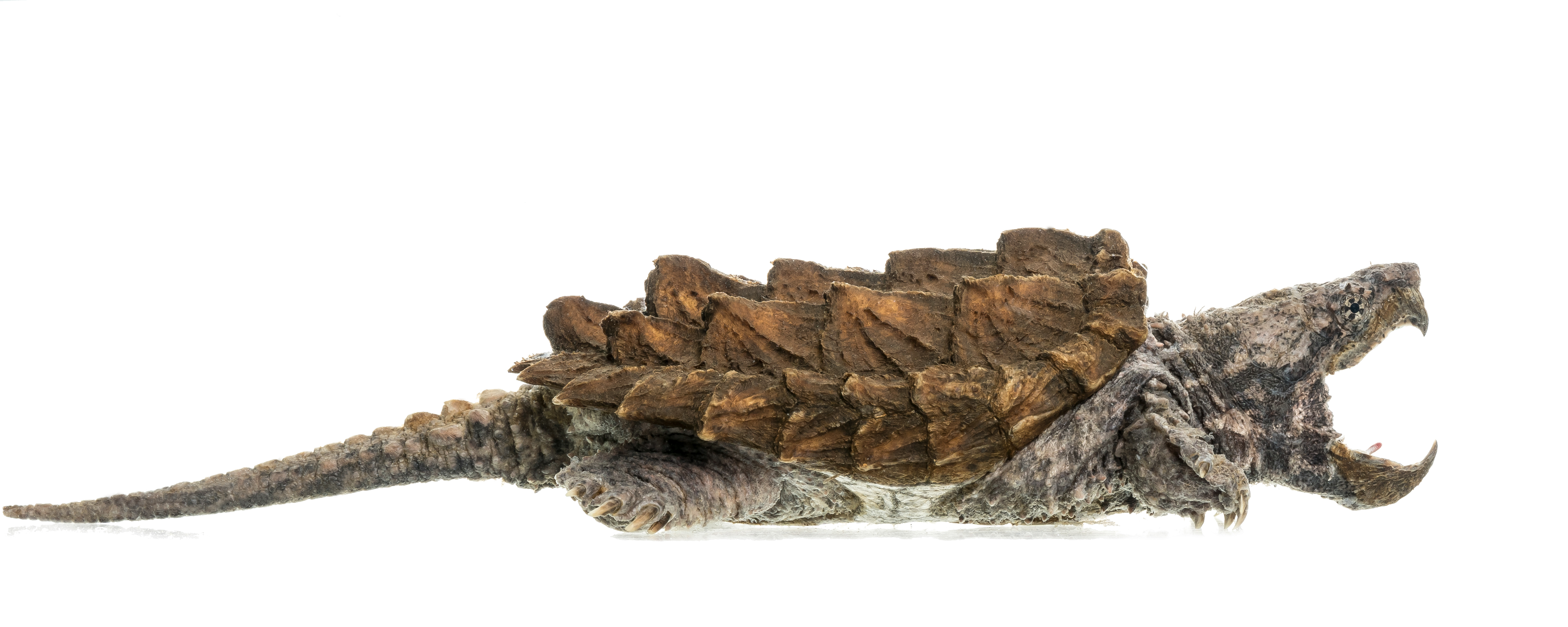
Juvenile

Maturity is reached around 12 years of age. Mating takes place yearly, in early spring in the southern part of its geographic range, and in later spring in the northern part. About two months later, the female builds a nest and lays a clutch of 10–50 eggs. It was found that some females lay eggs every year and some females lay eggs every other year. The sex of the young depends on the temperature at which the eggs are incubated. This is called temperature dependent sex determination, and it is used by all turtle species to determine sex. For the alligator snapping turtle, higher temperatures produce more males in a clutch. Nests are typically excavated at least 50 yards from the water's edge to prevent them from being flooded and drowned. Incubation takes from 100 to 140 days, and hatchlings emerge in the early fall.

Though its potential lifespan in the wild is unknown, the alligator snapping turtle is believed to be capable of living to 200 years of age, but 80 to 120 is more likely. In captivity, it typically lives between 20 and 70 years.

== Predation ==
The alligator snapping turtle is most vulnerable to predators before and shortly after hatching. The eggs can be eaten by birds or mammals. The risk of predation decreases as the turtle gets bigger, so the adult turtle does not have as many predators. Their largest predator in many parts of their range is the northern river otter (Lontra canadensis) when the turtles are young.

Humans are also a threat to the alligator snapping turtle. Populations in the US are at historic lows. This is mainly due to harvesting the turtles for their meat. US harvest rates have increased 209% since 1998. Even farmed turtle populations may be restocked from wild populations. There is also harvest minimum limits but no harvest maximums, meaning that the larger adults may be removed from populations.

== Under human care ==
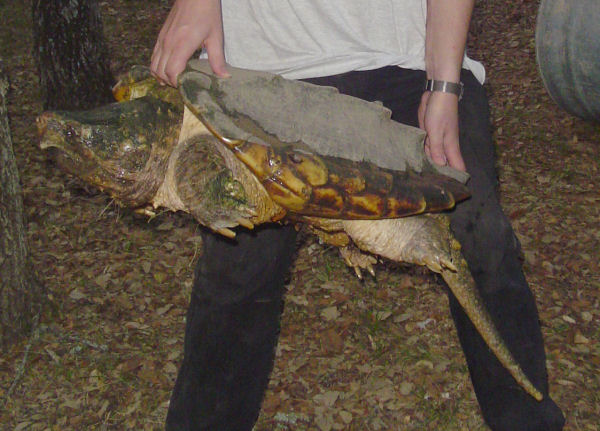
Correct handling of a 45 lb (20 kg) alligator snapping turtle at Austin Reptile Service, in Austin, Texas

The alligator snapping turtle is sometimes captive-bred as a pet and is readily available in the exotic animal trade. Due to its potential size and specific needs, it only makes a good pet for experienced aquatic turtle keepers.

It prefers to feed on live fish, but will readily feed on other types of meat or leafy vegetables if offered. Hand feeding is dangerous. Extreme temperatures are known to affect the turtle's appetite and would result in the turtle refusing to feed until the temperature has been regulated.

Due to the turtle's sheer size, handling an adult specimen poses significant problems. With relative safety, a smaller turtle is held by the sides of its shell. A larger turtle, with its proportionately longer neck and greater reach, is held safely by grasping the shells just behind the head with one hand and using the other hand to grasp the shell just above the tail's base.

Despite its reputation, the alligator snapping turtle is typically not prone to biting. However, if provoked, it is quite capable of delivering a powerful bite which can easily amputate fingers or cause other significant injuries, such as cuts. In some U.S. states, where the alligator snapping turtle does not naturally occur (such as California), it is prohibited from being kept as a pet by residents.

== Invasive species ==
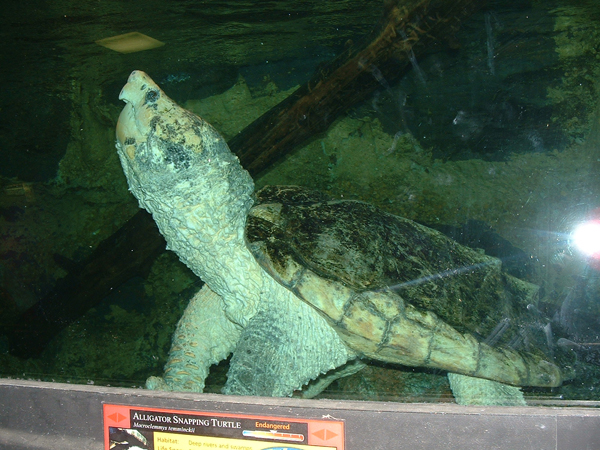
In Zoo Atlanta

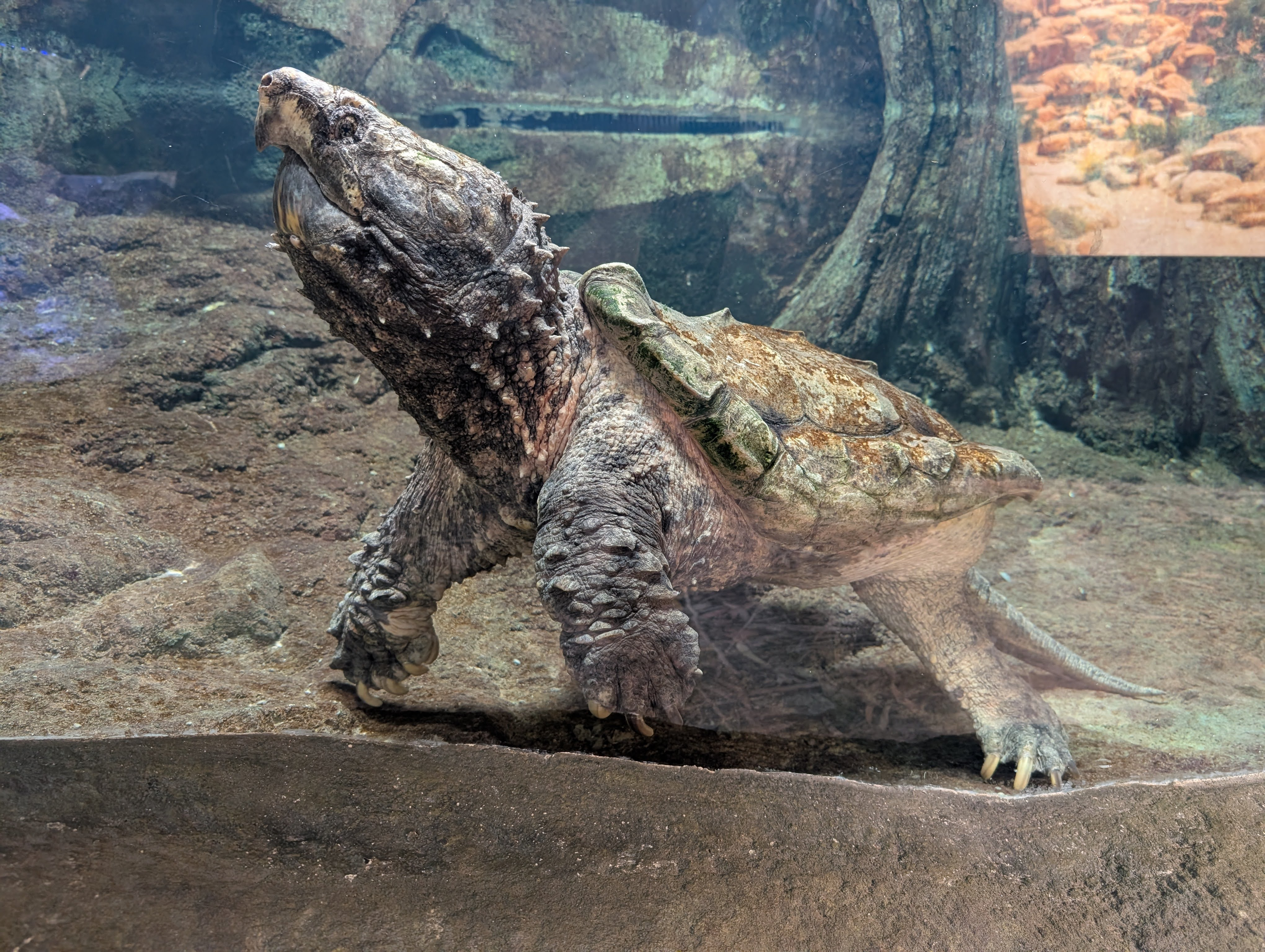
At Taronga ZOO, Sydney, Australia

Some alligator snapping turtles were released or escaped into waters of the Czech Republic, Germany and Hungary. In Bavaria, a turtle was accused of causing injury to a child, but the claim was never substantiated and the turtle in question was never found. In Bohemia, four turtles of this species have been caught. In Hungary, one turtle was caught in the middle of a street near a lake. Alligator snapping turtles have been found throughout Italy beginning in the early 2000s. As a result of released pets, alligator snapping turtles are considered an invasive species in Italy. They are considered a threat to pond biodiversity and to human health (due to their ability to carry leptospirosis). Certain EU countries have strong laws against keeping the alligator snapping turtle without permission, as it is an invasive species.

In February 2024, a single male was found in Urswick Tarn in Cumbria, England. The turtle, which was nicknamed 'Fluffy' by his rescuers, has since been moved to the National Centre for Reptile Welfare in Kent.

There are non-native established invasive populations of the alligator snapping turtle in South Africa.

== Conservation status ==
Because of collection for the exotic pet trade, overharvesting for its meat, and habitat destruction, some states have imposed bans on collecting the alligator snapping turtle from the wild. The IUCN lists it as an endangered species, and as of 23 February 2023, it was listed as a CITES Appendix II species, meaning international trade (including in parts and derivatives) is regulated by the CITES permit system.

The alligator snapping turtle is now endangered in several states, including Indiana, Illinois, Kentucky, and Missouri, where it is protected by state law. It is designated as "in need of conservation" in Kansas.

In October 2013, one was found in the Prineville Reservoir in Oregon. It was captured and euthanized by the Oregon Department of Fish and Wildlife, which considers alligator snapping turtles to be an invasive species. This one was the first found in the state.

In June 2024, it was announced captive alligator snapping turtles, bred in Oklahoma, would be reintroduced to the Neosho River in Kansas in hopes of bringing them back to its waterways.
