= Trost =

Trost may refer to:

== People ==
- Al Trost, United States soccer midfielder
- Barry Trost, American chemist
- Brad Trost, Canadian Member of Parliament
- Carlisle Trost, United States Navy officer
- Dolfi Trost, Romanian surrealist
- Katharina Trost, German track and field athlete
- Keagen Trost (born 2001), American football player
- René Trost, Dutch football defender
- Tobias Heinrich Gottfried Trost, German organ builder
- Tom Trost, American politician

== Other ==
- Danish ship Trost, a vessel of the Dano-Norwegian Navy which acted as the flagship for Christian IV's expeditions to Greenland
- Trost & Trost, an architectural firm
- Trost asymmetric allylic alkylation, a chemical reaction developed by Barry Trost
- Trost ligand, a chemical ligand designed by Barry Trost
- Trost ("Consolation"), a piano piece by composer Juan María Solare
- Trost Records, an Austrian record label located in Vienna

== See also ==
- Troost
