= Benoist Troost =

Dutch geologist, physician, and pioneer (1786–1859)

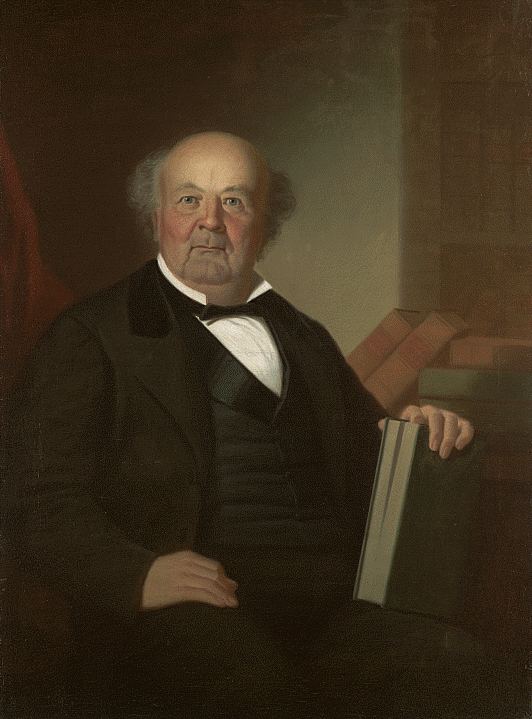
- 1859 George Caleb Bingham portrait of Troost
- Born: Benedictus Troost; November 17, 1786 's-Hertogenbosch, Noord-Brabant, Netherlands
- Died: February 8, 1859 (aged 72); Kansas City, Missouri, US
- Other names: Benoît Troost; Benoit Troost
- Occupations: Geologist; pioneer; physician
- Known for: Cofounder of Town of Kansas
- Family: Gerard Troost (brother); William Gillis (uncle-in-law)

Benoist Troost (born Benedictus Troost; also Benoît Troost, Benoit Troost; November 17, 1786 – February 8, 1859) was an Americanized Dutch geologist, medical doctor, and American pioneer. He was one of the 14 founders of the American frontier town of Kansas, Missouri which became Kansas City, Missouri, with its namesake street Troost Avenue.

== Early and personal life ==
Benoist Troost was born to Catholics Everardus Josephus Troost and Anna Cornelia van Heeck on November 17, 1786, in 's-Hertogenbosch. He was the younger brother of Gerard Troost.

In 1813, Troost married Rachel Tage, the sister of his brother's wife, Margaret.

== Career ==
From July 1807 to March 1810, while living in Paris as a scholar of the National Museum of Natural History, he was employed by Louis Bonaparte to oversee his mineral collection. Though with historically uncertain medical credentials, he was reputedly a medical steward in Napoleon's army.

In 1816, Troost took a geological trip to New Jersey organized by William Maclure, and remained in America. In the mid-1820s, he and his older brother, Gerard, mapped the geology of Philadelphia and the land of the American frontier. They owned a successful lead works in Pittsburgh. He moved progressively toward the western American frontier, to St. Louis and then Independence, Missouri, around 1844 and 1845.

Troost moved to the frontier village variously called West Port Landing or Kansas, and became its first resident physician. In 1846, he married Mary Ann Troost, the niece of his friend and fellow pioneer William Gillis. That year, he bought five lots of land as one of the 14 co-founders of the Town of Kansas Company. From 1849 to 1850, at the peak of the California gold rush, he and Gillis built the village's first hotel on the river levee, named Troost House and later renamed Gillis House. It was called the "finest building in the city", and later the "free state hotel" due to the slavery-driven border wars called Bleeding Kansas.

He was listed as a trustee when Kansas, Missouri was finally legally incorporated as a town by Jackson County in 1850. He was a trustee again when the Missouri General Assembly reincorporated and renamed it as the City of Kansas in 1853. He and William S. Gregory entered the election as the first mayor, and Gregory won.

In 1854, he founded the Kansas City Enterprise newspaper. In 1857, he incorporated the city's first Chamber of Commerce. He died on February 8, 1859, in William Gillis's mansion in Kansas City, Missouri.

== Legacy ==
Benoist Troost is the namesake for Troost Avenue, Troost Park, and Troost Lake Park in Kansas City.
