= National Centre for Reptile Welfare =

British animal welfare organization

The National Centre for Reptile Welfare is a British animal welfare organization specializing in reptiles and amphibians. A joint initiative by The Pet Charity (TPC) and the Reptile and Exotic Pet Trade Association (REPTA), it was established at Hadlow College in August 2018 in Kent, England. Amongst other affairs, it takes care of escaped exotic herpetological pets and those pets whose owners for whatever reason can no longer care for them, and secures and records stowaways (some of which are venomous) found in packaging from overseas; it also has citizen science educational and research arms.
