= Gillis Orphans' Home =

Historic orphanage in Missouri, US

- U.S. National Register of Historic Places
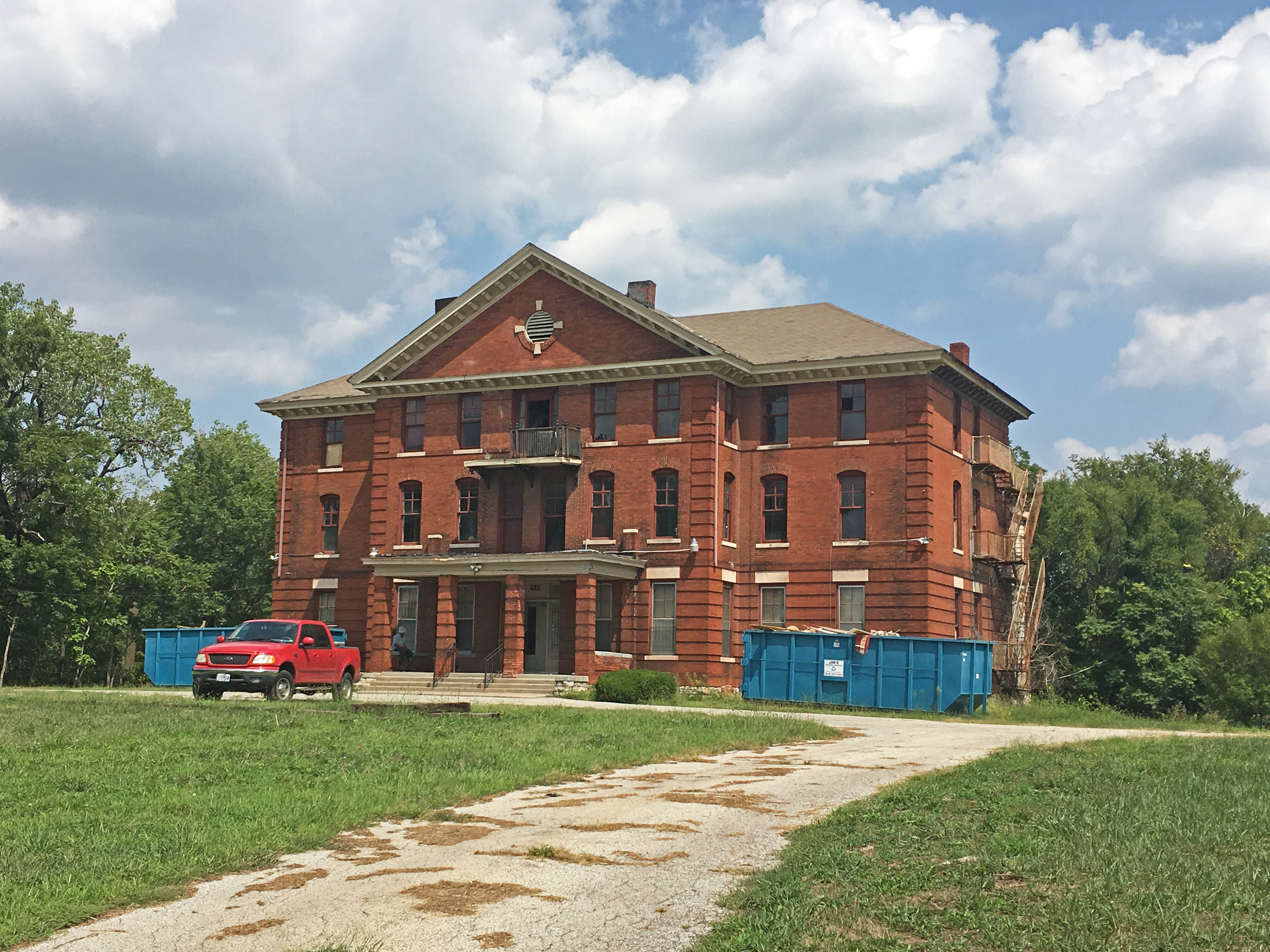
- Gillis Orphans' Home in 2018

- Location within Missouri
- Coordinates: 39°5′11.01″N 94°34′2.22″W
- Built by: YWCA
- Architectural style: Georgian
- NRHP reference No.: 1. 100001300

The Gillis Orphans' Home is a historic orphanage in Kansas City, Missouri, United States.

== History ==
The Gillis Orphans' Home was funded by Mary Ann Gillis, nephew of William Gillis, with his inheritance. It was built by members of the YWCA in 1900, on a 3.5 acres (0.014 km^{2}) property, donated by Thomas H. Swope. The wife of businessman S. B. Armour also donated $25,000 for the construction. In 1904, the Margaret Klock Armour Memorial Home was built next door. The Gillis Orphans' Home was originally called the Children's Home. During the 1920s and 1930s, the property was expanded to 26 acres after the nearby Memorial Home changed buildings. Ella C. Loose, wife of Jacob Loose, would give away a free pair of shoes and a dollar to all the orphans annually.

It was added to the National Register of Historic Places on July 10, 2017.

== Building description ==
Built in the Georgian style, the Gillis Orphans' Home is 3 stories, and is constructed with a main T-shape.
