= Elvira Wood (paleontologist) =

American paleontologist

- Born: February 11, 1865; Gouldsboro, Maine
- Died: December 30, 1928 (aged 63); Waltham, Massachusetts
- Education: Massachusetts Institute of Technology
- Alma mater: Columbia University: MA (1908), PhD (1910)

Elvira Wood (February 11, 1865 – December 30, 1928) was an American paleontologist who specialized in invertebrate paleontology.

== Biography ==
She was born in Gouldsboro, Maine but grew up in Boston, Massachusetts. She attended the State Normal School at Framingham.

Because of her gender, Wood was a "special student" in the Department of Geology at the Massachusetts Institute of Technology between 1893 and 1896. She earned a master's degree (1908) and a doctorate (1910) from Columbia University. Her doctorate thesis was titled The Phylogeny of Certain Cerithiidae. It was published by the New York Academy of Sciences.

== Paleontology ==
=== Museum and education work ===
She worked at the Museum of Comparative Zoology at Harvard University in the 1890s and again during the 1910s. While at the museum, she helped create exhibitions and cataloged fossils. She would eventually donate her own fossil collection to the museum.

Between 1896 and 1903, she worked as an instructor of paleontology at the Massachusetts Institute of Technology. Throughout this period, she did illustrations for and assisted many paleontologists, such as John Mason Clarke, the State Paleontologist of New York.

In 1907, she began work as an instructor in paleontology at Barnard College, where she would earn several degrees. In 1909, as her master's thesis, she edited and published Gerard Troost's unpublished monograph on the crinoids of Tennessee (1850). Her work was cited well into the 1970s. She became Curator in Columbia's Geology Department in 1909.

In 1917, she became the Assistant Curator in Paleontology at the American Museum of Natural History in New York, but after an accident in the same year, became disabled. She continued to construct models for the museum and create illustrations for scholarly publication from her home in Massachusetts.

=== United States Geological Survey ===
In 1903, Wood became the assistant to Charles D. Walcott, Director of the United States Geological Survey (USGS). She worked for the USGS until 1907.

=== Memberships ===
She gave a paper at the first meeting of the first annual meeting of the Paleontological Society. She was a member of the Boston Society of Natural History and the National Geographic Society.

=== Influence and impact ===
In 1898, Amadeus William Grabau named horn coral fossil Hadrophyllum woodi in her honor. Charles D. Walcott named the Middle Cambrian fossils Aluda woodi and Coscinocyathus elvira in her honor.

== Publications ==
- Wood, Elvira. Marcellus Limestones of Lancaster, Erie Co., N.Y. Paleontologic Papers 2, New York State Museum, December 1901.
- Wood, Elvira. A new Crinoid from the Hamilton of Charlestown, Indiana, American Journal of Science, Vol. XII, October 1901, pp. 1–14. Pl. V.
- Wood, Elvira. On New and Old Middle Devonic Crinoids, Smithsonian Miscellaneous Collections, Washington D.C., August 6, 1904, pp. 56–84, Pl. XV-XVI.
- Wood, Elvira. A Critical Summary of Troost's Unpublished Manuscript on the Crinoids of Tennessee, Smithsonian Institution United States National Museum Bulletin 64, Washington D.C., 1909, pp. 1–150, Pl. 1–15.
- Wood, Elvira. The Phylogeny of Certain Cerithidae, Annals of the New York Academy of Sciences, Volume XXIV, New York, May 1910, pp. 1–92, Pl. I-IX.
- Wood, Elvira. The Use of Crinoid Arms in Studies of Phylogeny, Annals of the New York Academy of Sciences, Volume XX, New York, 1914, pp. 1–14, Pl. I-V.
- Wood, Elvira. The Ancestry and Descendants of Ebenezer Wood of West Gouldsborough, Maine, Springfield Printing and Binding Company, Springfield, Mass. 1930.
