= Gerard Troost =

American mineralogist (1776–1850)

Gerardus Troost
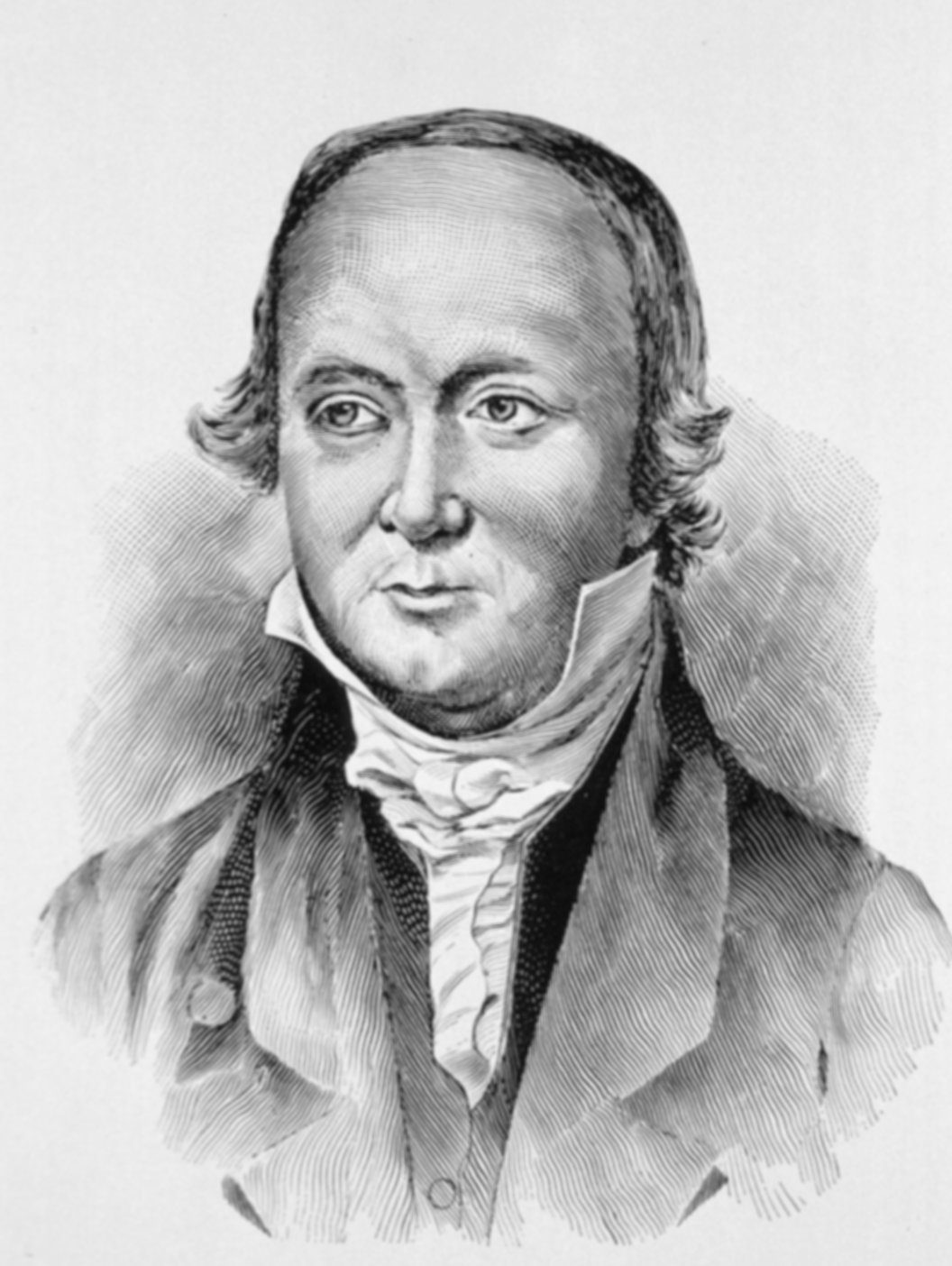
- Born: March 5, 1776 's-Hertogenbosch, Netherlands
- Died: August 14, 1850 (aged 74); Nashville, Tennessee, US
- Scientific career
- Fields: Mineralogy, biology

Gerardus Troost (March 5, 1776 – August 14, 1850) was a Dutch-American medical doctor, naturalist, mineralogist, and founding member and first president of the Philadelphia Academy of Natural Sciences.

== Biography ==
Troost was born in Den Bosch, Netherlands, to Anna Cornelia (Van Heeck) and Everardus Josephus Troost. He was the older brother of Benoist Troost. He received the degree of Doctor of Medicine from the University of Leyden, and of Master in Pharmacy, in 1801, from the University of Amsterdam. After a brief practice at Amsterdam and the Hague, he was enlisted in the army as a private soldier, and then as an officer of the first class in the medical department. During these periods of service, he was wounded in the thigh and in the head.

In 1807, Troost went to Paris under the patronage of Louis Napoleon, King of Holland. There he studied at the School of Mines with renowned mineralogist René Just Haüy. While in Paris, he translated into the Dutch language one of the earlier works of Alexander von Humboldt, The Aspects of Nature. This service brought him the cordial thanks of the author, with whom he maintained a friendly correspondence to the last.

In 1810, he settled in Philadelphia, Pennsylvania. While there, he lectured on chemistry and mineralogy and made a geological survey of the area surrounding the city. Doctor Troost served five years as president of the Philadelphia Academy of Sciences. In 1816, Troost was elected as a member of the American Philosophical Society.

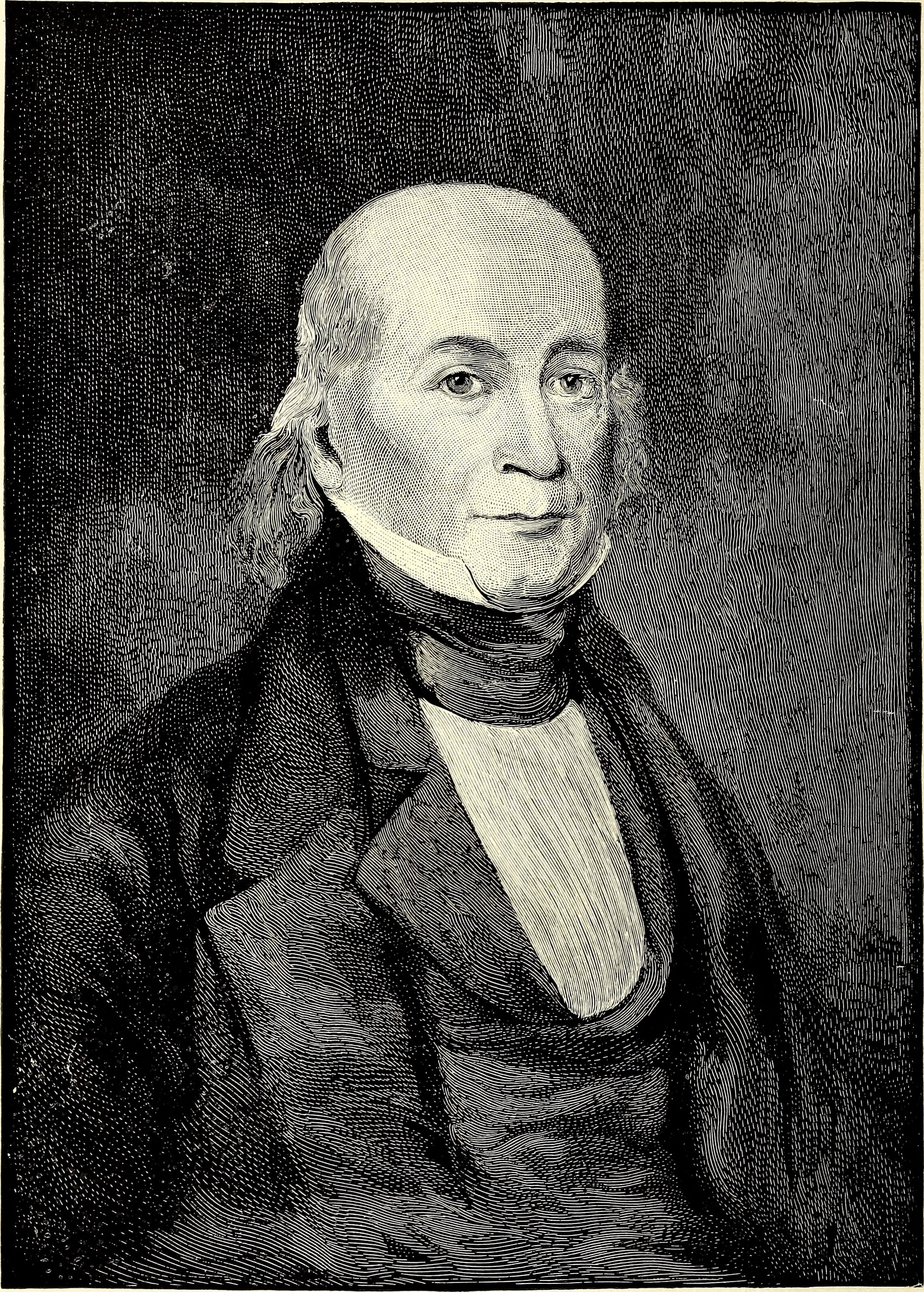
Drawing of Troost from a 1909 publication

In 1825, he joined the New Harmony experiment, in New Harmony, Indiana, with Thomas Say. In 1827, he moved to Nashville, Tennessee, where he became a professor of mineralogy and chemistry at the University of Nashville. From 1831 until 1850, he served as the State Geologist of Tennessee. While there he sent animal specimens to John Edwards Holbrook. His most enduring contribution to science was his method of doing geological surveys, which was carried on by David Dale Owen, son of Robert Owen, who went on to do several surveys of the American northwest.

Troost died in Nashville in August 1850 from cholera, which was epidemic in that city.

== Work and legacy ==
Troost is credited with describing, as new species, two North American reptiles: the alligator snapping turtle (Macrochelys temminckii) and the western cottonmouth (Agkistrodon piscivorus leucostoma). He is honored by having a subspecies of turtle named after him, the Cumberland turtle (Trachemys scripta troostii). The reddish-colored crystals of a variety of willemite found in New Jersey are known as troostite.

In 1866, Dr. Benjamin F. Shumard named a genus of fossil blastoids Troosticrinus in his honor.

In 1909, Elvira Wood edited and published Troost's unpublished monograph on the crinoids of Tennessee (1850). This brought Troost's previously unknown work back into geological and paleontological discourse.
