= Apalachicola snapping turtle =

Scientific classification (disputed)
- Kingdom: Animalia
- Phylum: Chordata
- Class: Reptilia
- Order: Testudines
- Suborder: Cryptodira
- Family: Chelydridae
- Genus: Macrochelys
- Species: M. apalachicolae

Binomial name
- Macrochelys apalachicolae Thomas et al., 2014

Species of turtle

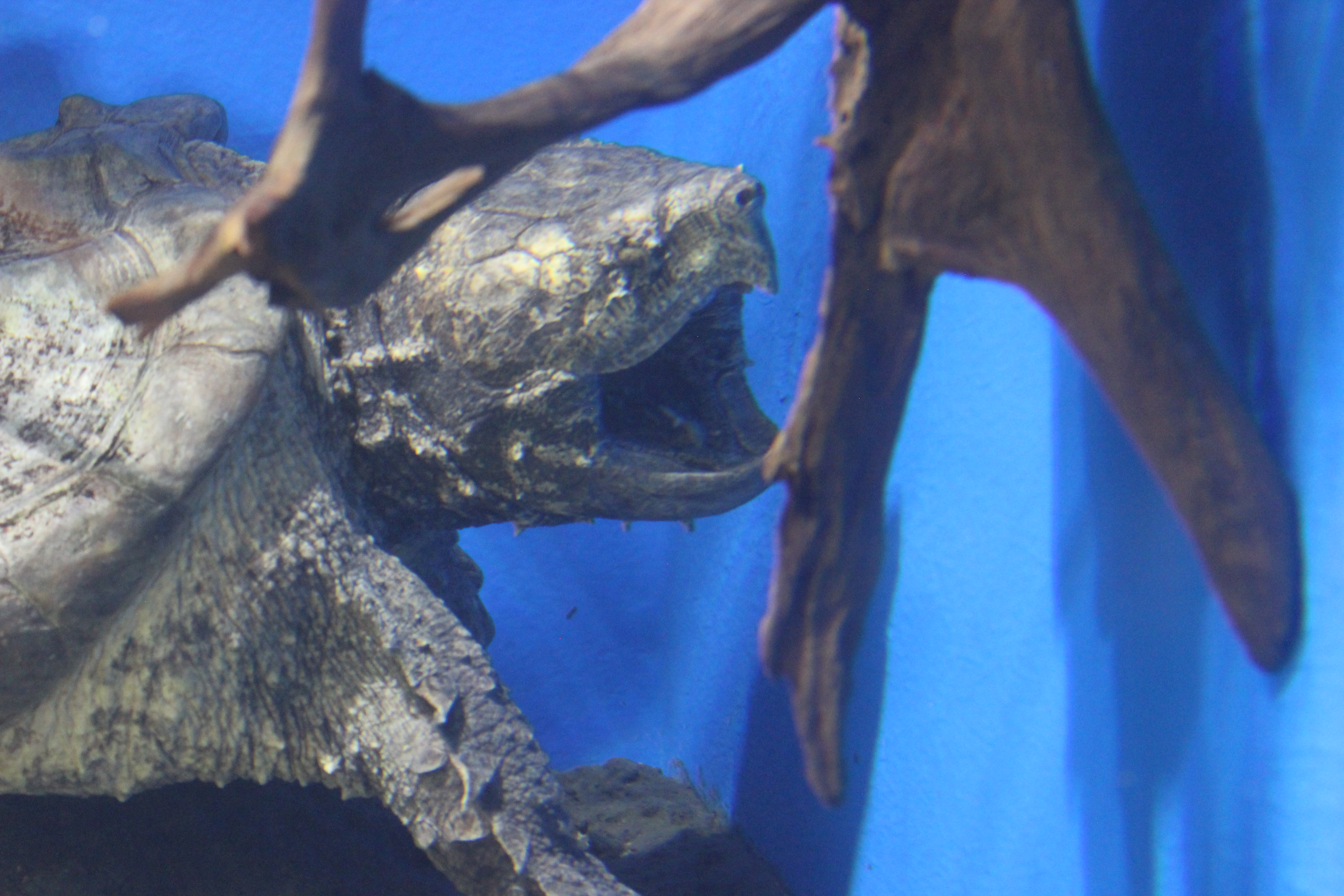
Apalachicola Snapping Turtle, Copenhagen, 2016

The Apalachicola snapping turtle (Macrochelys apalachicolae) is a proposed species that lives in the Apalachicola River, United States. The proposed species can as well be found within other panhandle rivers within the states of Florida, Georgia, and Alabama.

== Taxonomy ==
It has traditionally been included as part of the widespread species M. temminckii, but an analysis in 2014 recommended treating it as distinct. A study published the following year considered this change unwarranted, and recommended that M. apalachicolae should be considered a junior synonym of M. temminckii, and this is followed by the Reptile Database, IUCN's Tortoise and Freshwater Turtle Specialist Group, and the Committee On Standard English And Scientific Names (Society for the Study of Amphibians and Reptiles).

== Habitat ==
Macrochelys apalachicolae are highly aquatic and live in slow-moving, deep waters of rivers sloughs, oxbows, swamps, and tributary creeks. They prefer mud or sand bottoms and frequently take cover beneath logjams, undercut banks, or deep holes.

== Conservation ==
The Apalachicola snapping turtles and other species of snapping turtle have been described as endangered due to human activity, which is causing the destruction to their natural habitats.
