= Evelyn Straus =

American photojournalist

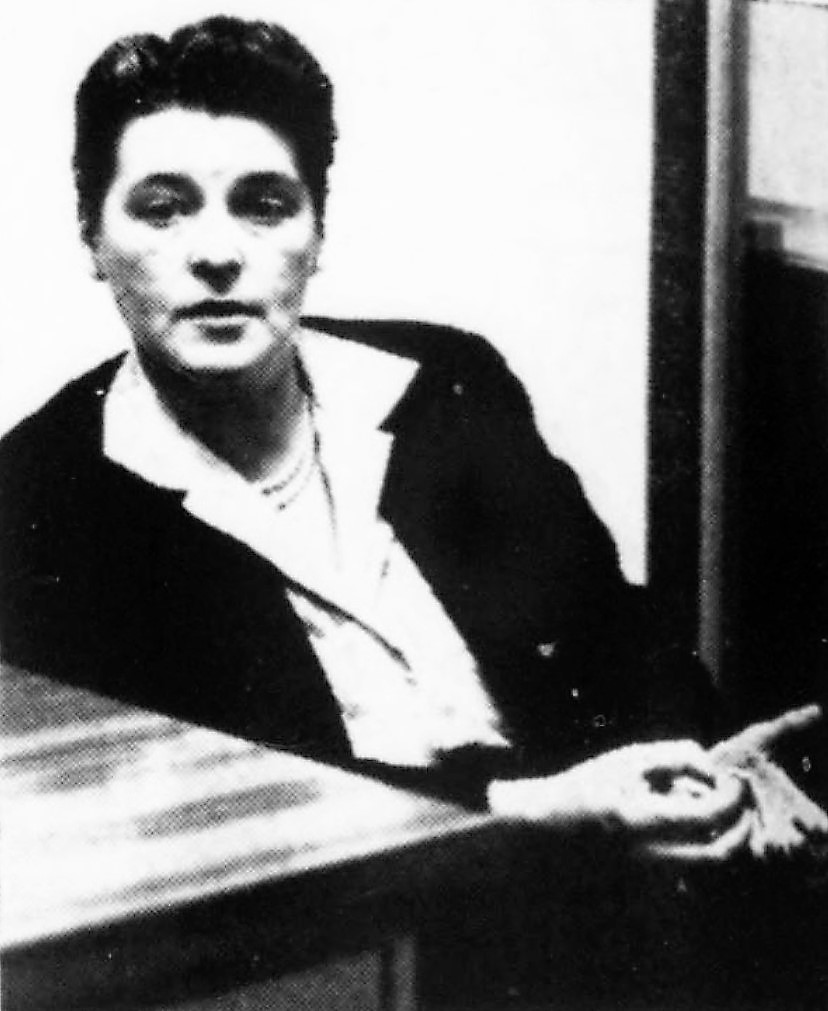
- Straus in 1962
- Born: June 22, 1916; Brooklyn, New York, US
- Died: March 10, 1992 (aged 75); Southampton, New York, US
- Occupation: photojournalist
- Years active: 1942–1975

Evelyn Straus (June 22, 1916 – March 10, 1992) was an American photojournalist and the first woman employed as a photographer at the Daily News in New York City. She was one of the first women admitted to the National Press Photographers Association in 1945 and joined the Press Photographers Association of New York City in 1952 as soon as they allowed women as members. During her career, she was a finalist for the Pulitzer Prize for Photography and had work featured at the Museum of Modern Art.

== Early life and education ==
Evelyn Straus was born on June 22, 1916, in Brooklyn, New York, to Dorothy C. and William R. Straus. She had an older brother, William Leroy Straus. From a young age, she developed an interest in photography, when an uncle bought her a camera and taught her how to use it. By the age of twelve or thirteen, she was experimenting with a photographic enlarger and had her own darkroom set up in her home. She began her secondary education at Franklin K. Lane High School in New York City, but transferred to Hempstead High School in 1931, when her family relocated to Nassau County, New York. After graduating from high school in 1933, Straus attended the Nassau County Collegiate Center for three years, and competed in sports, being named "Best Girl Athlete" at the school in 1937. She majored in liberal arts and social sciences, and earned a Bachelor of Arts degree.

== Career ==
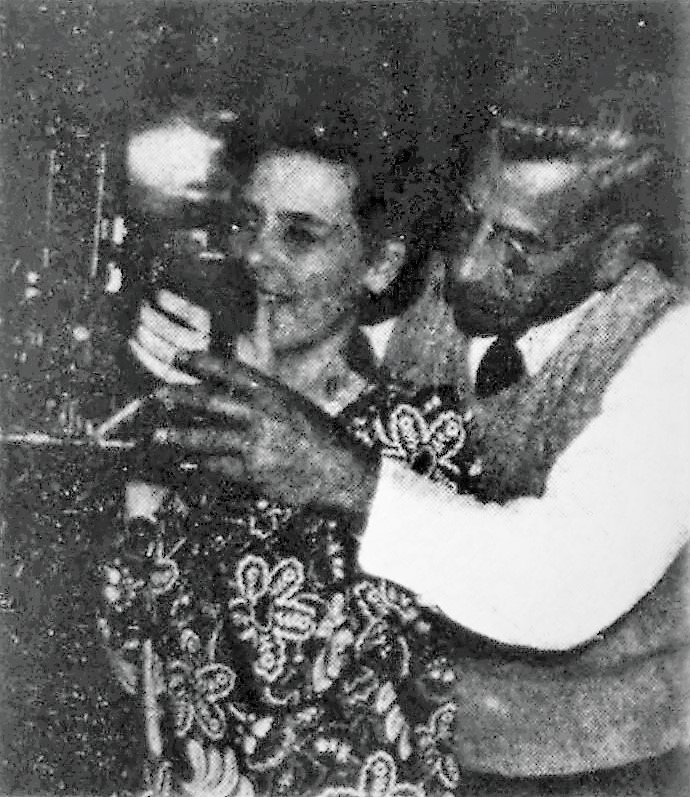
Hank Olen, New York Daily News photographer, instructing Evelyn Straus in the correct manner of holding a Speed Graphic, 1942

Straus began working at the Daily News in New York City in the advertising department in 1938 and later worked in the publicity department. During World War II many of the male photographers working in the press went overseas, opening opportunities for women. In 1942, Straus was transferred to become a trainee in news photography. She was the first woman the Daily News employed as part of their photography staff. She covered all types of stories, from politics to society, natural disasters to social movements, and general assignments to features. When asked if she needed special skills to do the job, Straus advised that other than athleticism, the job required customized wearing apparel. High heels and flat shoes were impractical, so she wore a walking shoe with a medium heel. She also had her clothes custom tailored to ensure that there were adequate pockets to carry personal items as well as film and flashbulbs.

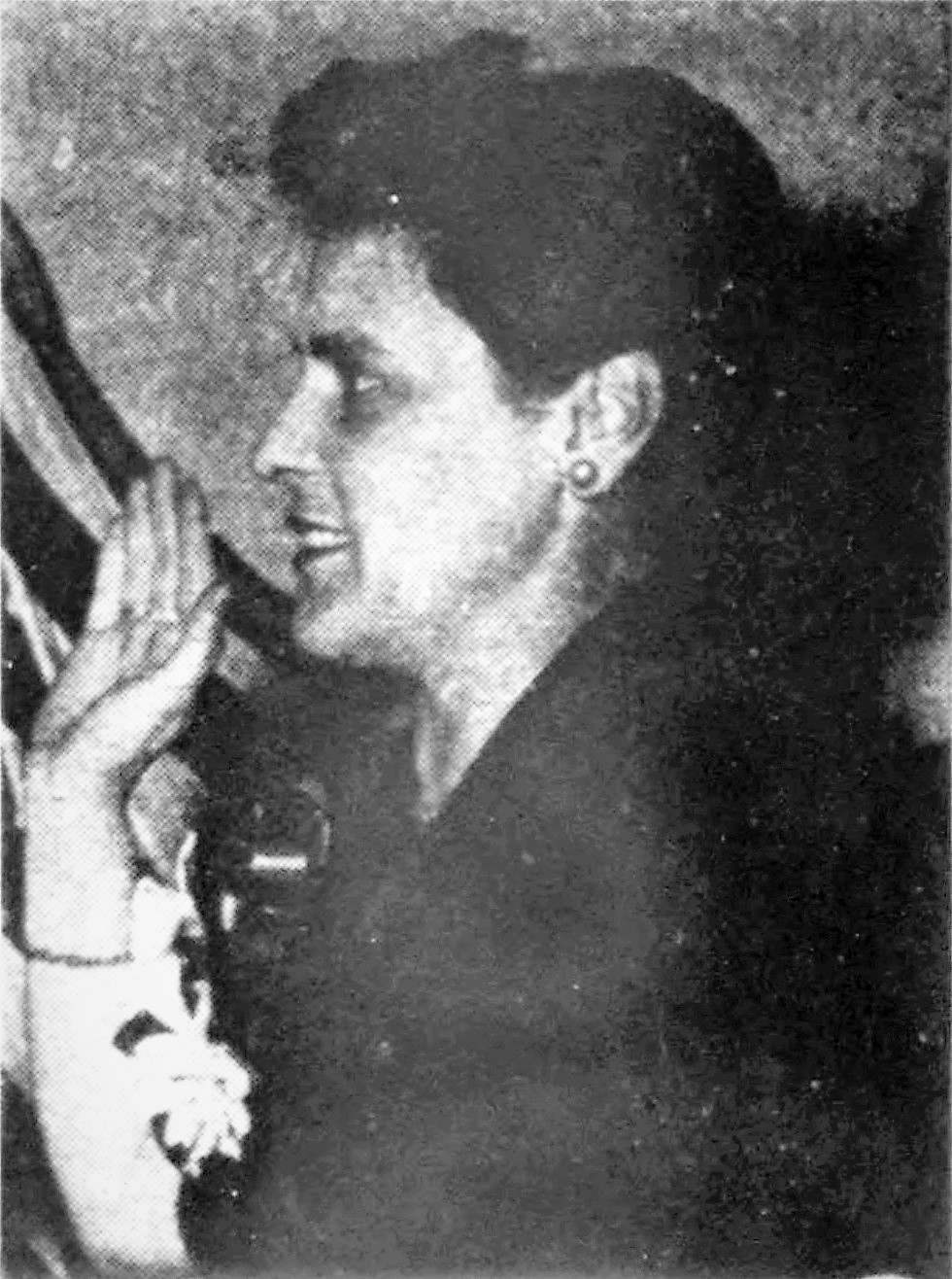
Daily News photographer Evelyn Straus being sworn into the Press Photographers Association of New York City, 1952

In July 1945, four months after the National Press Photographers Association was founded, Straus joined the organization along with five other women — Margaret Hazel of The Louisville Times, Adelaide Leavy of ACME Newspictures, Sodelvia Rihn of the Baltimore News-Post, Lucille Tandy of The San Diego Tribune and Libby Whitman of The Canton Repository. In 1952, still the only woman camera operator at the Daily News, Straus joined the Press Photographers Association of New York City, when they admitted women. The following year, her photograph, Panhandling Costello was among the six finalists for the Pulitzer Prize for Photography, though she lost to William M. Gallagher. One of her most iconic photographs appeared on the front page of the Daily News during the labor strikes that plagued William O'Dwyer's term as mayor from 1946 to 1949. It featured O'Dwyer mopping his brow during union negotiations. When Bob Warner did a series featuring women news photographers in the early 1960s for Editor & Publisher, he estimated that there were only about twenty full-time camerawomen in the news business at that time. Straus was one of them. Straus was well-known in political and celebrity circles and had work included in the 1973 exhibit, From the Picture Press at the Museum of Modern Art. She worked at the Daily News until her retirement in 1975.

== Personal life ==
When Straus retired, she moved to Montauk, New York, with her long-time partner Margaret "Peggy" Moffatt. Moffatt had been born in Nainital, India, while her parents were serving as missionaries there from 1920 to 1945. She attended Yakima High School in Yakima, Washington, and earned a nursing certification. She worked at the American Lake Veterans' Hospital in Pierce County, Washington, in the 1950s, but had moved to New York City in the 1960s, where she was employed as a nurse at Southampton Hospital. From 1967, the two women were vacationing together in Montauk at a cottage they kept on South Endicott Place in Lower Shepherds Neck and steadily entertained Moffatt's family members.

== Death and legacy ==
Straus died at the Southampton Hospital on Long Island, New York, on March 10, 1992. She is remembered for her pioneering role as a photojournalist and one of the few women to enter the field in the United States in the 1940s.
