= South Kortright, New York =

- Hamlet
- Location within New York Location within the United States
- Coordinates: 42°20′32″N 74°43′02″W
- Country: United States
- State: New York
- County: Delaware
- Elevation: 1,509 ft (460 m)
- Time zone: UTC-5 (Eastern (EST))
  - Summer (DST): UTC-4 (EDT)
- ZIP code: 13842
- Area code: 607
- GNIS feature ID: 965796

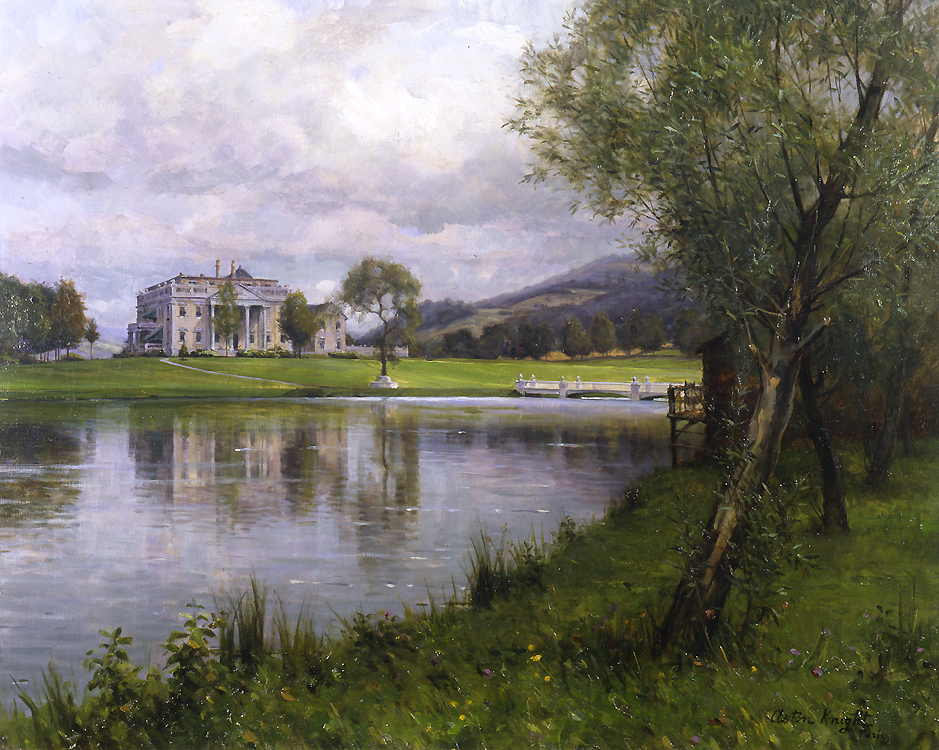
Riverside Farm – South Kortright, New York.

South Kortright is a hamlet in Delaware County, New York, United States. The community is located along New York State Route 10, 11.1 miles (17.9 km) east-northeast of Delhi. As of 2019 the hamlet has a population of 2349 and is 259.3 km^{2} (100.1 sq mi) in size.

South Kortright has the ZIP code 13842. South Kortright Central School District, established in 1940, enrolls students from South Kortright as well as the neighboring village of Hobart and hamlet of Bloomville.

== History ==
South Kortright and its surrounding region was used as hunting grounds by indigenous peoples of the Northeastern Woodlands, specifically the Lenni Lenape prior to 1763. European settlement began in the late 1780s, with several tracts of land in the village bought and used by farmers. The village gained a post office and the name South Kortright in 1823.

The hamlet grew in the late 1800s, with homes constructed along the main street and large estates built to the north and south of the river for Fifth Avenue Stage Line executive Samuel W. Andrews Sr. and copper baron James McLean, respectively. The construction and maintenance of these estates brought many European craftsmen to the hamlet, which in turn led to the eventual establishment of a Catholic church in South Kortright. In 1900 McLean funded the construction of a highly ornate stone bridge crossing the West Branch of the Delaware River with the cooperation of the Andrews Estate, reportedly costing $20,000 to build.

From 1912 to 1914 James McLean built a new mansion on his property for a reported cost of $100,000. After his death in 1920 his daughter Alice Throckmorton McLean took control of the house and estate and put it to use for her various philanthropic projects. She created an "International Valley" on the site for teaching the arts and hosted a large gathering of women from the United Nations with Eleanor Roosevelt at the mansion in 1946. She sold part of the property in 1953 and the mansion had various uses until 1992 when the property, by that point known as Belle Terre, was purchased by Phoenix House to be used as a private drug-treatment facility. They operated in the hamlet until 2015, and the mansion and grounds were later sold to artist Hunt Slonem.

The Andrews Estate was purchased by the New York State Division for Youth in 1967 and converted into a correctional and training school for boys, known informally as "the Boys School." The school remained active until 2011, when it was closed due to high vacancy. The hamlet's post office was closed in 2009 and mail functions were transferred to the nearby village of Hobart.

== Notable people ==
- Samuel W. Andrews Sr, owner and operator of New York City's Fifth Avenue Stage Line in the mid-1800s
- James McLean, metal baron of the Gilded Age known as "the Copper King"
- Alice Throckmorton McLean, American civic leader and founder of the American Women's Voluntary Services (AWVS) around the time of World War II
- Homer Benedict, Catskill folk artist known for his wooden models and figurines
- Anna Moschovakis, Greek-American writer, poet, and translator
