= Adelaide Leavy =

American sports and studio photographer

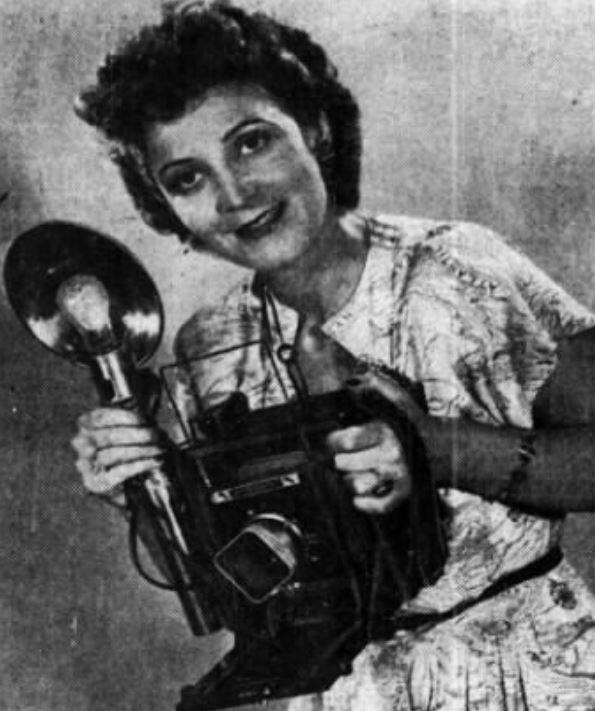
- Leavy in 1947
- Born: Adelaide Neuberger; May 29, 1913; Chicago, Illinois, US
- Died: March 18, 1999 (aged 85); Suffern, New York, US
- Other names: Addie Leavy, Addie Passen, Adelaide Millington, Adelaide N. Passen, Adelaide Neuberger Leavy, Adelaide Neuburger Millington, Adelaide Passen
- Occupation: Photographer
- Years active: 1941–1998
- Spouses: Richard B. Leavy (1937–1946, divorced); William N. Passen (1948–1962, widowed); Herbert Millington (1972–1987, widowed)
- Children: 2

Adelaide Leavy later worked as Addie Passen (May 29, 1913 – March 18, 1999) was a pioneering American photojournalist and one of the few women photographers who participated in sports photography beginning in the 1940s. She was one of the first women admitted to the National Press Photographers Association in 1945. Transitioning to studio work, she worked with cosmetic firms, models, and developed a reputation doing reference photographs for illustrators.

== Early life and education ==
Adelaide Neuburger was born on May 29, 1913, in Chicago, Illinois to Rose (née Kingsbaker) and Carl Neuburger. She studied math between 1930 and 1932 at the University of Wisconsin and then continued her studies at Columbia Business School in New York City. After graduating in 1935, she took courses in photography. In 1937, Neuberger married Richard B. Leavy of Boston, who was serving in the United States Army Coast Artillery Corps.

== Career ==
During World War II many of the male photographers working in the press went overseas, opening opportunities for women to enter the field. Leavy began working as a photographer in 1941, while she was in the American Women's Voluntary Services. She quickly was promoted to head their darkroom services. She was hired by ACME Newspictures in 1943, one month after she left the Voluntary Service. The following year, she was featured in an advertisement for DuBarry Cosmetics that appeared in Life Magazine.

After doing general assignments for a while, in 1943, Leavy began doing sports photography, one of the first women to cover sporting events. She was a rarity at sports venues and sometimes had difficulty convincing event organizers and other reporters that she was on assignment. Though Leavy covered basketball, horse racing, ice hockey, swimming, and tennis, she made a name for herself covering boxing matches each Friday at Madison Square Garden. Her photograph of the Rocky Graziano-Freddie Cochrane fight in 1945 gained good reviews. She said that the most difficult part of taking a good sports photograph was trying to anticipate when the action would happen. In July 1945, four months after the National Press Photographers Association was founded, Leavy joined the organization along with five other women — Margaret Hazel of The Louisville Times, Sodelvia Rihn of the Baltimore News-Post, Evelyn Straus of the New York Daily News, Lucille Tandy of The San Diego Tribune and Libby Whitman of The Canton Repository. Leavy moved from sports photography to fashion photography in the late 1940s.

Leavy divorced in 1946, but continued using the surname professionally until 1948, when she married William N. Passen, a public relations officer for the Hialeah Park Race Track. The couple would have two children, Jenny and Carl, before their marriage ended in 1962. By the early 1950s, she had her own studio, Addie Passen Photography, and was working with Helena Rubinstein's publicity department. (Note: Some sources say that she worked for the United Press International, which bought ACME in 1951, while others indicate that she left prior to the takeover by UPI.) Her office was in the Carnegie Hall Tower and she operated her studio for forty years. She was one of the first photographers to shoot Pat Cleveland, creating a portfolio for the fourteen year old in 1964. Around 1972, Passen married Herbert Millington, an economics professor, who lived in Upper Saddle River, New Jersey. She was one of the photographers who worked with Italian model Fabio when he first came to the United States in the late 1980s. Passen also did reference photographs for illustrator David B. Mattingly for his fantasy works through the 1990s, notably on Animorphs, as well as for other illustrators doing romance novel covers.

== Death and legacy ==
Millington died on March 18, 1999, in Suffern, New York. She is remembered for her pioneering role as a photojournalist and one of the few women to enter the field in the United States in the 1940s.
