= Josephine B. Sneed =

American county commissioner

Josephine B. Chenault Sneed

Cook County Commissioner
- In office 1964–1970
- Preceded by: Edward Mike Sneed
- Succeeded by: TBD based on sources

Personal details
- Born: Josephine B. Chenault; December 22, 1899 Mt. Sterling, Kentucky, U.S.
- Died: March 23, 1986 (aged 86) U.S.
- Party: Democratic
- Spouse: Edward Mike Sneed
- Occupation: Politician, community volunteer

Josephine B. Chenault Sneed (December 22, 1899 – March 23, 1986) was an American commissioner of Cook County, Illinois. She was the first African-American woman to serve on Cook County's Board of Commissioners. Prior to her election, she was a volunteer and board member in various community and women's organizations.

== Early life ==
Josephine B. Chenault was born on December 22, 1899, in Mt. Sterling, Kentucky to parents Mattie and Jeff Chenault.

== Career ==
In the 1930s, she was a member and volunteer of the Women's Board of the Provident Hospital in Chicago. During this time, she was also a lieutenant of the Salvation Army and coordinated the recruitment of volunteer workers.

During World War II, Sneed was a member of the American Women's Voluntary Services. She participated in the organization's committees and worked for their speaker's bureau. She additionally founded the Women's Auxiliary of the Hektoen Institute for Medical Research, which was a part of the Cook County Hospital in Chicago. She was later a board member and assistant financial secretary of the Auxiliary.

Sneed was also a member of the Federation of Illinois Women's Democratic Clubs. Between 1951 and 1952, she was chair of the group's Ways and Means Committee, which raised funds to support women's activities at the 1952 Democratic National Convention. By 1964, she was the vice president of the Federation of Illinois Women's Democratic Clubs.

Josephine Sneed married Edward Mike Sneed. He was a Cook County Commissioner in Illinois. On June 27, 1964, her husband died, leaving open the position he was serving in as Cook County Commissioner. After his death, Josephine Sneed was elected as commissioner to serve the remaining two years of her husband's term. The term lasted until November 1966, and that year, she was reelected commissioner as a Democratic candidate. She went on to serve on the Finance and Public Service Committees, and she was Vice Chair of the Oak Forest Hospital Subcommittee and the County Jail, Criminal Court and Court House Subcommittee. Sneed served as a commissioner until 1970.

== Legacy ==
Sneed died on March 23, 1986. Her son Edward L. Sneed became an engineer for the Cook County Highway Department.
