= Royal Voluntary Service =

Voluntary organisation in the United Kingdom

- Formation: 16 May 1938; 88 years ago (as the Women's Voluntary Service for Civil Defence)
- Founder: Stella Isaacs, Marchioness of Reading
- Legal status: Charity
- Coordinates: 51.538303°N 3.130287°W
- Patron: Queen Camilla
- President: Queen Camilla
- CEO: Catherine Johnstone CBE
- Website: royalvoluntaryservice.org.uk
- Formerly called: Women's Voluntary Service (WVS, 1938–1966); Women's Royal Voluntary Service (WRVS, 1966–2004); WRVS (2004–2013)

The Royal Voluntary Service (known as the Women's Voluntary Services (WVS) from 1938 to 1966; Women's Royal Voluntary Service (WRVS) from 1966 to 2004 and WRVS from 2004 to 2013) is a voluntary organisation concerned with helping people in need throughout England, Scotland and Wales. It was founded in 1938 by Stella Isaacs, Marchioness of Reading, as a British women's organisation to recruit women into the Air Raid Precautions (ARP) services to help in the event of war.

== Objectives ==
On 16 May 1938, the British government set out the objectives of the Women's Voluntary Service for Civil Defence:

It was seen "as the enrolment of women for Air Raid Precaution Services of Local Authorities, to help to bring home to every household what air attack may mean, and to make known to every household [in the country] what it can do to protect itself and the community."

In the words of Home Secretary Sir Samuel Hoare, "as regards their civil defence functions, the Minister regards the Women's Voluntary Service as occupying ... much the same relationship as that of the women's auxiliary services for the armed forces of the Crown."

Immediately after its formation, Queen Mary assumed the role of patron while Queen Elizabeth began serving as its president in December 1938.

== Organisation and structure ==
The WVS/WRVS was a voluntary organisation, and it was Lady Reading's vision that there would be no ranks. It was perhaps the only organisation where you could find a Duchess and a charlady working side by side. While many members of the WVS mucked in on pretty much all tasks, an organisation without any hierarchy would not have worked so, while there were no ranks, there were titles. Women were recruited for specific tasks, whether that was to drive ambulances, join in a knitting work party, or to collect National Savings. Inevitably those women who signed up for one thing often ended up being co-opted for other work, especially if they showed aptitude.

The WVS was split into 12 Regions (using the same boundaries as the Civil Defence Corps) which started with 1 in the NE of England and moved clockwise down the country and back up. Scotland was Region 11 and London Region 12. Each Region had a Regional Administrator who was paid for by the Home Office. Under this each county had a County Organiser and 'staff' and below that were the Centres. During and after the Second World War there were almost 2,000 WVS centres around Great Britain (and in Northern Ireland during the Second World War), each at the sharp end of providing help to their communities. Each was prominently positioned within a town or village and was run by a Centre Organiser appointed by Headquarters in London. Each Centre Organiser had a team of members who were responsible for different aspect of WVS work e.g. evacuation, Training, Food or Clothing. Under their direction were the 'ordinary' members.

While Centre Organisers had ultimate control over the work they did in their areas, they were tightly scrutinised by the County and Regional offices and Headquarters. Each Centre had to file a monthly Narrative Report in quadruplicate which allowed both the sharing of good practice and ideas, but also allowed those in charge to keep tabs on their members. These Narrative reports which were produced from 1938-1992 are inscribed on the UK Memory of the World Register, part of UNESCO's Memory of the World Programme and are considered one of the most important documents for social and women's history produced in the 20th century. In addition headquarters issued substantial numbers of circular notices each year informing Organisers of new projects and re-enforcing the rules and regulations.

This structure stayed in place almost unchanged until the Local Government reorganisations in the 1970s which changed boundaries and led to changes in regional organisation and the amalgamation and closure of some centres as District Councils were introduced. Through the 1990s cost-cutting and the professionalisation of the organisation meant that Centre Organisers and County and Regional Offices were phased out and the centres were closed. Headquarters which had been in London since 1938 was moved out to Milton Hill House in Oxfordshire in 1997 and by 2004 there were no local or regional centres remaining. The organisation of large areas (usually comprising several counties) and the services within them were taken on by members of staff and local services (such as Meals on Wheels, Darby and Joan clubs or Hospital Shops) were managed independently.

In 2013 the Royal Voluntary Service resurrected the centre model, which are now called 'Hubs' and there are 67 spread across Great Britain.

== World War II ==
=== Evacuation, clothing distribution and returning soldiers ===
The WVS played a key part in the evacuation of civilians from urban areas, overseen by National Administrator Kathleen Halpin. The WVS had been asked to pinpoint areas of safety and billeting for evacuated children. Moving children out of the cities proved reasonably easy. Getting them to a known area of safety proved a lot more difficult as trains did not always arrive at an expected destination or would turn up at a reception point unexpectedly. The WVS is credited with helping to move 1.5 million people (the majority were children) out of cities in the early days of September 1939.

The WVS also played a major role in the collection of clothing required for the needy. In October 1939, Lady Reading broadcast to the United States about the need for clothing in the UK. The broadcast led to large quantities of clothing (known as "Bundles for Britain") being sent by the American Red Cross and distributed from WVS Emergency Clothing Stores.

When troops returned to ports after the evacuation at Dunkirk, members of the WVS were there to greet them and hand out food, drink and warm clothing. The WVS base at the railway station in Headcorn, Kent was an especially busy place for feeding returning soldiers before they dispersed—a spit was installed so that meat could be roasted on the spot. The WVS also played a vital part during the Blitz bombings of British cities.

=== The WVS during the Blitz ===
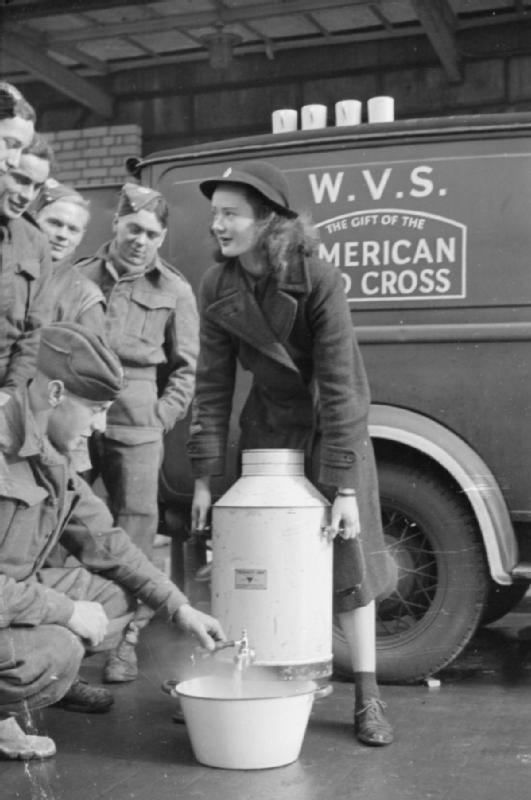
Women of the Women's Voluntary Service run a Mobile Canteen in London, 1941

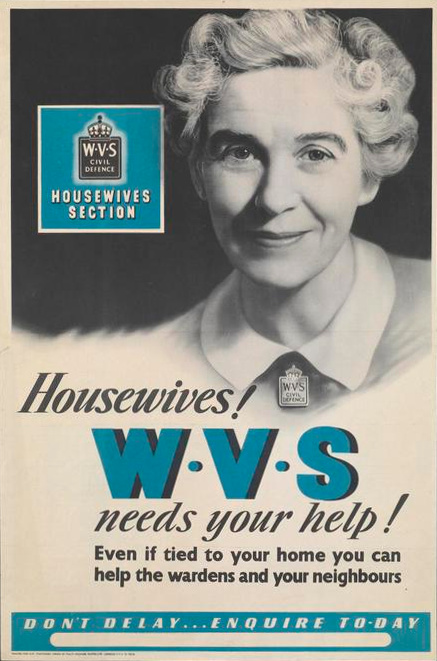
WVS poster

By the time of the Blitz, women in the WVS were adept at providing food and drink around the clock. While ARP wardens and firemen fought the fires, women in the WVS set up mobile canteens to keep them refreshed, thus placing themselves in serious physical danger with collapsing buildings a constant threat. When a raid ended, the WVS also played a part in looking after the injured and those who had lost their homes. Records indicate that the WVS dealt with and helped over 10,000 people every night of the Blitz.

The London Blitz lasted for 57 nights, and the WVS helped a great many people who went to their rest centres. Some people stayed for a night; many stayed for much longer and stretched the resources of the WVS to the limit. In Barnes, one WVS member fed 1,200 bomb victims in just one day, cooking in her own kitchen.

It would be difficult to overstate the importance of the work done by the WVS during the Blitz: the rest centres provided shelter, food, and importantly, sanitation. But working so near to the centre of the bombing inevitably led to casualties. 241 members of the WVS were killed during the Blitz and many more were wounded. 25 WVS offices were destroyed.

=== Other activities ===
The WVS began running IIPs (Incident Inquiry Points), places where people came to find out about their loved ones who were in an area that had been bombed in order to free the ARP to work with the fire brigade. The WVS also helped with the Queen's Messenger Food Convoys which took food to areas in need after a bombing raid. The people who survived the bombing of Coventry received help from one of the convoys with 14,000 meals being served.

By 1941, one million women belonged to the WVS. Their work did not slacken after the end of the Luftwaffe's bombing raids. The Battle of the Atlantic and the devastating toll of merchant ships sunk by U-boats led to shortages in Great Britain. The WVS did all that it could to assist in the collection of required material for the war effort and also to educate people not to waste what they had.

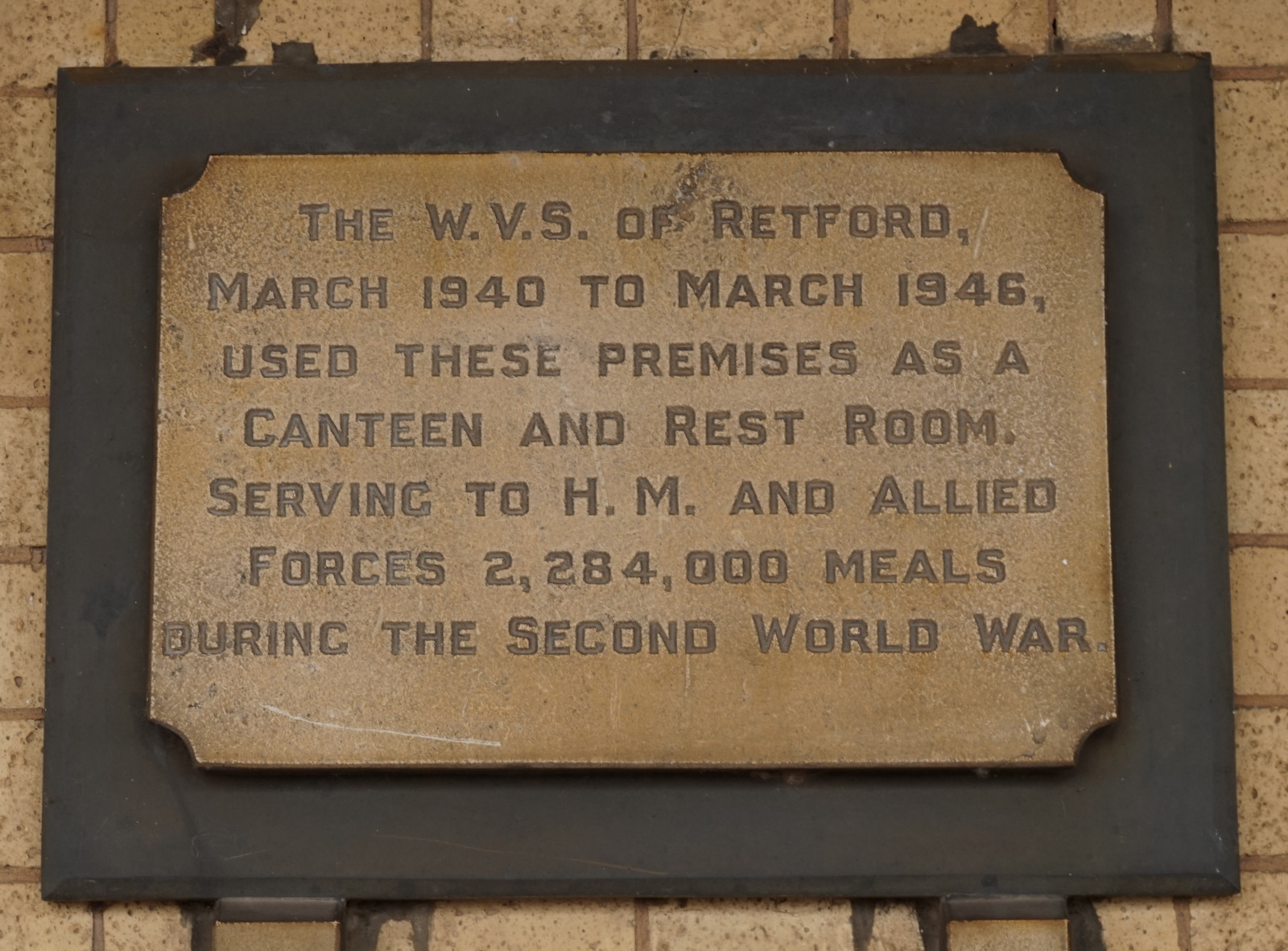
Plaque commemorating the work of the WVS of Retford during WWII

Each WVS centre had its own Salvage Officer and Food Leader. The Food Leader did whatever was required at a local level to assist the authorities in the complicated task of food rationing. Educational pamphlets were produced and lectures held. The WVS organised campaigns such as Salute the Soldier Week, Wings for Victory Week and Warship Week.

Retford train station in Retford, Nottinghamshire has a plaque to commemorate the contribution of the WVS during the war. Retford was on a busy railway junction. The WVS of Retford used the canteen and rest room to serve almost 2.3 million meals to British and Allied forces between 1940 and 1946, at a rate of over 1,000 meals per day.

=== D-Day ===
In the buildup to D-Day, the expertise the WVS had in catering was put to use again. The skills learned during the Blitz were again put to good use when the V-1 and V-2 rockets fell on London. Once again, the WVS played a key role in evacuation. With the success of D-Day, the WVS moved into Europe to support troops there. The first WVS abroad had landed in Italy with the success of the invasion there.

=== Overseas WVS organisations ===
The WVS model proved to be so successful that other countries around the world set up their own versions during the war, with the assistance of the British WVS. The most successful of these was formed in 1942 in India, especially in Bengal, which had during the war a membership of over 10,000 and continued into the 1950s. In the US the American Women's Voluntary Services was started soon after the start of the war in Europe by Alice Throckmorton McLean, who had become familiar with the WVS in Northampton, England. WVS organisations were also set up in Canada and Australia.

=== Defence Medal ===
To reflect their role during the war, WVS members were eligible for the Defence Medal – the campaign medal awarded for home defence – on the same basis as members of the emergency services.

== Post World War II ==
In the immediate post war era, the WVS continued to operate as food rationing remained in place. Such was their work, that the new Labour government funded the WVS from central government funds.

In 1951, the W.V.S. Roll of Honour, listing 241 members of the WVS who were killed in the line of duty during World War II, was created by Claire Evans, B.E.M., Irene Base and Roger Powell. Made of vellum and bound in Moroccan leather, it was taken on a three-month tour around British cathedrals, guild halls and museums. An inscription at the end of the list read "Everlasting Father, we commend to thee all those for whom the end of the war is not the end of suffering, the wounded, the homeless, the hungry, the bereaved."

In 1952, Queen Elizabeth II agreed to become patron of the WVS and in 1966, she awarded the service the honour of adding 'Royal' to its title, it becoming the Women's Royal Voluntary Service.

The organisation evolved to helping isolated and lonely people, particularly the elderly. They are particularly well known as providers of the Meals on Wheels service which delivers hot meals to the housebound. Their mission is "to help people to maintain independence and dignity in their homes and communities, particularly in later life."

In 1968, the government dismantled the Civil Defence Corps, to which WRVS had been affiliated, and WRVS was registered as a charity from 16 January 1968.

== Present day ==
They provide practical services to thousands of older and housebound people daily, such as Meals on Wheels, Good Neighbours, and community transport.

They also run hospital shops and cafés where any profits are returned to the hospital to improve services for patients, staff and visitors.

Royal Voluntary Service emergency teams provide back-up to the professional services and members of the public in times for major incidents such as the Lockerbie disaster, Hillsborough disaster, Buncefield fuel depot blast and flooding crises in July 2007 by running rest centres and providing emergency feeding to members of the public, fire crews and police.

In 2004, the organisation's name was changed from the Women's Royal Voluntary Service to simply WRVS in an attempt to modernise its image and in recognition of the fact that 11% of its 60,000 volunteers were men. In 2013, it changed its name to Royal Voluntary Service, to further dispel the myth that it is an organisation for women only; currently about 5% of its volunteers are men.

On 24 March 2020, in response to COVID-19, the National Health Service called for 250,000 new volunteers from the general public in England and Wales to be directed by a call-centre run by the RVS to help self-isolating vulnerable and elderly people requiring assistance. The following day, it was announced that more than 400,000 had volunteered. By the end of the week, recruitment to the "NHS Volunteer Responders" was halted to enable the more than 750,000 applications to be processed by the RVS.

In May 2024, Queen Camilla became the organisation's patron, having previously served as its president since December 2012.

GoVo launch - In March 2025, Royal Voluntary Service announced to the public that it would be launching GoVo, a digital volunteering platform created by Royal Voluntary Service (RVS) with support from players of People's Postcode Lottery. Due to launch on 17 October, GoVo is designed to connect people with charities based in England, Scotland and Wales in need of volunteers. The platform aims to offer a flexible way for people to engage with causes in their communities or remotely.

Development of the platform has been shaped by feedback from charities and sector partners, with a focus on making it easy to use for both organisations and volunteers. Accessibility and flexibility have been emphasised to ensure the service works for a wide range of people and opportunities.

To date, thousands of organisations have signed up pre-launch, including major national organisations including Oxfam, Blue Cross and Parkinson's UK alongside hundreds of local and community groups.

== Uniform ==
The WVS got its first uniform in June 1939 when an overcoat and hat was launched. They and the suit uniform which followed shortly after were designed by Digby Morton, the famous London couturier, and the thick green/grey Harris tweed from which they were produced was supplied by Harrods. The uniform was not free however, and a full suit uniform, coat, hat and scarf cost £9 4s 7d in 1940, about two weeks of the average man's wages.

The first free WVS uniform would not be introduced until 1953 when those WVS members who were part of the Civil Defence Corps were issued with a free dress, beret and overcoat. The uniform was not compulsory, except for those carrying out certain roles (such as manning a mobile canteen) and many members wore WVS overalls or just their membership badge.

The WVS uniform changed very little over the years, the first change was in 1966, when the cut of the suits was altered to make them more fashionable, and then in the 1970s polyesters were introduced. WRVS ceased to be a uniformed organisation in 1998 and today volunteers can wear their own clothes (and the organisation badge) or branded work-wear, such as polo shirts and fleeces.

== Women's Royal Voluntary Service Medal ==
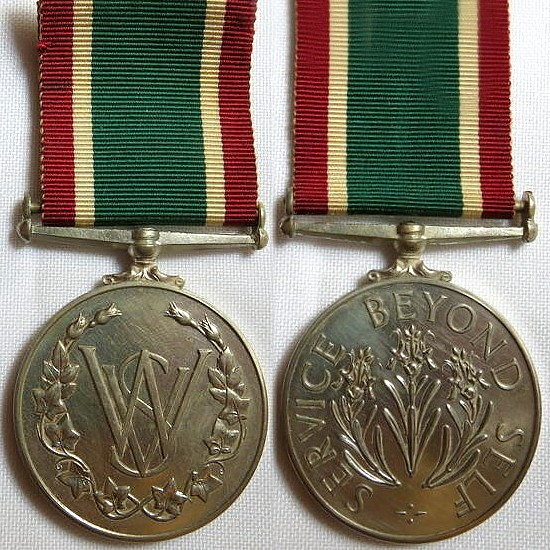

The Women's Voluntary Service Medal was instituted on 23 March 1961, when the Home Secretary Rab Butler announced in the Commons that Queen Elizabeth II had approved the medal.

The WVS Long Service medal is presented by Royal Voluntary Service on behalf of the King and is awarded to a volunteer after they complete forty duties each year over a period of fifteen years. Holders of the medal qualify for the award of a clasp after each subsequent period of twelve years service.

When the WVS was awarded the prefix ‘Royal’ in 1966, it was initially decided not to re-name the medal to reflect the new title of the organisation, as it was considered unfair to differentiate between those who had received the medal before 1966 and those after. Some thirty years later, the medal's name was changed to the Women's Royal Voluntary Service Medal, this name remaining even after the organisation became the Royal Voluntary Service in 2013.

By 2015, approximately 35,000 medals had been awarded.

== In popular culture ==
Mass-Observation diarist Nella Last joined the Women's Voluntary Service in her hometown of Barrow-in-Furness at the outbreak of World War Two. Her wartime diary contains frequent references to her WVS work. Her association with the WVS and its members are a central feature of the 2006 made-for-TV film dramatisation of her wartime diaries.
