= Stork Club =

Nightclub in Manhattan, New York (1929–1965)

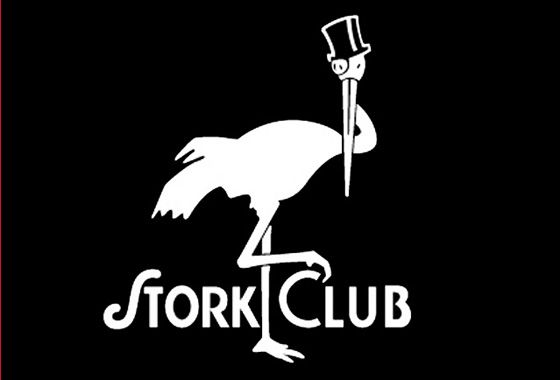

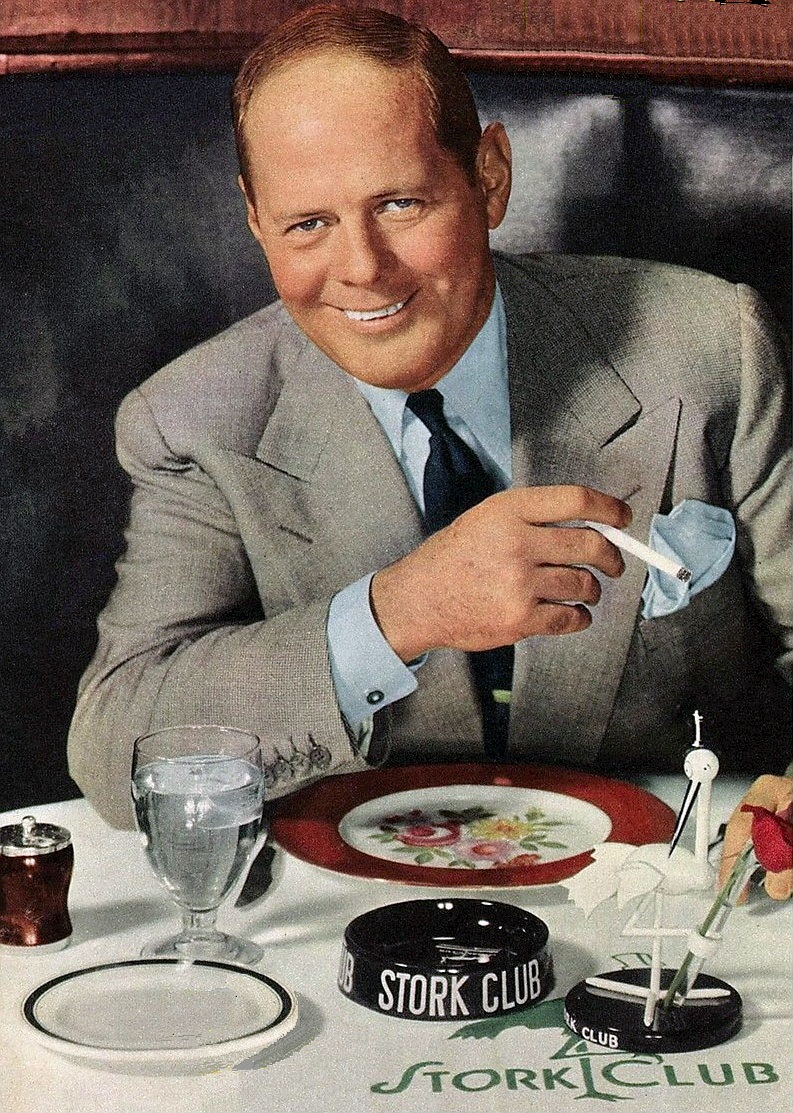
- Owner Sherman Billingsley at the Stork Club in 1951
- Interactive map of Stork Club
- Address: 132 West 58th Street (1929–1931); 51 1/2 East 51st Street (1931–1934); 3 East 53rd Street (1934–1965); Manhattan, New York, US
- Coordinates: 40°45′37″N 73°58′31″W
- Owner: Sherman Billingsley

Construction
- Opened: 1929
- Closed: October 4, 1965

Stork Club was a nightclub in Manhattan, New York City, United States. During its existence from 1929 to 1965, it became one of the most prestigious clubs in the world. A symbol of café society, the wealthy elite, including movie stars, celebrities, showgirls, and aristocrats all mixed in the VIP 'Cub' Room. The club was established on West 58th Street in 1929 by Sherman Billingsley, a former bootlegger from Enid, Oklahoma. After an incident when Billingsley was kidnapped and held for ransom by Mad Dog Coll, a rival of his mobster partners, he became the sole owner of the Stork Club. It remained at its original location until it was raided by Prohibition agents in 1931 after which it moved to East 51st Street. From 1934 until its closure in 1965, it was located at 3 East 53rd Street, just east of Fifth Avenue, when it became world-renowned with its celebrity clientele and luxury. Billingsley was known for his lavish gifts, which brought a steady stream of celebrities to the club and also ensured that those interested in the famous would have a reason to visit.

Until World War II, the club consisted of a dining room and bar with restrooms on upper floors with many mirrors and fresh flowers throughout. Billingsley originally built the well-known Cub Room as a private place where he could play cards with friends. Described as a "lopsided oval", the room had wood paneled walls hung with portraits of beautiful women and had no windows. A head waiter known as "Saint Peter" determined who was allowed entry to the Cub Room, where Walter Winchell wrote his columns and broadcast his radio programs from Table 50.

During the years of its operation, the club was visited by many political, social, and celebrity figures. It counted among its guests the Kennedy and Roosevelt families, and the Duke and Duchess of Windsor. The news of Grace Kelly's engagement to Prince Rainier of Monaco broke while the couple were visiting the Stork Club. Socialite Evalyn Walsh McLean, owner of the Hope Diamond, once lost the gem under a Stork Club table during an evening visit to the club. Ernest Hemingway was able to cash his $100,000 check for the film rights of For Whom the Bell Tolls at the Stork Club to settle his bill.

In the 1940s, workers of the Stork Club desired to be represented by a union, and by 1957, the employees of all similar New York venues were union members. However, Billingsley was still unwilling to allow his workers to organize, which led to union supporters picketing in front of the club for many years until its closure. During this time, many of the club's celebrity and non-celebrity guests stopped visiting the Stork Club; it closed in 1965 and was demolished the following year. The site is now the location of Paley Park, a small vest-pocket park.

== History ==
=== Early history ===
The Stork Club was owned and operated by Sherman Billingsley (1896–1966) an ex-bootlegger who came to New York from Enid, Oklahoma. (Note: In later years, Billingsley claimed to have been born in 1900, but this is refuted by both the 1930 census and the Social Security Death Index.) The Stork Club first opened in 1929 at 132 West 58th Street, just down the street from Billingsley's apartment at 152 West 58th Street. Billingsley's handwritten recollections of the early days recall that he was approached by two gamblers he knew from Oklahoma in his New York real estate office, proposing to open a restaurant together, which he accepted. The origin of the name of the club is unknown; Billingsley once remarked, "Don't ask me how or why I picked the name, because I just don't remember." New York City's El Morocco had the sophistication and Toots Shor's drew the sporting crowd, but the Stork Club mixed power, money, and glamor. Unlike its competitors, the Stork stayed open on Sunday nights and during the summer.

One of the first Stork Club customers was writer Heywood Broun, who resided in the vicinity. Broun's first visit to the Stork was actually made by mistake; he believed it to be a funeral home, but he soon became a regular, and invited his celebrity friends, as the name of the club spread further afield. Before long, Billingsley's Oklahoma partners sold their shares to a man named Thomas Healy. Eventually, Healy revealed that he was a "front" for three New York mobsters. (Note: Healy told Billingsley the three mobsters were Owney Madden, Big Bill Dwyer, and Frenchy De Mange.) Billingsley was kidnapped and held for ransom by Mad Dog Coll, who was a rival of his mob partners. Before the ransom money could be collected by Coll, he was lured to a telephone booth, where he was shot to death. (Note: Billingsley's notes indicate he was forced into a car on Madison Avenue and blindfolded after having dinner with Texas Guinan. Only a few hours before Coll was killed, Walter Winchell's New York Daily Mirror column said that he would be gunned down by members of the Chicago mob, who had arrived in New York for this purpose. Coll was said to be on the telephone with Owney Madden when he was shot to death.) After the incident, the secret gangster partners reluctantly allowed Billingsley to buy them out for $30,000.

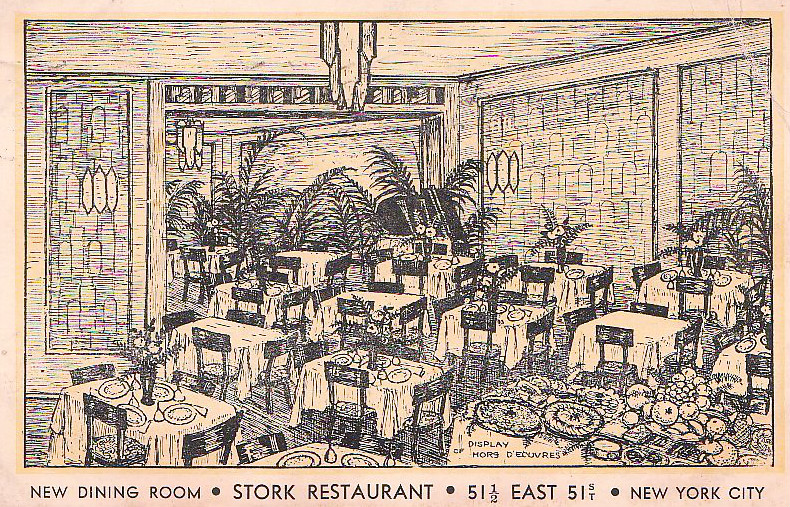
The club's dining room on East 51st Street in 1933

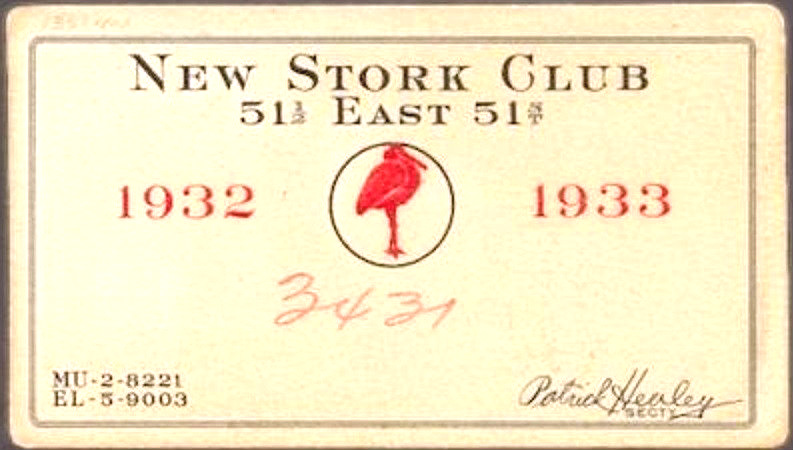
Membership card, 1932–1933

Another New York nightclub owner, Texas Guinan, introduced Billingsley to her friend, the entertainment and gossip columnist Walter Winchell, in 1930. In September 1930, Winchell called the Stork Club "New York's New Yorkiest place on W. 58th" in his New York Daily Mirror column. That evening, the Stork Club was filled with moneyed guests. Someone else who read Winchell's column in 1930 was singer-actress Helen Morgan, who had just finished filming a movie on Long Island. Morgan decided to hold a cast party at the Stork Club, paying the tab with two $1,000 bills. Winchell became a regular at the Stork Club; what he saw and heard there at his private Table 50 was the basis of his newspaper columns and radio broadcasts. Billingsley also kept professionals on his staff whose job was to listen to the chatter, determine fact from rumor, and then report the factual news to local columnists. The practice was seen as protective of the patrons by shielding them from unfounded reports, and also a continual source of publicity for the club. Billingsley's long-standing relationship with Ethel Merman, which began in 1939, brought the theater crowd to the Stork; there, she had a waiter assigned to her whose job was just to light her cigarettes. (Note: Billingsley had additional connections in the theatrical world. His wife, Hazel, was a former Ziegfeld girl.) Billingsley later wrote that Merman had offered him $500,000 to leave his wife and that he turned down the offer. (Note: After the affair between Merman and Billingsley ended, Merman eventually felt comfortable enough to return to being a regular at the club.)

Prohibition agents closed the original club on December 22, 1931, and Billingsley moved it to East 51st Street for three years. It was raided on August 29, 1932, at the 51st Street location after an angry patron lost a quarter in a coin machine and notified police. The police asked guests to quietly pay their checks and leave the building; this took two hours. (Note: When Prohibition had ended, FBI director J. Edgar Hoover was a frequent visitor to the club, often as the guest of Walter Winchell.) In 1934, the Stork Club moved to 3 East 53rd Street, where it remained until it closed in October 1965. Billingsley's guest list for the 53rd Street opening consisted of people from Broadway and Park Avenue. He sent out 1,000 invitations for champagne and dinner. The women found much to like about the fresh flowers everywhere and the mirrored walls, while the men were pleased to see their favorite dishes on the club's menu, as well as many of their personal and business friends at the opening. When the Stork Club became a tenant in 1934, the building was known as the Physicians and Surgeons Building. Many of the medical tenants were unhappy about the night club moving in, but in February 1946, Billingsley purchased the seven-story building for $300,000 cash, evicting the doctors to expand the club. (Note: The eight-story building eventually had its banquet and private party rooms on the second floor with other floors containing a complete carpentry shop, the set for the Stork Club television show, business offices for the club and for the Sortilege perfume business, a floor for refrigerators and freezers holding extra provisions if needed, and a floor that was Billingsley's personal suite of offices. He often moved offices and various departments from one floor to another in the building.)

By 1936, the Stork was doing well enough to have a million-dollar gross for the first time. Young debutante Brenda Frazier made her first visit to the Stork Club in the spring of 1938; she became a regular, bringing many young people from the society set with her. Billingsley welcomed young people who were not old enough to drink. He encouraged them to gather at the Stork Club by inviting debutantes to the club and holding a yearly "Glamor Girl" election. In 1941, he selected the North Carolina debutante Betty Cordon as the year's glamour girl. As the father of three daughters, Billingsley kept an eye on the young people, making sure they were not served alcohol and that they were able to have an enjoyable time at the Stork Club without it.

The Stork Club previously provided live entertainment, but after Billingsley realized the reason people came to the club was to watch people, he abandoned the floor shows in favor of giving expensive gifts to regular customers of the club. A live band was provided in the main dining room for dancing. Billingsley had a keen sense for business. Before he purchased the building where the Stork Club was, the yearly rent for the space it occupied was $12,000. Billingsley rented out the hat- and coat-check area to a separate concession for $27,000 a year. This paid the rent for the Stork Club, leaving $15,000 annually to cover bad checks. (Note: After Billingsley had purchased the East 53rd Street building, he managed the hat and coat check room as part of the club.) When Ernest Hemingway wanted to pay his bill with a $100,000 check he received for the movie rights to For Whom the Bell Tolls, Billingsley told him he would be able to cash the check after the club closed at 4:00 am. He kept the Stork Club's name vivid in the minds of his patrons through mailing lists and a club newsletter. Billingsley was also aware of the need for a good working relationship with the press; food and drink for reporters and photographers assigned to cover the Stork Club were on the house.

=== Controversies ===
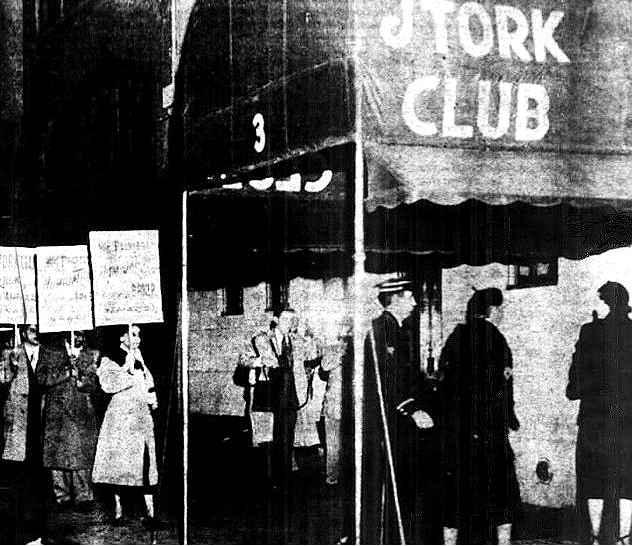
A group of pickets led by Walter White outside the Stork Club following Josephine Baker's accusation of racism. Baker's friend, Bessie Buchanan, who was also a club guest at the time, is among those on the picket line on October 27, 1951.

==== Tax raid ====
In early 1944, New York mayor Fiorello H. La Guardia ordered a check on the books of all major city night clubs. City tax accountants soon investigated the Stork Club, the Copacabana, and other city night spots. By July, auditors turned in a report claiming that the clubs were overcharging patrons on tax, sending the city the proper amount, and keeping the overbilled sums. One Saturday in July, city officials arrived at the Stork Club with a court order granting permission for them to seize the club's property for the amount that was claimed to be overcharged as taxes, plus penalties. The total for the Stork Club was $181,000. Billingsley, out of town with his family, was notified. The club's employees refused to turn anything over to the officials, who were intent on closing it.

Upon his return, Billingsley firmly protested that the Stork Club did not owe the city any money and was up to date on its tax payments. A compromise was reached: the club could stay open as long as a custodian for the city was allowed to be on the premises. Billingsley was eventually able to get a court order to eject the custodian, but the case dragged on for five years, costing Billingsley $100,000.

==== Josephine Baker ====
On October 19, 1951, Josephine Baker made charges of racism against the Stork Club. Baker visited the club on October 16 as the guest of Roger Rico and his wife; both entertainers were at the Stork after their theater performances. Baker said she ordered a steak and was apparently still waiting for it an hour later. The controversy grew when Baker accused Walter Winchell of being in the Cub Room at the time and not coming to her aid. Winchell was at the club; he said he had greeted Baker and vocalist Roger Rico as the two left their Cub Room table. Winchell said he was not aware of there being any problem, and left for a late screening of the film The Desert Fox. The next morning, Winchell's rumored failure to assist Baker was big news, and he received countless telephone calls. The incident blew into a major scandal and was widely publicized on the radio and newspapers. Mrs. Rico, who was part of the Baker party with her husband, said that Baker's steak was waiting for her at the table after she returned from her phone call, but the entertainer chose to make a stormy exit from the Stork anyhow. News accounts show conflicting statements from the Ricos. (Note: Winchell was at the Stork Club with fellow columnist Jack O'Brian and his wife at the time of the incident. When Winchell saw Baker and Rico leave their table, he believed they were going into the main dining room to dance. They were actually going to use the club's pay phone. Neither Winchell nor O'Brian saw anything wrong, and both left for the late The Desert Fox film screening. The club was busy at the time, so everyone was experiencing some slow service. Mrs. Rico said the rest of the party did not order food and it was about two hours before Baker's steak arrived. At that point, her husband became angry and asked for a bill. He was told that there would be none, since this was a celebrity party. Rico, who spoke only French, insisted he had been billed on previous Stork Club visits and threw some money on the table. His party and he then left the Stork Club. Bessie A. Buchanan, an old friend of Baker's, was also a guest of Mr. and Mrs. Rico. Buchanan later picketed the Stork Club over the incident.)

Walter Winchell's name, along with those of Billingsley and the Stork Club, was further tarnished by the incident. After leaving the Stork, the Baker party made contact with WMCA's Barry Gray, where the story was told as part of Gray's radio talk show. One of those who phoned Gray's program was television personality and columnist Ed Sullivan, a professional rival of Winchell's whose "home base" was the El Morocco nightclub. Sullivan's on-air remarks dealt mainly with Winchell's alleged part in the event, saying, "What Winchell has done is an insult to the United States and American newspapermen." Winchell's column of October 24, 1951, provides the same details as earlier news stories about Josephine Baker's accusations that he did not assist her at the Stork Club. Winchell also printed a letter he received from Walter White, who was the executive secretary for the National Association for the Advancement of Colored People (NAACP) at the time, although Billingsley alleged the letter was a forgery.

The controversy prompted a fake bomb threat, as well as an NAACP protest outside the Stork Club. A New York police investigation of the matter followed the complaint made by the NAACP. The police investigation found that the Stork Club did not discriminate against Josephine Baker. The NAACP went on to say that the results of the police investigation did not provide enough evidence for the organization to pursue the incident further in criminal court. Baker filed suit against Winchell over the matter, but the suit was dismissed in 1955. Walter Winchell later said. "The Stork Club discriminates against everybody. White, black, and pink. The Stork bars all kinds of people for all kinds of reasons. But if your skin is green and you're rich and famous or you're syndicated, you'll be welcome at the club."

==== Bugging rumor ====
Because of Billingsley's long-standing friendship with Federal Bureau of Investigation (FBI) head J. Edgar Hoover, rumors persisted that the Stork Club was bugged. During his work on the Stork Club book, author and New York Times reporter Ralph Blumenthal was contacted by Jean-Claude Baker, one of Josephine Baker's adopted sons. Having read an article by Blumenthal about Leonard Bernstein's FBI file, he indicated that he had read his mother's FBI file and by comparing the file to the tapes, said he thought the Stork Club incident was overblown.

=== Union issues and closure ===
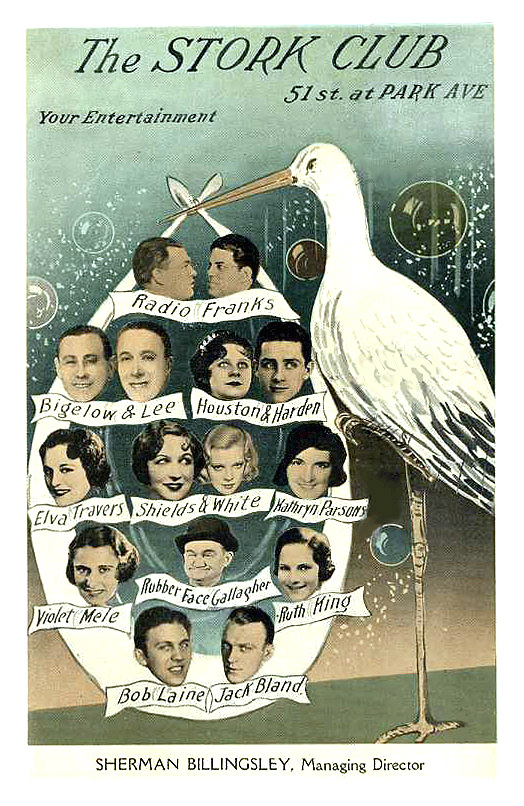
Postcard sent by the club when it was on East 51st Street and still had live entertainment

Hard times began for the Stork Club in 1956, when it lost money for the first time. In 1957, unions tried once again to organize the club's employees. Their major effort 10 years before had been unsuccessful; at that time, Sherman Billingsley was accused of attempting to influence his employees to stay out of the union with lavish staff parties and financial gifts. By 1957, all other similar New York clubs except the Stork Club were unionized. This met with resistance from Billingsley and many dependable employees left the Stork Club over his refusal to allow them to be represented by a union. (Note: Billingsley's initial resistance to allowing a union to represent his employees was based on the union being linked to organized crime. Billingsley's earlier experiences with the mob made him especially wary. Later on, his refusal to accept a union at the Stork Club was based on the thought that he would have a smaller margin of profit with unionized employees.) Picket lines were set up and marched in front of the club daily for years, including the club's last day of business. The club received many threats connected to his refusal to accept unions for his workers; some of the threats involved Billingsley's family. In 1957, he was arrested for displaying a gun when some painters who were working at the Austrian Consulate next to the family's home sat on his stoop for lunch. Billingsley admitted to acting rashly because of the threats. Three months before his arrest, his secretary was assaulted as she was entering the building where she lived; her assailants made references to the union issues at the Stork Club.

As a result of the union dispute, many club patrons no longer visited the night spot. Those who were performers were informed of the possibility of fines and suspensions by their respective unions for crossing the Stork Club picket line as the issue continued. Many of Billingsley's friendships, including those of Walter Winchell and J. Edgar Hoover, were over as a result of the union problems. He began firing staff without good cause. As the dispute dragged on, a live band was also no longer in the dining room for music; members of the Musicians' Union had crossed the picket line to perform for some time. (Note: In a 1974 column, Jack O'Brian wondered why the band members, who were members of the Musicians' Union, were willing to cross the picket lines for such a long period of time.) Previously, the club had no need for advertising; it was mentioned frequently in print and word of mouth without it. In 1963, the club offered a hamburger and French fries for $1.99 in a New York Times advertisement; when those in the know about the club saw it, they realized the Stork Club's days were coming to an end. In the last few months of its operation, at times, only three customers came in for the entire evening. On a good day in the mid-1940s, some 2,500 people visited the club.

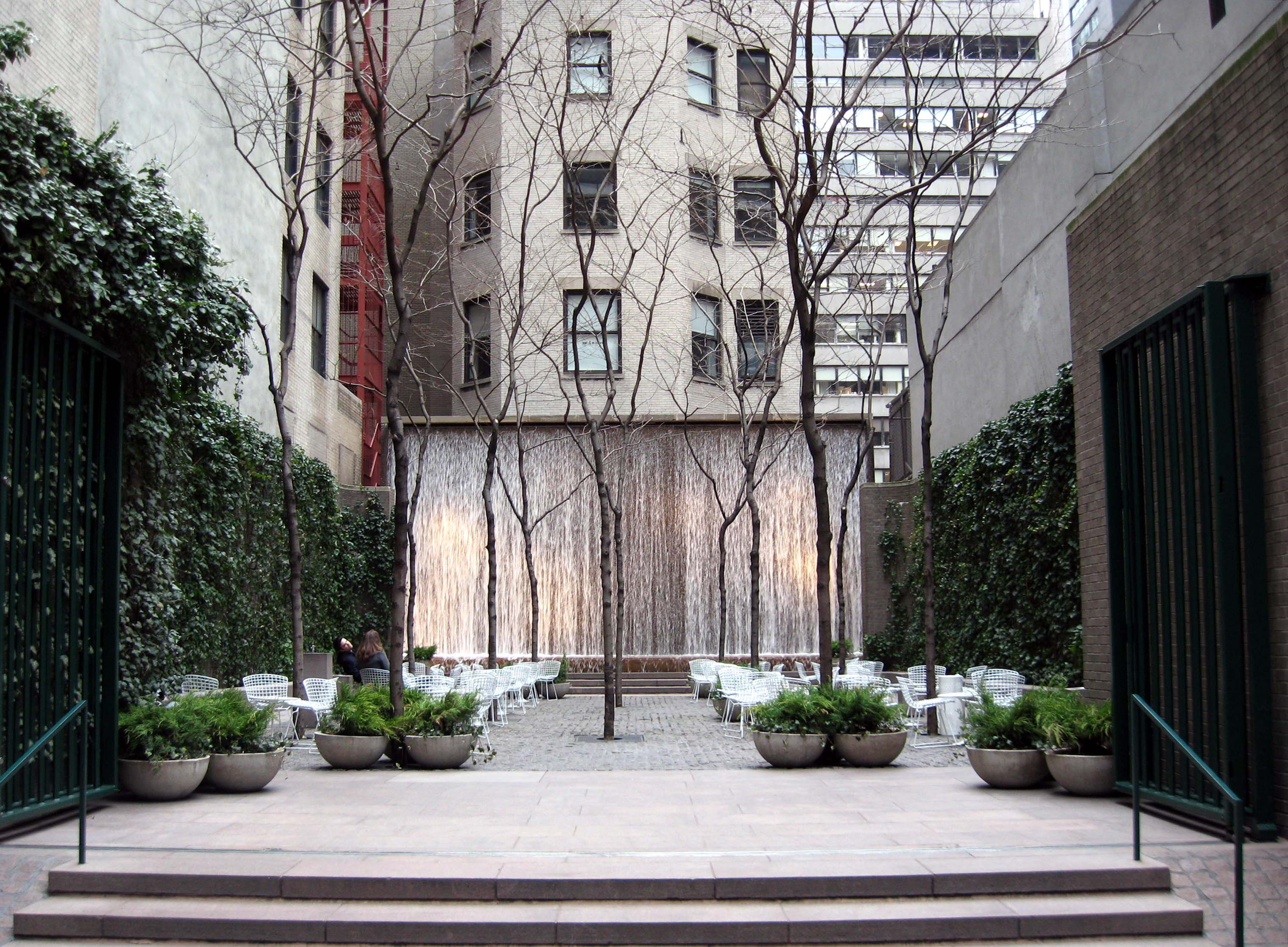
Paley Park replaced the Stork Club in 1967.

When the Stork Club initially closed its doors, news stories indicated it was being shut because the building it occupied had been sold and a new location was being sought. (Note: The club did its last business on Saturday, October 2, 1965, and did not reopen. A sign was not placed on the door until October 5, indicating the closure of the club and a new location for it was being sought.) The years of labor disputes had taken their toll on Billingsley financially. Trying to keep the Stork Club going took all of his assets and about $10 million from his three daughters' trust funds. While in the hospital recuperating from a serious illness in October 1965, Billingsley sold the building to Columbia Broadcasting System (CBS), which turned the site into a park named after its founder's father. In a 1937 interview, Billingsley said, "I hope I'll be running a night club the last day I live." On October 4, 1966, Sherman Billingsley died of a heart attack at his Manhattan apartment. (Note: The actress Barbara Billingsley was once married to Sherman Billingsley's nephew, Glenn.) He was planning on re-opening the Stork Club at another location and was working on writing a book at the time of his death.

== Interior ==
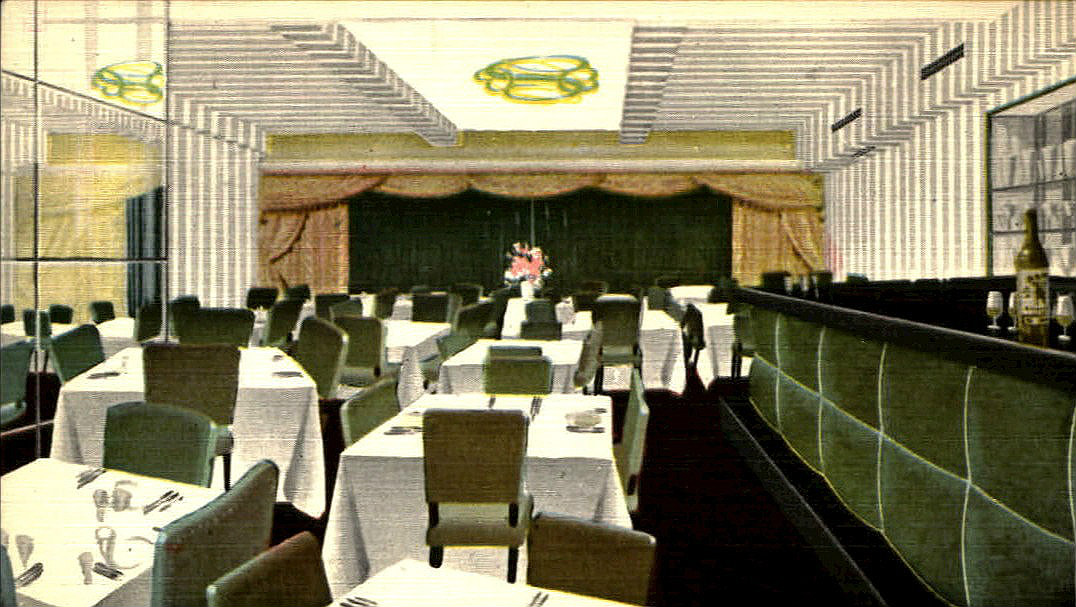
Postcard illustrating the "Blessed Event" room for private parties

From the physical layout of the club, as described by Ed Sullivan in a 1939 column, the Stork should have been doomed to failure, since it was strangely shaped and far from roomy in places. The club's ladies' room was on the second floor of the structure and the men's room was on the third; only the dining room, bar, and later the Cub Room were on the first floor. Despite this, the club could hold 1,000 guests. A feature of the club was a solid 14-karat gold chain at its entrance; patrons were allowed entry through it by the doorman. When the East 53rd Street building came down to make way for Paley Park, one of the artifacts found in it was a still. The New York Historical Society displayed that along with other Stork Club items and memorabilia in an exhibit in 2000.

Billingsley's hospitality with food, drink, and gifts overcame the structural deficits to keep his patrons returning time after time. He maintained order through a series of hand signals; without saying a word he could order complimentary drinks and gifts for a party at any given table. Billingsley was also able to summon the club's private limousine to whisk favored customers away to a theater date or a ballgame after drinks or dining at the Stork. He changed the meaning of the hand signals frequently to avoid regular patrons' being able to read them. Guests dined on the finest wines and cuisine, and it was known for its Champagne and caviar. The club gained worldwide attention for its cocktails, made by chief barman Nathaniel "Cookie" Cook, who invented dozens of cocktails at the bar, including the signature "Stork Club Cocktail". The ornamental bar of the Stork Club was subsequently relocated to Jim Brady's Bar on Maiden Lane, which acquired the bar at auction in the mid-1970s and continued to operate until the COVID-19 pandemic in 2020. The dining room featured live bands for dancing; the Benny Goodman orchestra were frequent performers. According to a 1960 Services Labor Report, the kitchen and dining room employees working in the Stork Club did "not enjoy the same wages, hours and working conditions" as the others, a primary factor which led the majority of them to the strike in January 1957.

Besides the Cub Room, the Main Dining Room, and the bar, the club contained a room for parties, the "Blessed Event Room", a large private room on the second floor with its own kitchen and bar, the "Loner's Room", which was just past the Cub Room and much like a men's club, and a private barber shop. When the Blessed Event Room was added to the Stork Club, its walls were entirely mirrored. Patrons who had rented the room for poker parties complained that the mirrors allowed players to see everyone's hand of cards; the mirrors were then removed from the walls.

=== The Cub Room ===
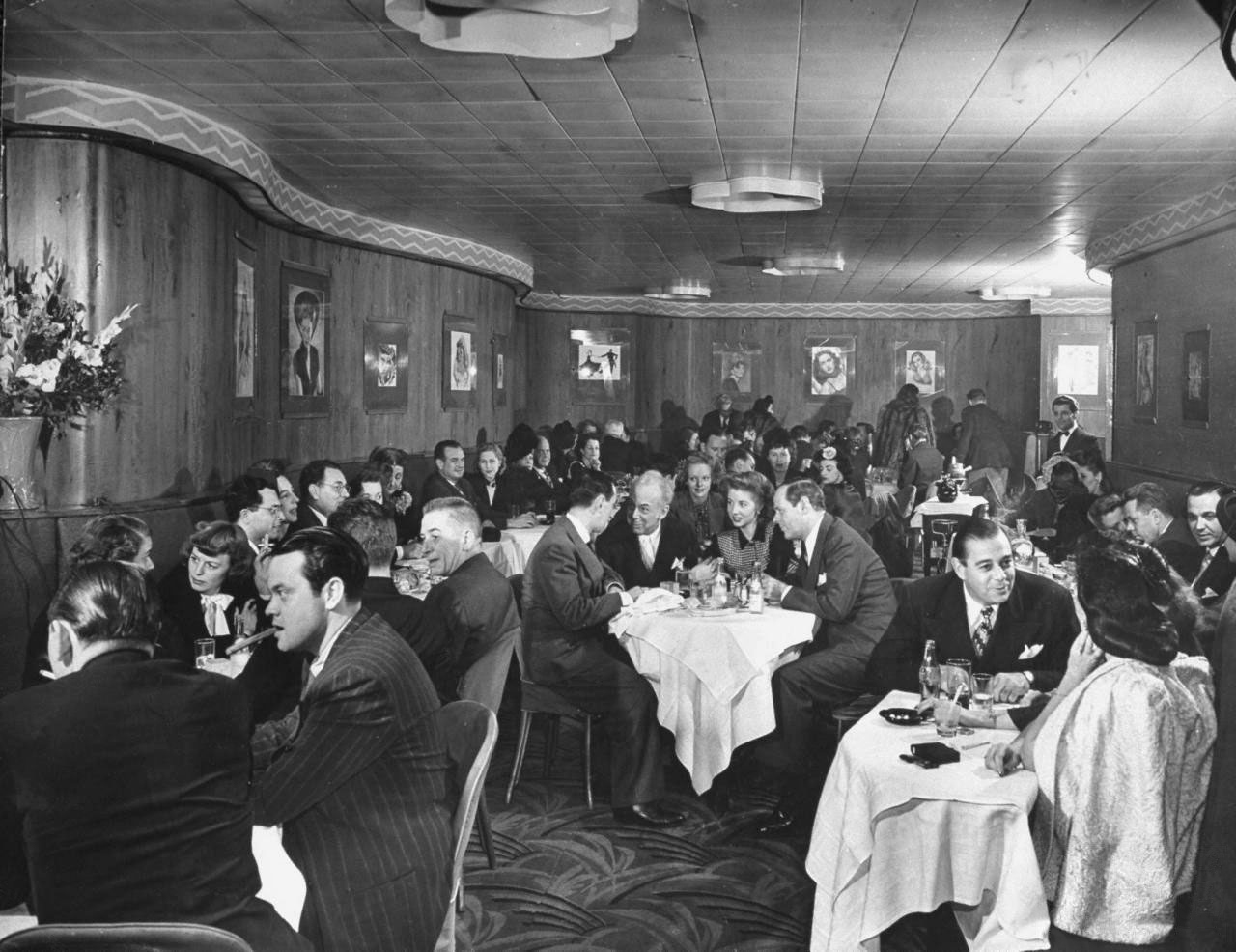
Stork Club's Cub Room, November 1944. From left-Orson Welles (with cigar), Margaret Sullavan with husband, owner Sherman Billingsley (center table at far right), Morton Downey (at right).

Billingsley's original plan for the Cub Room was for it to be a private place for playing gin rummy with his friends. (Note: Billingsley told some friends he had built the room as a private place for Ethel Merman after her theater performances; he told others he built it while trying to get over her after their affair had ended.) The room was added to the club during World War II. Billingsley broke out a wall in the bar to create this private space, but it was Walter Winchell who began to call it the Cub Room. The Cub Room had no windows and was described in a Louis Sobol column as a "lopsided oval". The room was lit with pink tones. On the wood-paneled walls were paintings of beautiful women; Billingsley also had similar portraits by the same artist in the ladies' powder room. (Note: "Beautiful women are the only decoration worth a damn in a night club."-Sherman Billingsley) After the club's labor problems began in 1957, Billingsley redecorated the entire club, choosing emerald green for the carpet and chairs, and a pinkish-red for the banquettes. The Cub Room's wood panels were replaced by beige burlap and the portraits of beautiful women were replaced by paintings of noted 19th-century race horses. As a concession to those who wanted to have a business lunch at The Stork, the Cub Room was for men only during lunch time. (Note: During World War II, many military commanders visited the Stork Club and held strategic planning sessions there. The men would often sketch battle plans on the club's tablecloths. These tablecloths were not sent to the club's laundry but were disposed of due to their potentially sensitive nature.) The sanctum sanctorum, the Cub Room ("the snub room"), was guarded by a captain called "Saint Peter" (for the saint who guards the gates of Heaven).

The most famous of the Cub Room's headwaiters was John "Jack" Spooner, who was well known to many celebrities from his previous duties at LaHiff's. Billingsley recruited him in 1934 after the death of Billy Lahiff and the subsequent closure of his club. Spooner began an autograph book for his daughter, Amelia, while working at LaHiff's. Billingsley encouraged him to bring "The Book" to the Stork Club, where stars continued to sign it. Some who were famous illustrators or cartoonists such as E. C. Segar (Popeye), Chic Young (Blondie), and Theodor Geisel ("Dr. Seuss") would add personalized doodles or drawings for Spooner's young daughter. Billingsley's rule of thumb for his help, "If you know them, they don't belong in here," did not apply to Spooner. It was Spooner's knowing the patrons and socializing with them away from the job that helped make the Stork Club so successful with attracting celebrity clients. At Christmas, Spooner dressed as Santa Claus, posing for photos with old and young alike.

== Clientele and image ==
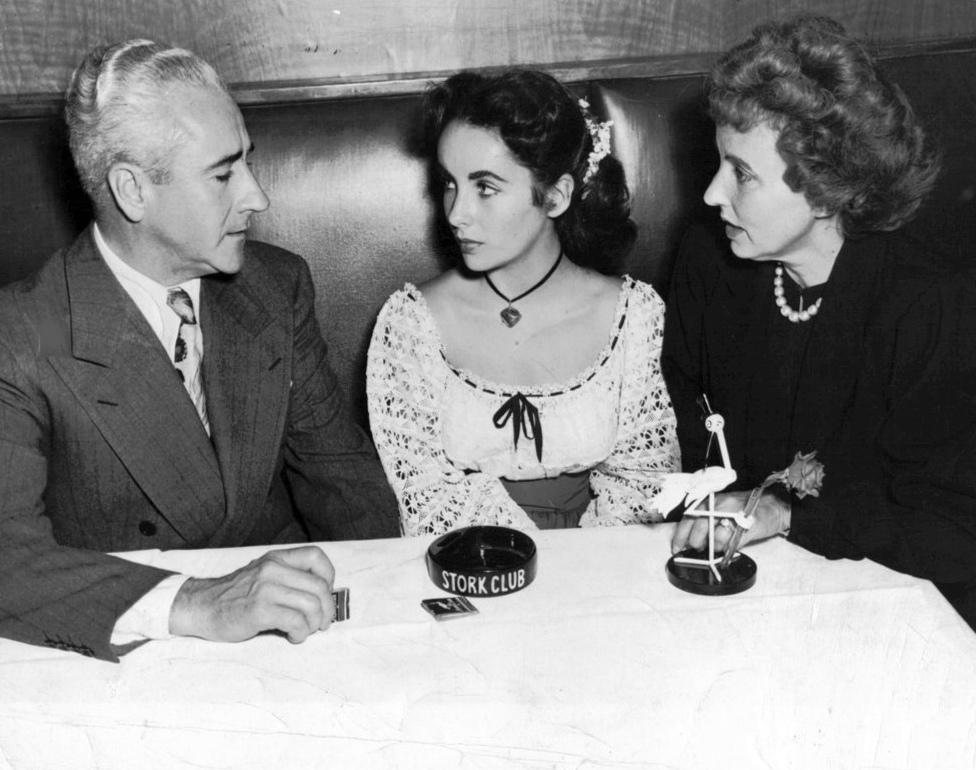
Elizabeth Taylor (aged 15–16) and her parents at the Stork Club in 1947

Author T. C. McNult has referred to the Stork Club during its existence as "the most celebrated nightspot in the world"; while author Ed McMahon has called it the "most realistic nightclub of all", a name "synonymous with fame, class, and money, in no particular order". Society writer Lucius Beebe wrote in 1946: "To millions and millions of people all of over the world the Stork symbolizes and epitomizes the de luxe upholstery of quintessentially urban existence. It means fame; it means wealth; it means an elegant way of life among celebrated folk". The club was a prime example of the flourishing cafe society at the time, but the real purpose of the Stork Club, according to journalist Ed Sullivan, was people watching other people, particularly non-celebrities watching celebrities. Author Mearl L. Allen, however, highlights that the club was more than a celebrity playground, and that "many decisions of tremendous social and economic importance regarding world affairs were made in the Stork Club during this time", and the likes of Desi Arnaz and Lucille Ball could often be seen conversing with executive types. Mark Bernardo, author of Mad Men's Manhattan: The Insider's Guide, has said: "In some ways, the Stork Club was ahead of its time—courting celebrities by picking up their tabs, hiring a house photographer who sent candid shots of guests to the tabloids, and offering a private enclave called the Cub Room, where stars could huddle away from the prying eyes of fans, all hallmarks of modern clubs that cater to boldface names". The venue was usually packed with luminaries during its golden years, and dining orders could take a long time to be dealt with.

Notable guests through the years included Lucille Ball, Tallulah Bankhead, Joan Blondell, Charlie Chaplin, Frank Costello, Bing Crosby, the Duke and Duchess of Windsor, Brenda Frazier, Ava Gardner, Artie Shaw, Dorothy Frooks, Carmen Miranda, Dana Andrews, Michael O'Shea, Judy Garland, the Harrimans, Ernest Hemingway, Judy Holliday, J. Edgar Hoover, Grace Kelly, the Kennedys, Dorothy Kilgallen, Dorothy Lamour, Robert M. McBride, Vincent Price, Marilyn Monroe, the Nordstrom Sisters, Erik Rhodes, the Roosevelts, Elaine Stritch, Ramón Rivero, J. D. Salinger, Frank Sinatra, Elizabeth Taylor, Gene Tierney, Mike Todd, and Gloria Vanderbilt.

The main room of the club was also frequented by many of the prominent figures that had fled Europe, from royals to businessmen, debutantes, sportsmen and military dignitaries, who often, upon departing, took with them the signature ashtrays of the club as souvenirs. The news of Grace Kelly's engagement to Prince Rainier of Monaco broke at the Stork. The couple was at the club on Tuesday, January 3, 1956, as the rumors flew. Veteran columnist Jack O'Brian passed Kelly a note, saying that reliable sources indicated she was about to become engaged to the Prince. Kelly replied she could not answer the question posed by O'Brian until Friday. Socialite Evalyn Walsh McLean, owner of the Hope Diamond, wore the gem as if it was costume jewelry. It disappeared at the Stork Club one night during McLean's visit there. Actress Beatrice Lillie found it under one of the club's tables. Actor Warren Oates once worked at the club as a dishwasher.

=== Conduct ===
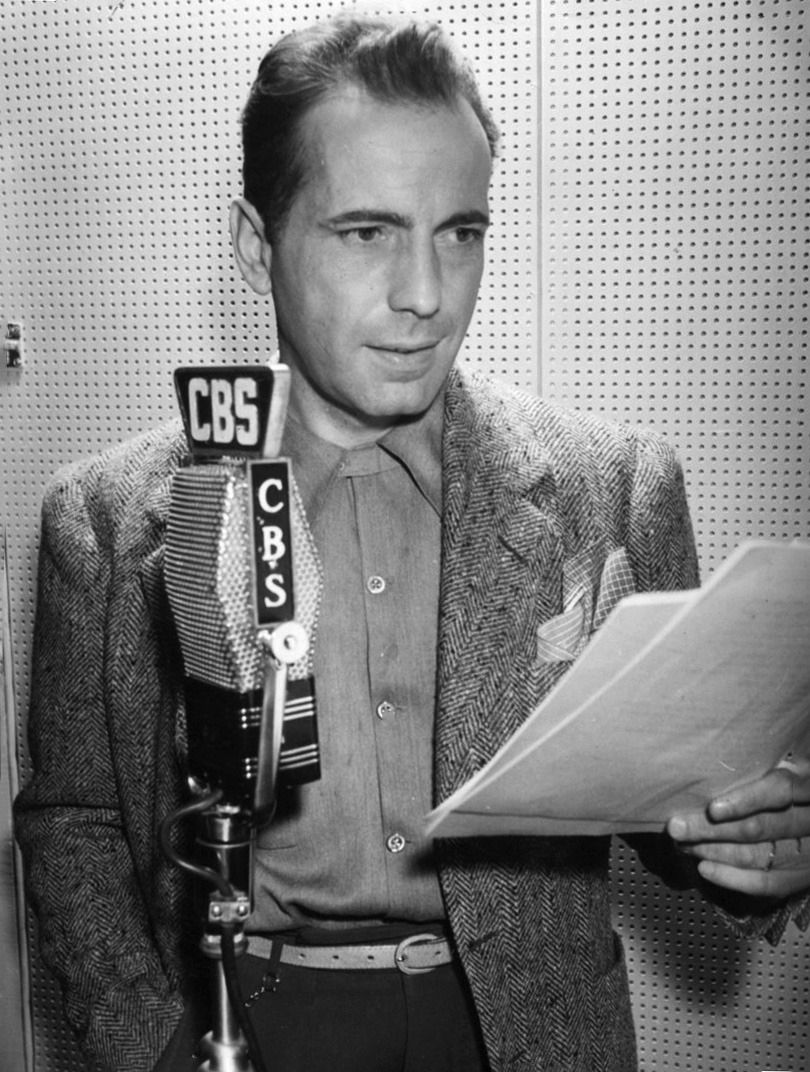
Humphrey Bogart was banned from the club after a heated argument with Billingsley.

Guests were expected to dress to high standards, with men wearing evening suits and the women wearing "gowns with silk gloves reaching the elbow". All women in full evening dress received an orchid or gardenia corsage, compliments of the Stork Club. A requirement for all men was a necktie; those who were not wearing one were either lent one or had to buy one to gain admittance. Although African Americans were not explicitly barred from entry, there was a mutual understanding that they were not welcome. Billingsley insisted on orderly conduct for all of his Stork Club guests; fighting, drunkenness, or rowdiness were prohibited. He ran the club on the principle of it being a place where people could have a good time and that it was somewhere he could bring his own family without worrying that they would see or hear something he did not want them to. Billingsley closely controlled the seating placement system in the club. Unescorted women were not allowed to enter the club after 6:00 p.m; this was a protective measure for men who may have been out with someone other than their wives.

Several celebrities did not abide by the rules and were banned from the club. Humphrey Bogart was banned after a prolonged "shouting match" with Billingsley. Milton Berle was officially barred for too much table-hopping, shouting, and doing handsprings in the club; Berle contended that the real reason was because of a Stork Club satire he had recently performed on his television program. Elliott Roosevelt, the so-called "black sheep of the club", became unwelcome at the club through an apparent misunderstanding. Billingsley had planned an engagement party for Roosevelt and his girlfriend, vocalist Gigi Durston, on the basis of the couple's friends' statements that they were going to be married. Durston had once worked at the Stork Club as a singer and Roosevelt was a longtime customer of the club. Billingsley sent out publicity notices about the party; the couple told him that they had no plans to announce their engagement at that time. Roosevelt was banned from the Stork and the party was canceled. Jackie Gleason, who was a frequent guest of the club with his two daughters, was being seated with a female companion when the couple was asked to leave the premises in March 1957. Billingsley claimed that Gleason's conversation became loud and off-color when he arrived at a table and barred Gleason from the Stork Club for life. Gleason said that he had done nothing wrong. He wondered if the problem was because he was a member of the Musicians' Union, since the club's wait and kitchen staff had been on strike since January of that year.

Despite the rules and banishments, there were incidents which made their way into newspapers. Billingsley associate Steve Hannagan believed that one "good fight" a year was permissible for a respectable night club. Johnny Weissmuller accused a Navy lieutenant of using a lit cigarette to burn the clothing of dancers as they passed his table. The lieutenant advised Weissmuller to get a haircut; his wife told Weissmuller to go back to Hollywood with the other ape-men. The Navy man suffered two black eyes and complained that Weissmuller's friends held him as he was punched by Weissmuller. Ernest Hemingway once took issue with a stranger who slapped him on the back; knocking him into three chairs and a table as he brushed him away. Billingsley contended that many of the incidents that appeared in print were minor disagreements which were inflated by the press.

Jack Benny invited longtime friend, writer, and performer Goodman Ace to lunch with him at the Stork. Ace arrived at the club first and received the "cold shoulder" because he was not recognized by the staff. When Benny arrived and asked for Ace, he was told that Ace became tired of waiting and left. Soon Ace began to receive mail from the Stork, which he proceeded to answer in his tongue in cheek style. Ace's response to the message about the club having wonderful air conditioning was that after having received the cold shoulder there, he was well aware of the climate. Bilingsley responded to Ace with a gift of some Stork Club bow ties. Ace then asked for some matching socks so he might be in style to be turned away again. Ace and his wife became regulars at the club after the issue was resolved.

=== Stork Club gifts ===
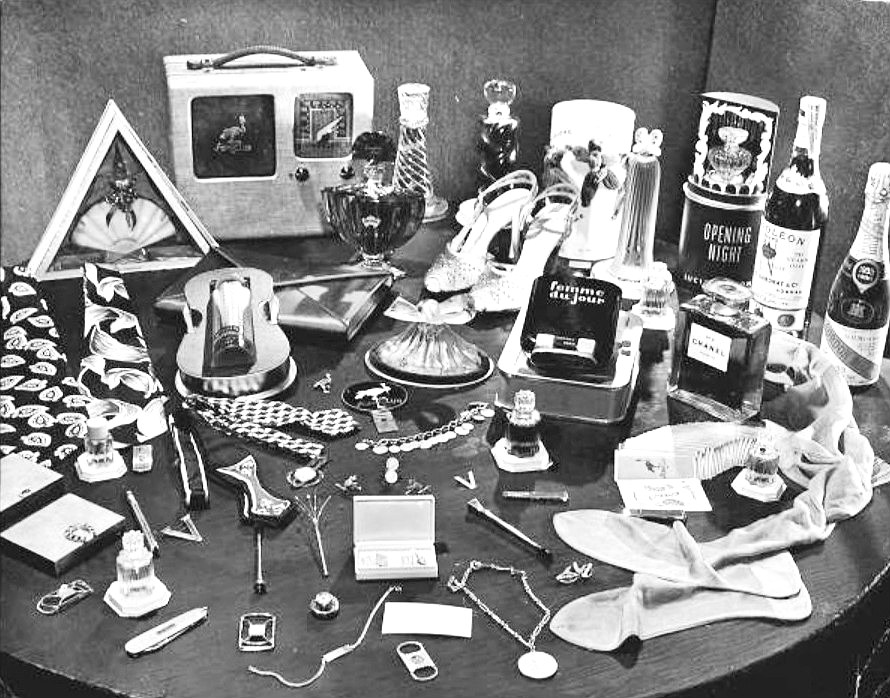
Some of the gifts given to Stork Club patrons in 1944

Owner Billingsley was well known for his extravagant gifts presented to his favorite patrons, spending an average of $100,000 a year on them. They included compacts studded with diamonds and rubies, French perfumes, Champagne and liquor, and even automobiles. Many of the gifts were specially made for the Stork Club, with the club's name and logo on them. Some of the best known examples were the gifts of Sortilège perfume by Le Galion, which became known as the "fragrance of the Stork Club". Billingsley convinced Arthur Godfrey, Morton Downey, and his own assistant, Steve Hannigan, to form an investment group with him to obtain the United States distributorship of the fragrance. The partners expanded into the sale of soap, cosmetics and other sundries under the Stork Club name. They called the business Cigogne—the French word for stork; the line was carried by various drug and department stores in the United States. (Note: The Duchess of Windsor, a regular club patron when in New York, named the club's soaps "nude". The bars had cameos of Morton Downey, Billingsley, or Arthur Godfrey on one side, and the club logo on the other.) Every female guest of the club received a small vial of perfume and a tube of Stork Club lipstick as souvenirs of her visit. It was also Billingsley's standard practice to send every regular club patron a case of Champagne at Christmas.

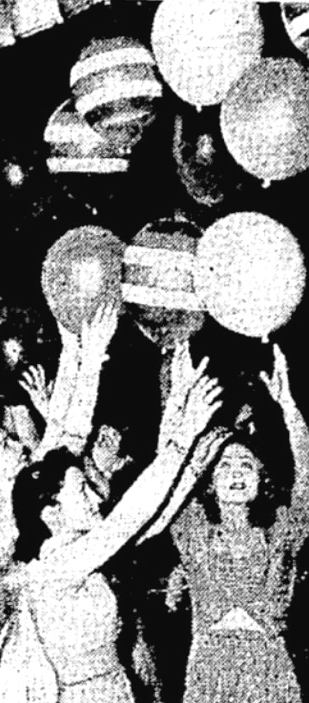
Women guests at one of the Stork Club's weekly Balloon Nights (1941)

Sunday night was "Balloon Night". As is common with New Year's celebrations, balloons were held on the ceiling of the Main Dining Room by a net and the net would open at the stroke of midnight. As the balloons came down, the ladies would begin frantically trying to catch them. Each contained a number and a drawing would be held for the prizes, which ranged from charms for bracelets to automobiles; there were also at least three $100 bills folded and placed randomly in the balloons. (Note: During World War II, the $100 bills were replaced with $100 War Bonds.)

Billingsley's generosity was not confined to those who were always at the club. He received the following letter in 1955: "I am grateful to you for your thoughtful kindness in sending me such a generous selection of attractive neckties. At the same time may I once again thank you for the cigars that you regularly send to the White House." It was signed by Dwight D. Eisenhower. During World War II, three bomber planes were christened with the name of the Stork Club. Billingsley commissioned Tiffany & Co. to produce sterling silver Stork Club logo Victory pins as gifts for their crew members. Patrons were not always on the receiving end; Billingsley's writings claimed that one of his waiters received a $20,000 tip. A bartender received a new Cadillac from a grateful patron, and a headwaiter received a $10,000 tip from tennis star Fred Perry. It was necessary for Billingsley to give the expensive gifts and to provide some or all of a celebrity's Stork Club services for free to bring the stars to the club and keep them coming back. The notables were what brought people from all over the country in all walks of life to visit the Stork Club.

== In popular culture ==
Billingley hosted the television series The Stork Club, in which he circulated among the tables, interviewing guests at the club. Originally sponsored by Fatima cigarettes, the series ran from 1950 to 1955. The show was directed by Yul Brynner, who was a television director before he became a well-known actor. The program began on CBS Television with the network having built a replica of the Cub Room on the Stork Club's sixth floor to serve as the set for the show. Billingsley was paid $12,000 each week as its host, but he was never really comfortable on camera and it was noticeable. The television show moved to ABC by 1955. During the broadcast of May 8, 1955, Billingsley made some remarks about fellow New York restaurateur Bernard "Toots" Shor's financial solvency and honesty. Shor responded by suing for a million dollars. He collected just under $50,000 as a settlement in March 1959. The Stork Club television show ended in the same year the statements were made.

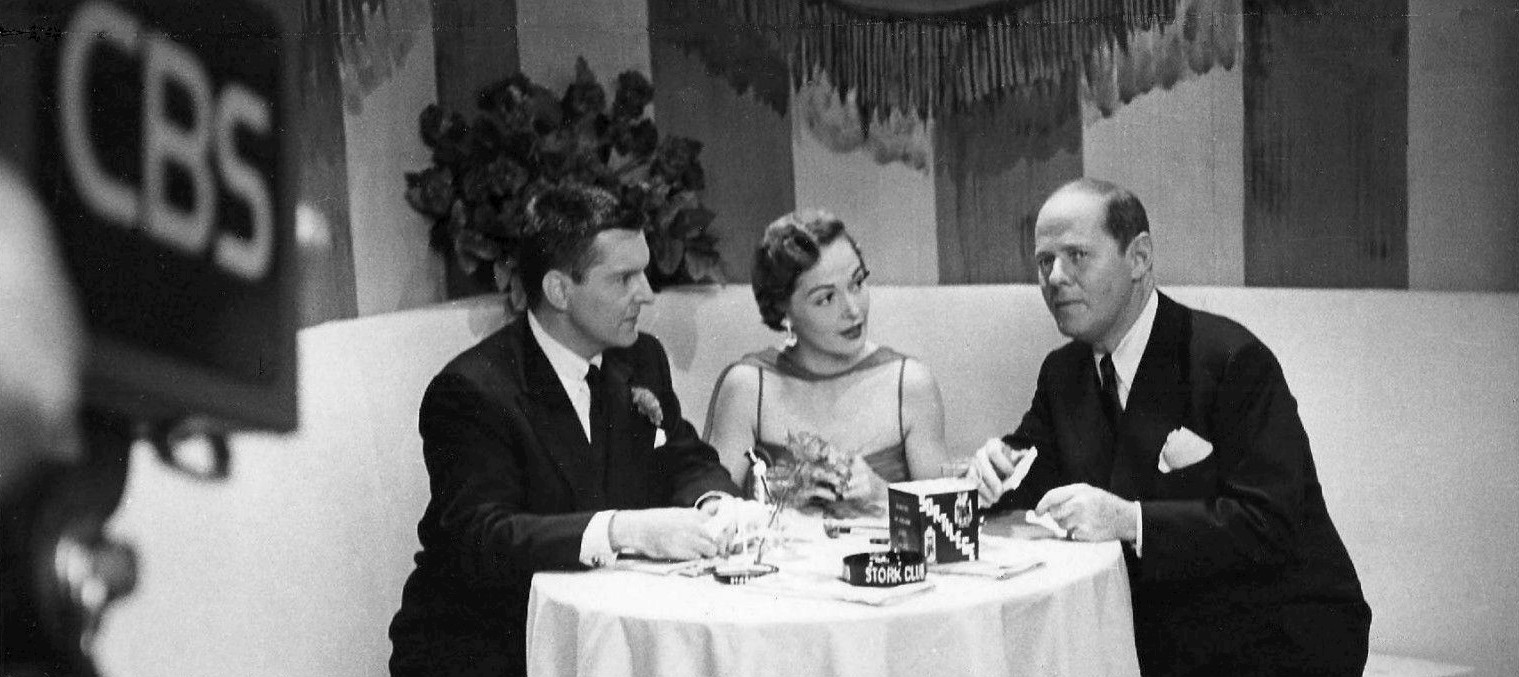
Promotional photo for the premiere of the television program. Peter Lind Hayes and Mary Healy served as co-hosts (June 27, 1950).

A Philco Television Playhouse presentation, "Murder at the Stork Club", was aired on NBC television on January 15, 1950. Franchot Tone and Billingsley had cameo roles in the television drama. The television show was an adaptation of Vera Caspary's 1946 mystery novel, The Murder in the Stork Club, where the action took place in and around the famous nightclub, with Sherman Billingsley and other real-life characters appearing in the plot.

The Stork Club was also featured in several movies, including The Stork Club (1945), Executive Suite (1954), Artists and Models (1955), and My Favorite Year (1982). Billingsley received $100,000 for the use of the club's name in the 1945 film. In All About Eve (1950), the characters played by Bette Davis, Gary Merrill, Anne Baxter and George Sanders are shown in the Cub Room of the Stork Club. The Alfred Hitchcock film The Wrong Man (1957) starred Henry Fonda as real-life Stork Club bassist Christopher Emanuel Balestrero ("Manny"), who was falsely accused of committing robberies around New York City. Scenes involving Balestrero playing the bass were actually shot at the club. The film's screenplay, written by Maxwell Anderson, was based on a true story originally published in Life. (Note: Hitchcock, who produced and directed the film, was one of the Stork Club's regular guests.)

== See also ==
- List of restaurants in New York City
