= Alice Throckmorton McLean =

American civic leader

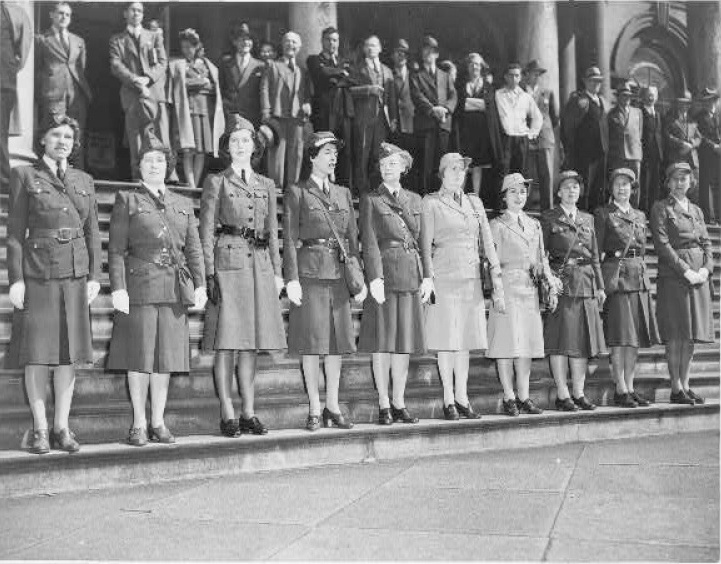
- American Women's Voluntary Services members in uniform, 1942
- Born: March 8, 1886; New York City
- Died: October 25, 1968 (aged 82); Baltimore, Maryland
- Occupation: Social service organizer
- Known for: Founding American Women's Voluntary Services
- Spouse: Edward Tinker
- Children: Two sons
- Parents: James McLean (father); Sara Throckmorton (mother)

Alice Throckmorton McLean (1886–1968) was an American civic leader and founder of the American Women's Voluntary Services (AWVS) before the start of World War II.

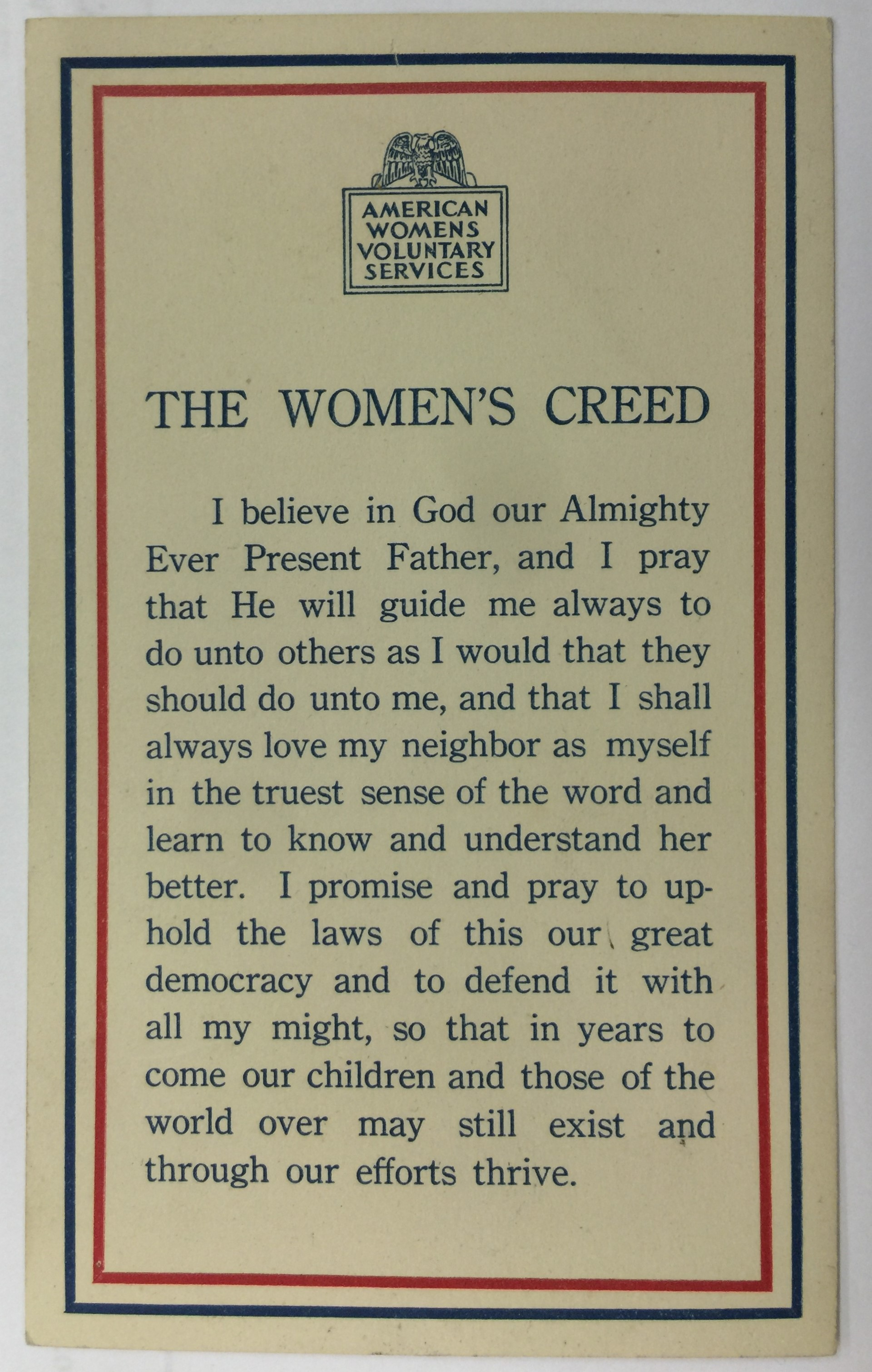
AWVS prayer card.

== Life ==
Alice Throckmorton McLean was born March 8, 1886, in New York City. She was the youngest of three daughters born to American millionaire, James McLean, and Sara Throckmorton. In 1919, after a brief marriage to Edward Tinker, Alice Tinker took back her maiden name and also legally changed her sons’ surnames to McLean.

=== AWVS founding ===
Alice McLean founded AWVS in January 1940, headquartered in New York, 23 months before the United States entered the war, and modeled it after the successful Royal Voluntary Service, which was helping Great Britain in its war efforts. McLean recruited wealthy women who shared a global vision to help her establish the service.

The main goal Maclean's organization was to prepare the nation for the coming war and to provide material support afterward, aid, assistance and information, to both the American armed forces and civilians during World War II. When the bombing of Pearl Harbor occurred, officially beginning the World War II effort for the United States, the AWVS had more than 18,000 members. They were formally trained in many skills including ambulance driving, fire fighting, evacuation procedures, mobile-kitchen operation, first aid, and other emergency services. In addition, McLean founded the National Clothing Conservation Program to address wartime fabric shortages (1944).

During World War II, McLean remained the president of the AWVS. One of its missions was to help finance the war by selling war bonds and stamps. It's estimated that AWVS members successfully raise more than $1 billion for the war effort. By 1942, total membership had reached 250,000 women in 595 units in 30 states. By 1945, membership had grown to 325,000 women, and more than 200 junior auxiliary groups had enlisted 32,000 teenagers.

=== Women of color ===
When creating AWVS, McLean indicated that all women were welcome to join "regardless of race, color or creed." Women of color (including Black, Asian and Hispanic ethnicities) in New York State were the first to join AWVS ranks and were soon followed by women joining units in Beaumont and Galveston, Texas, Hollywood, California, Omaha, Nebraska and Pittsburgh, Pennsylvania, among others.

These AWVS members took classes in Morse code, first aid, map reading, nutrition, war photography, child care, and public speaking. In volunteer workshops, members knitted sweaters and caps and made blankets and children's clothing that was distributed to underprivileged members of their community. Each unit also included a Junior Auxiliary with girls from 14 to 18 whose work included a messenger service, nursing and taking training other courses. In New York, junior members were trained with the Red Cross Drive for Nurses' Aides and worked Harlem Hospital as volunteers.

On May 26, 1942, two women of color were elected to the national AWVS board of directors. Both Dr. Mary McLeod Bethune and Mrs. T. Arnold Hill had already served in leadership positions in New York.

=== Wartime assembly ===
On October 13, 1946, the International Assembly of Women, was held in a small upstate New York town of South Kortright where McLean lived. During the 10-day conference there, Eleanor Roosevelt joined McLean and about 200 female delegates from more than 50 different nations to discuss the political, economic and social issues in hopes of bringing peace to the world.

=== Last years ===
Because the organization did not receive substantial support from the federal government, McLean spent much of her personal fortune to keep the AWVS financially viable.

In 1944, McLean moved from her New York City home to her estate in South Kortright and lived there until the war's end in 1948. Then she moved to live with one of her sons in Baltimore. She donated her estate in New York to a foundation that was helping European children displaced in the war.

McLean died October 25, 1968, at the age of 82 in Baltimore, Maryland. At that time, the AWVS was still in existence.

== See also ==
- United States home front during World War II § Volunteer activities
