= Sherman Billingsley =

Bootlegger, restaurateur

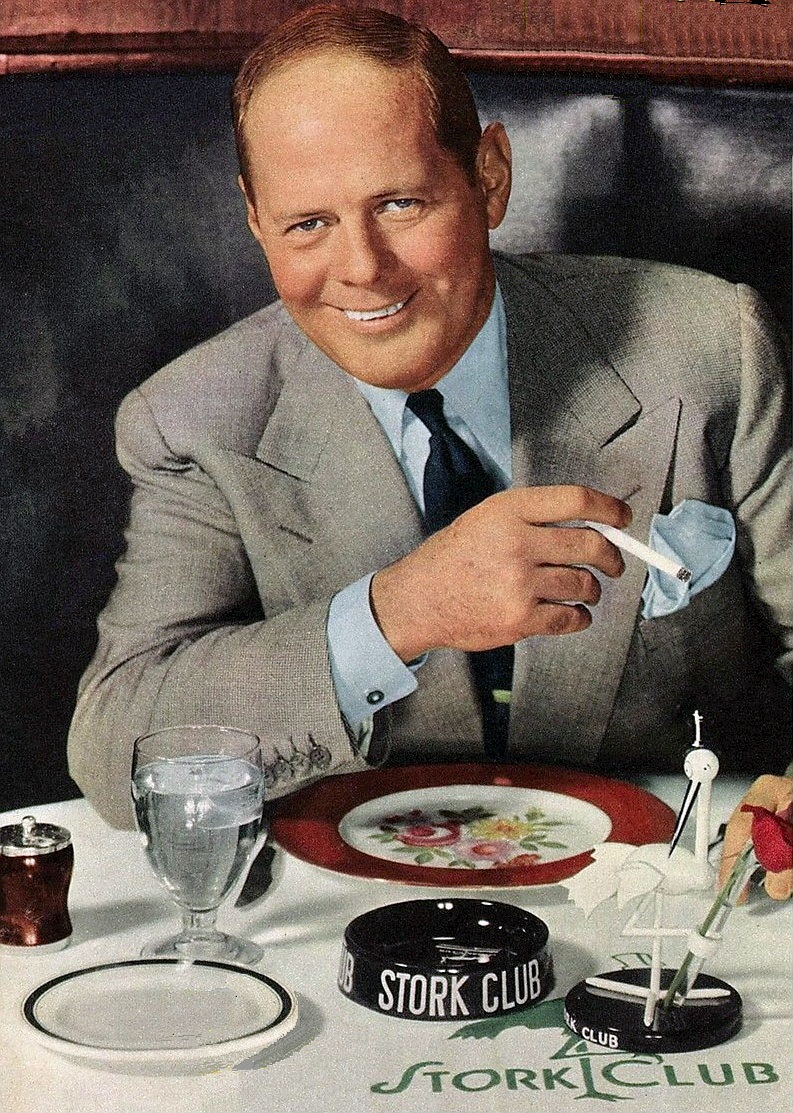
- Billingsley in 1951
- Born: March 10, 1896; Enid, Oklahoma, U.S.
- Died: October 4, 1966 (aged 70); New York City, U.S.
- Occupation: Owner of The Stork Club in New York City

John Sherman Billingsley (March 10, 1896 – October 4, 1966) was an American nightclub owner and former bootlegger who was the founder and owner of New York's Stork Club.

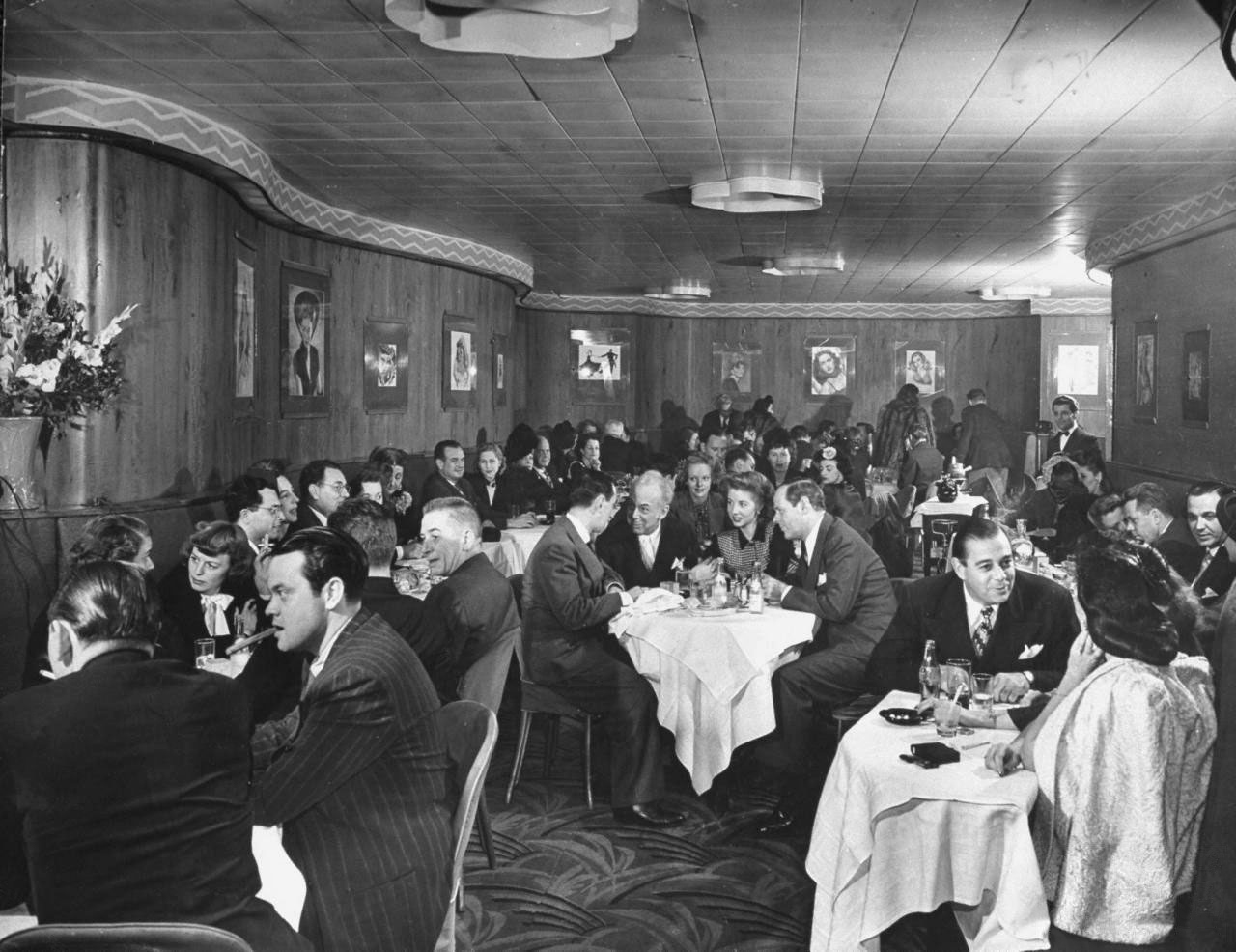
Billingsley (center table right) among the celebrities in the Stork Club's Cub Room (November 1944)

== Life and career ==
John Sherman Billingsley was the youngest child of Robert Billingsley and Emily Collingsworth. He was born in Enid, Oklahoma, on March 10, 1896. In later years, Billingsley said he was born in 1900, but this is refuted by both the 1930 census and the Social Security Death Index. His parents had settled in Enid following the 1893 land run. The Billingsley children attended school in a one-room schoolhouse, riding a horse to get to school. When an older brother committed a homicide and was sent to prison, the family relocated to Anadarko to be near him. Upon the brother's release, he enlisted Sherman as an assistant in his bootlegging business.

The family moved again, this time to Oklahoma City, where Sherman was again drawn into the bootlegging business by another of his older brothers. This business extended into Omaha, Toledo, and Detroit.

In Detroit at age 18, Billingsley was arrested and convicted on federal charges. He was sentenced to 15 months in prison, and spent time in Leavenworth before his conviction was reversed. When his brother ran out on his Detroit mob partners, he left for New York, with Sherman joining him within a short time. Billingsley began buying drug stores in New York City and even started his own real estate office to help him acquire drug stores.

In 1929, he created the Stork Club, which he owned. From the time of the speakeasy until the 1960s, he held court on East 53rd Street. According to Ralph Blumenthal in his 2000 book, Stork Club, another New York nightclub owner named Mary Louise Cecilia Guinan, widely known as Texas Guinan, introduced Billingsley to her friend, commentator Walter Winchell, in 1930. In his column in the New York Daily Mirror, Winchell called the Stork Club "New York's New Yorkiest place on W. 58th". He promoted the club by selecting prominent debutantes to frequent parties there and bring in society cliental. In 1941, he dubbed Betty Cordon, a debutante from North Carolina, as New York's "Number One Glamour Girl"

Billingsley was a friend of mafia boss Frank Costello, who patronized the Stork. On one occasion Costello gave Billingsley $100,000 to hold for him while he was out of the country for a time. Instead Billingsley spent the money to keep the club afloat, he barely managed to recoup the amount before Costello returned. According to Billingsley's daughter Costello expected this and intended to do him a favor. He was also a close friend of FBI director J. Edgar Hoover, who regularly patronized the club. Hoover was somewhat embarrassed by his association with Billingsley when it was revealed following a shooting incident Bllingsley was involved in, that he had used Hoover as a reference for his gun permit.

One of Billingsley's mistresses in the late 1930s was actress Ethel Merman. His nephew, Glenn Billingsley, was married to Leave It to Beaver actress Barbara Billingsley, not to be confused with Sherman Billingsley's daughter Barbara, who like his other children, sometimes was figured in publicity about the nightclub.

Billingsley married Hazel Donnelly (1902–1991) on August 25, 1924, and they had three daughters, Jacqueline (Rorke, 1926–1998), Barbara (Mohler, ~1936–2010), and Shermane (1944–2023).

== Bibliography ==
- Blumenthal, Ralph, Stork Club: America's Most Famous Nightspot and the Lost World of Café Society (Little, Brown and Company, 2000) ISBN 0-316-10531-7 (hc); ISBN 0-316-10617-8 (pb)
