= Le Galion =

French perfume manufacturer

Le Galion is a French perfumery, known for its high-end products. Among its brands are La Rose, Sortilège, Snob, and Lanvin. Le Galion was considered such a luxurious item that the Sortilège perfumes were once given as gifts at The Stork Club of New York City, associated with its wealthy clientele, which led it to becoming known as the "fragrance of the Stork Club".
