= Betty Cordon =

American socialite (1923–2012)

- Born: Betty Green Cordon; July 14, 1923; Roanoke Rapids, North Carolina, U.S.
- Died: May 17, 2012 (aged 88); St. Simons, Georgia, U.S.
- Education: Cathedral School of Saint Mary
- Occupation(s): socialite model philanthropist
- Known for: 1941 New York's Glamour Girl
- Spouse(s): Robert Sutton Saalfield Jr. (m. 1942; div); Frank Fordyce Silver (m. 1978)
- Children: 4

Betty Green Cordon Silver (July 14, 1923 – May 17, 2012) was an American debutante, socialite, and philanthropist. She was a leading debutante in North Carolina and member of New York City's café society who was dubbed "New York's Number One Glamour Girl" by Sherman Billingsley, the owner of the Stork Club, in 1941, and the "Nation's Number One Debutante" by The Wilmington Star in 1942. During World War II, she volunteered with the American Women's Voluntary Services and was featured in advertisement campaigns for Woodbury Soap Company. In 1956, Cordon was named "Woman of the Year" by the Association of Junior Leagues of America.

== Early life and family ==
Cordon was born on July 14, 1923 in Roanoke Rapids, North Carolina, to Elizabeth Cordon and Robert Windley Cordon and grew up in Wilmington, North Carolina. She later moved with her parents to New York City, where they lived at 1070 Park Avenue. Cordon was the great-granddaughter of Rev. Robert Bowen Windley, an Episcopal priest who served as the rector at Zion Episcopal Church in Washington, North Carolina. She was descended from American Revolutionary War General Nathanael Greene and from William Cordon, a colonial planter who received a land grant in the Province of Carolina from the Lords Proprietor in 1729.

She was educated at the Cathedral School of Saint Mary, an Episcopal all-girls school in Garden City, Long Island, graduating in 1941.

== Adult life ==
=== Society debut and World War II ===
Cordon was a prominent debutante in her youth. She was presented to society at the North Carolina Debutante Ball in 1941, the last year that the ball was held until after the end of World War II. Her parents hosted a coming out party for her at their Park Avenue home on December 7, 1941. She attended the Debutante Assemblies at the Waldorf Astoria Hotel on January 1, 1942 and served as Chairwoman of the debutante committee of the Daughters of the American Revolution's annual ball. Cordon was dubbed as New York City's "Number One Glamour Girl" following her selection by Sherman Billingsley, owner of Manhattan's Stork Club, in 1941 as a "debutante in residence" for his nightclub. From 1941 to 1942, she was the lead debutante on the New York social scene and part of the young café society. Cordon was also a popular society figure at Wrightsville Beach, where her family summered. As a prominent society figure during the war, she trained as a volunteer nurse's aid and was active in voluntary war efforts including the American Women's Voluntary Services, the Child Education Foundation, and modeled in advertisements for the Woodbury Soap Company.

=== Married life ===
Cordon married Pvt. Robert Sutton Saalfield Jr., a graduate of The Hill School and Princeton University and member of the United States Army Air Corps, on March 23, 1942. They had four children, Robert III, Betty, Windley, and David. They lived Akron, Ohio and later divorced.

In 1952, she served as a bridal attendant at the wedding of her sister, Mary Windley Cordon, and Kenneth Byron Walker at Christ Church United Methodist in New York City.

She later married again, in 1978, to Frank Fordyce Silver, and moved to St. Simons Island, Georgia in 1982.

=== Philanthropy and charity work ===
Cordon served as a trustee and board president of Akron Children's Hospital, served as a committee member of Akron University's endowment board, and founded the Women's Board of the Stan Hywet Hall Foundation. She served as president of the Junior League's chapters in Akron and in Pittsburgh. In 1956, she was awarded "Woman of the Year" by the National Junior League. While living in Akron, she worked in real estate.

In St. Simons, she was a member of the Cassina Garden Club and one of the founders of the Golden Isles Duplicate Bridge Club.

== Death ==
She died on May 17, 2012. Her funeral was held on June 20, 2012 at Christ Episcopal Church.
