= American Women's Voluntary Services =

WWII American womens' service organization

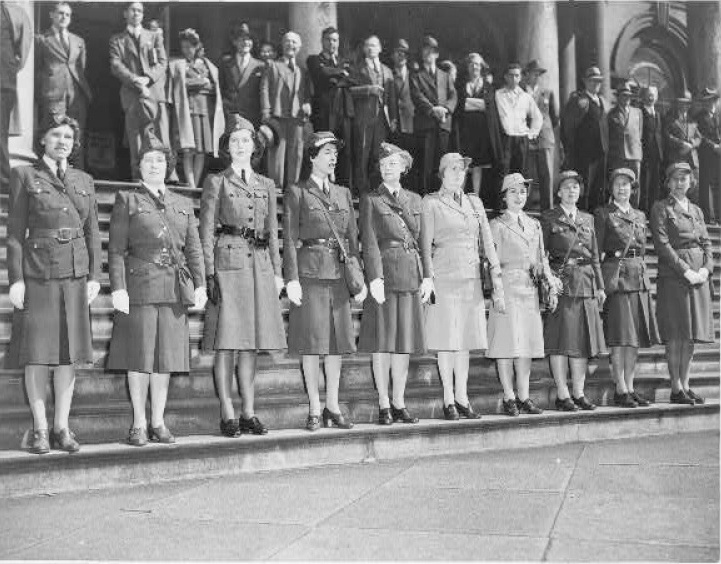
- Members of the American Women Voluntary Service in 1942 during World War II
- Formation: 1940
- Legal status: Service
- Headquarters: 39 W. 57th Street, Manhattan, New York City
- Region served: United States

American Women's Voluntary Services (AWVS) was the largest American women's service organization in the United States during World War II. AWVS volunteers provided support services to help the nation during the war, assisting with message delivery, ambulance driving, selling war bonds, operating emergency kitchens, cycle corps drivers, dog-sled teamsters, aircraft spotters, navigation, aerial photography, fighting fires, truck driving, and canteen workers. Some of its work overlapped with the Office of Civilian Defense and the American Red Cross.

== History ==
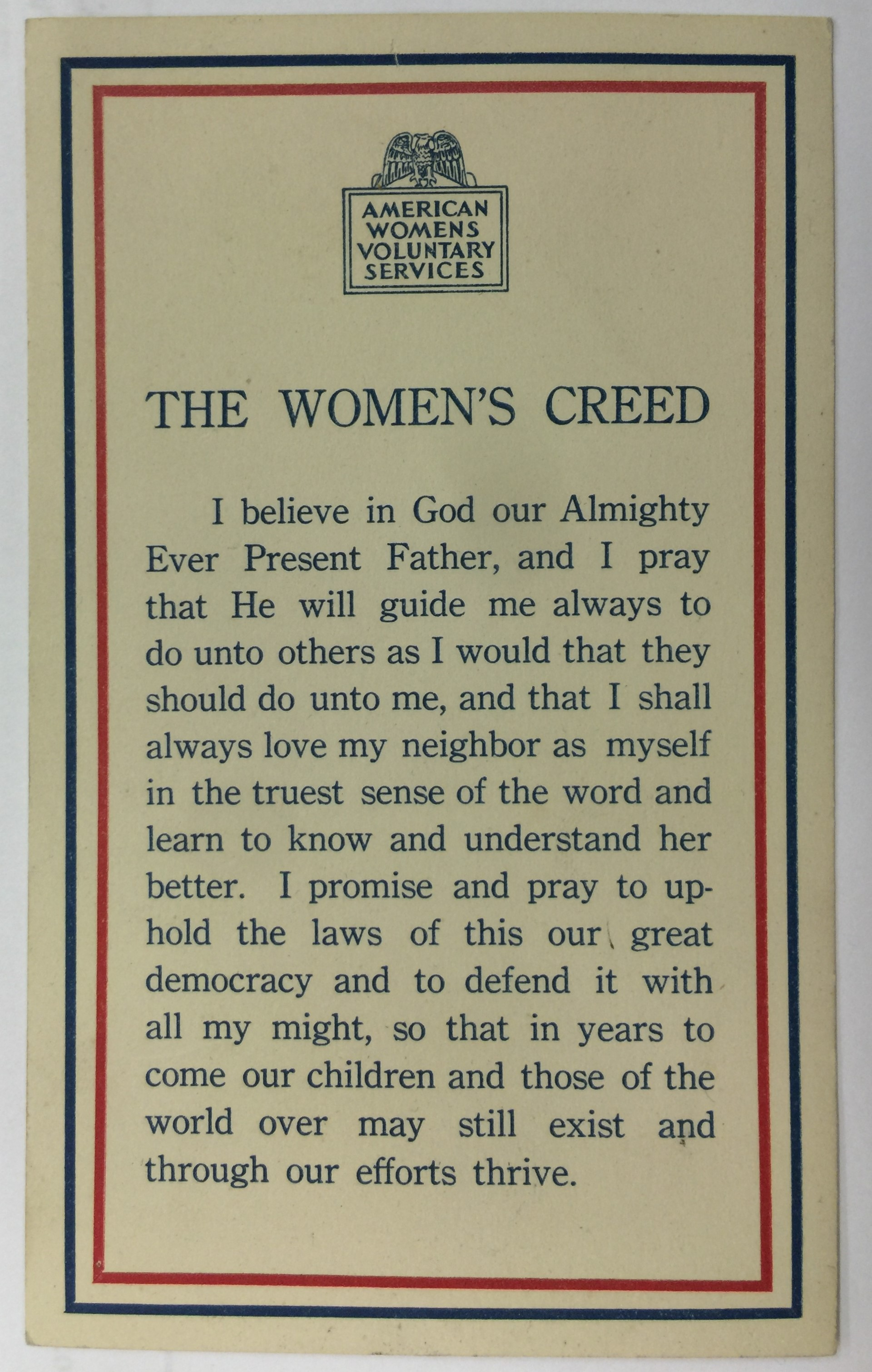
A prayer card issued by AMVS during their efforts supporting U.S. engagement in World War II

Alice Throckmorton McLean founded AWVS in January 1940, 23 months before the United States entered the war, basing it upon the British Women's Voluntary Services, in order to help prepare the nation for the war. Most of the founders were wealthy internationalist women, and its headquarters was in New York City, making America's isolationists suspicious of AWVS. Others saw the organization as being alarmist.

AWVS also encountered resistance because some men did not want women working.Despite these concerns, AWVS had about 18,000 members by the time of the attack on Pearl Harbor on December 7, 1941. Eventually, over 325,000 women were trained by AWVS. Doris Ryer Nixon founded the California chapter in August 1941 and became AWVS's national vice president.

The group sponsored units in parts of the U.S. with heavy African, Chinese, and Hispanic American populations, which was met with media criticism. By 1944, despite hundreds of thousands of volunteers and large efforts to help win the war, AWVS was accused of being lazy; its leaders decided to disband the organization at the end of World War II.

AWVS inspired other volunteer service groups, such as "Laguna Cottages for Seniors".

== Notable members ==
- Jeannette Osborn Baylies, 31st President General of the Daughters of the American Revolution
- Elizabeth English Benson, Gallaudet University dean and educator of the deaf
- Mary McLeod Bethune, educator and civil rights activist
- Clair Blank, author, Beverly Gray mystery series
- Gloria Callen, competitive swimmer
- Betty Cordon, socialite
- Joan Crawford, actress
- Mamie Eisenhower, First Lady and wife of U.S. President Dwight Eisenhower
- Isabella Greenway, U.S. Congresswoman from Arizona
- Josephine Herrick, photographer and educator
- Grace Nail Johnson, civil rights activist
- Adelaide Leavy, photo journalist
- Jeanette MacDonald, actress and singer
- Hattie McDaniel, actress
- Josephine B. Sneed, Cook County, Illinois politician
- Alice Throckmorton McLean, civic leader
- Doris Ryer Nixon, civic leader
- Lillian Randolph, actress and singer
- Betty White, actress

== See also ==
- United States home front during World War II#Volunteer activities
- United Service Organizations
