= ACME Newspictures =

ACME Newspictures sometimes credited as Acme News Photos was a United States news agency that operated from 1923 to 1952.

== History ==
ACME operated from 1923 to 1951, under the auspices of Newspaper Enterprise Association. Earlier it was known as United Newspictures. It was bought out by United Press in December 1951. Corbis has some of the images in its collection, while some are held by the New York Public Library.

ACME Newspictures was located at 220 East 42nd Street, New York City.

== Name ==
- Acme News
- Acme News Photos
- Acme Newspictures
- Acme Photographs
- Acme Photos
- Acme Telephoto
