= Mobile Arts Council =

- The headquarters at 318 Dauphin Street in downtown Mobile.
- Formation: 1955
- Legal status: Active
- Purpose: Promotes art and culture
- Headquarters: 70 N Joachim Street, Suite A Mobile, Alabama
- Location: 6 South Joachim Street, Mobile, Alabama
- Region served: Metro Mobile
- Director: Lucy Gafford
- Website: www.mobilearts.org

The Mobile Arts Council is an umbrella organization for the arts in Mobile, Alabama. It was founded in 1955 as a project of the Junior League of Mobile with the mission to "increase cooperation among artistic and cultural organizations in the area and to provide a forum for problems in art, music, theater, and literature." A full-time, paid director was hired in 1958. Among its many activities, it hosts the exhibition of the works of artists and provides funding for arts education.
