= Jerman =

Jerman is a surname. Notable people with the surname include:

- Aja Jerman (born 1999), Slovenian rhythmic gymnast
- Andrej Jerman (born 1978), Slovenian alpine skier
- Cornelia Petty Jerman (1874–1946), American suffragist
- Eddy Jerman (1865–1936), American inventor
- Greg Jerman (born 1979), American football player
- Lindsey Jerman (1915–1996), English cricketer
- Marcos Luis Jerman (born 1957), Argentinian-Slovenian cross-country skier
- Vida Jerman (1939–2011), Croatian theatre actress
- Wilson Roosevelt Jerman (1929–2020), American butler; served in the White House
- Željko Jerman (1949–2006), Croatian photographer
