= Angus Barn =

Restaurant in Raleigh, North Carolina

The Angus Barn LTD, LLC
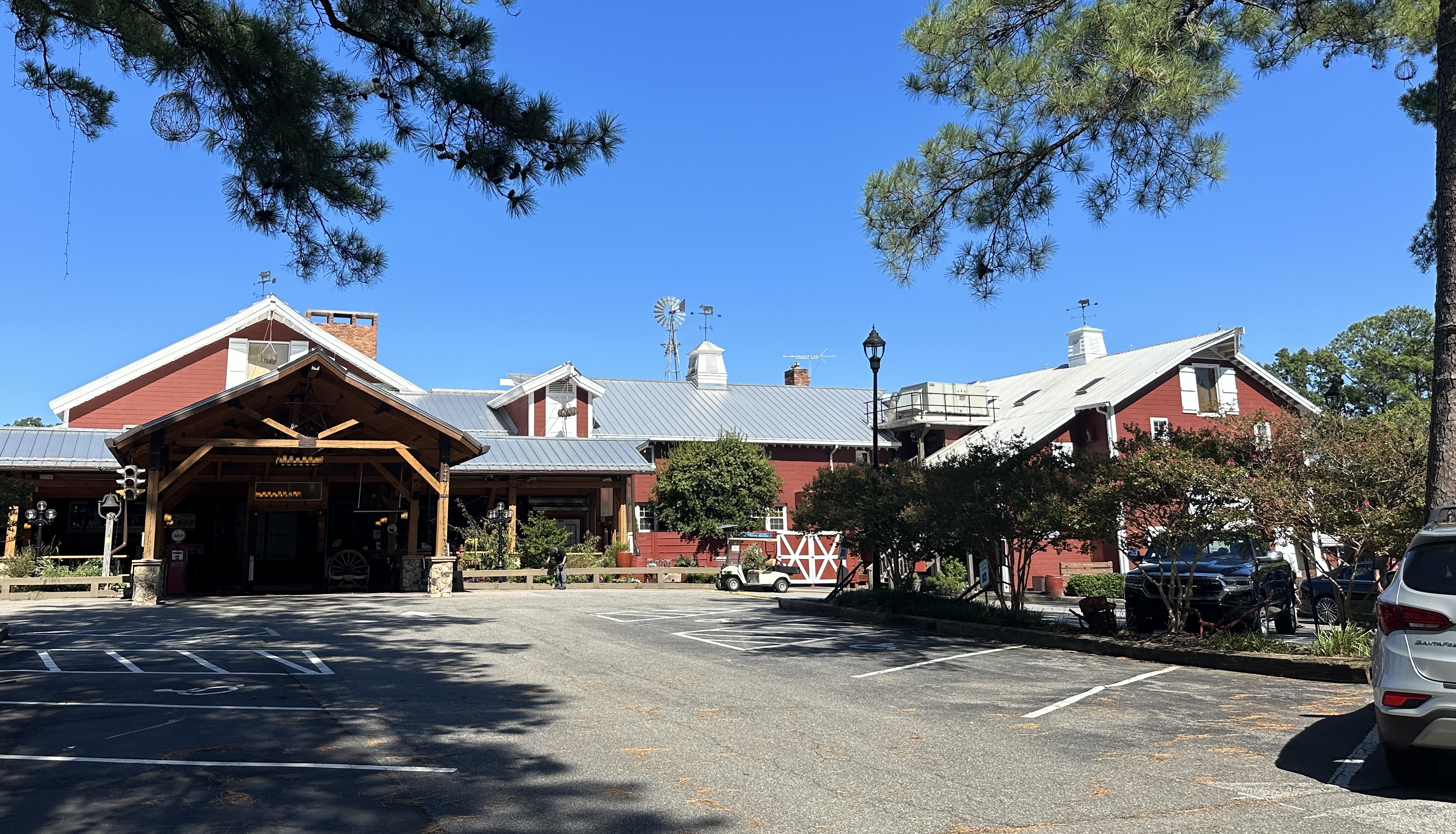
- Front view of Angus Barn in 2023
- Interactive map of The Angus Barn LTD, LLC

Restaurant information
- Established: June 28, 1960
- Owners: Van Eure and Steve Thanhauser
- Previous owners: Thad Eure Jr. and Alice Eure
- Food type: American, Steakhouse, Vegetarian Friendly
- Dress code: Business casual or nicer
- Location: 9401 Glenwood Ave, Raleigh, North Carolina, 27617
- Coordinates: 35°53′57.1″N 78°45′48.5″W
- Seating capacity: 900
- Reservations: Recommended
- Website: angusbarn.com

Angus Barn is a steakhouse restaurant in Raleigh, North Carolina, located off U.S. Route 70. Located between the cities of Raleigh and Durham, the establishment has grown popular from its central location and menu. The steakhouse has won over 200 awards since opening in 1960, and continues to operate under the management of the Eure family which helped cofound it.

== History ==
=== Founding ===
The land the steakhouse resides on was purchased in 1959 by Thad Eure Jr. and Charles Winston for US$6,750. The 50 acres (20 ha) plot located off U.S. Route 70 was before used as pastureland. Construction began immediately, but progress was slow as a result of a lack of funding they needed on the approximately US$200,000 building. After the two were unable to secure funding from banks because of the large cost, 20th Secretary of State of North Carolina and Eure Jr.'s father, Thad A. Eure, eventually provided much of the funding needed to complete construction, allowing the steakhouse to open on June 28, 1960. Operating first as a "steak and potato-based menu", the steakhouse began to grow in popularity, largely due to its location between the cities of Raleigh and Durham, which made it easier to access for residents of both. A fire would unfortunately ignite on the morning of February 7, 1964, destroying much of the building and requiring extensive renovation. During renovations, the steakhouse's seating would increase from 275 to double. Round the clock shifts would lead to the steakhouse reopening to the public on January 27, 1965. In 1978, Eure Jr. purchased all of Winston's stock in the steakhouse, after he left to pursue other endeavors.

=== Foundation of Hope ===
Profits gained by the steakhouse would be used by Eure Jr. and his wife in 1984 to create the "Foundation of Hope for Research and Treatment of Mental Illness" (abbreviated as "Foundation of Hope") a nonprofit designed to help fund research projects towards identifying causes of and treating mental illnesses including alcoholism, anorexia nervosa, autism, bipolar disorder, postpartum depression, PTSD, schizophrenia, and social phobias. According to an article by the Nation's Restaurant News, the foundation had given more than $2 million towards these causes by 2007, alongside their annual October "Walk for Hope", which was also started by the couple and employees of Angus Barn, Fat Daddy's, and 42nd Street Oyster Bar five years later in 1989.

=== Modern history ===
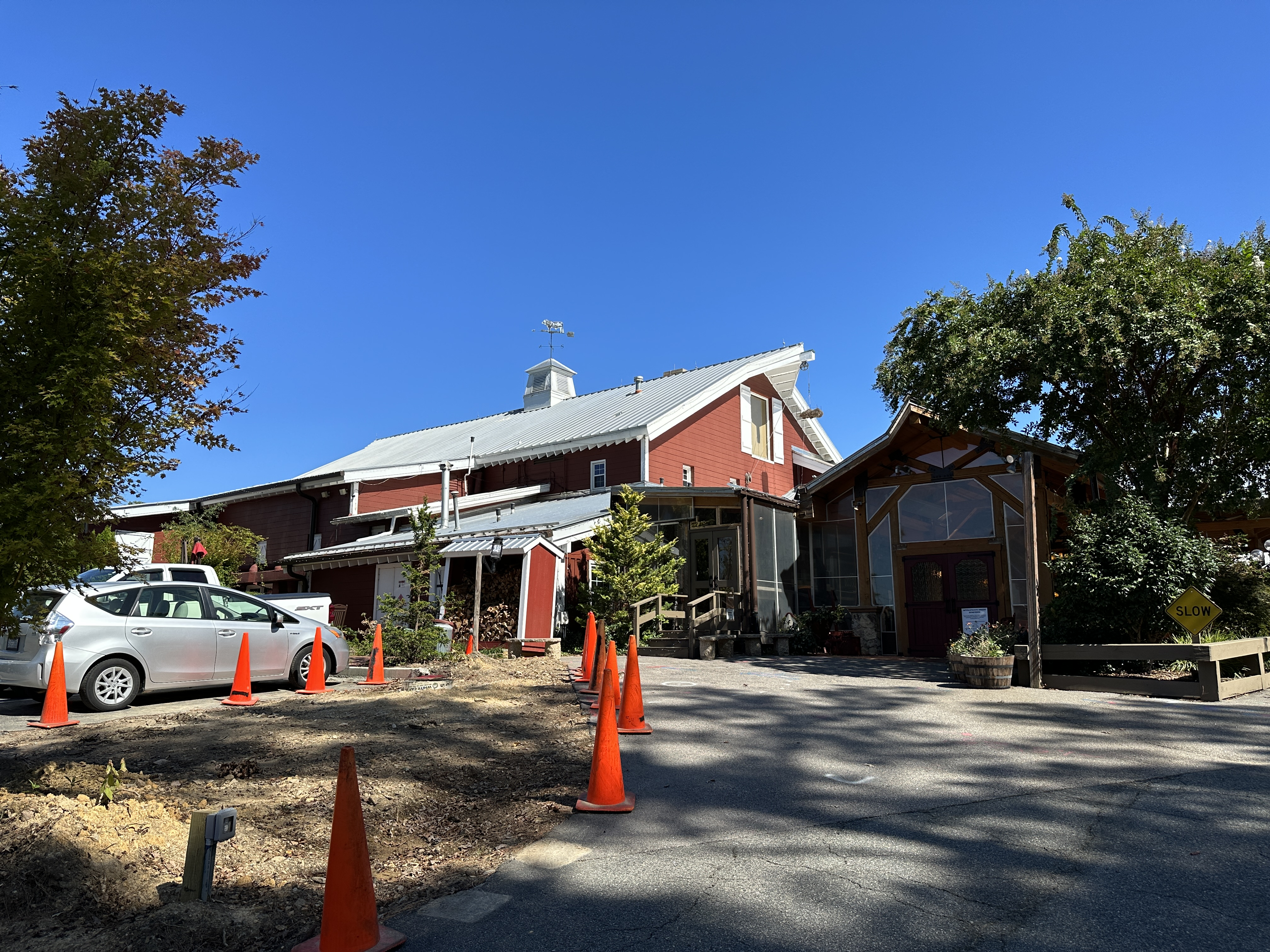
Left side view of the steakhouse

After Eure Jr.'s death in 1988, his wife Alice and his daughter Van became co-owners of the steakhouse. Van Eure, who has a Bachelor of Education the University of North Carolina, became the sole owner after her mother Alice's death in 1997. Eure once again co-owns the business with her husband Steve Thanhauser, with whom they have children in line to take over running the steakhouse one day. During the COVID-19 pandemic in 2020, the steakhouse only operated at half of its estimated 900 seating capacity.

In 2019, Restaurant Business Magazine estimated the average check was $72, the average meals sold per year was 313 thousand, and the estimated sales in one year was $22.7 million. In 2020, the estimate was updated to place the average check at $75, the average meals sold per year at 315 thousand, and the estimated sales in one year at $24.3 million.

The annual father-daughter luncheon for the North Carolina Debutante Ball is held at Angus Barn.

== Menu and services ==
=== Menu ===
The restaurant is an American cuisine steakhouse with vegetarian and gluten free options, and is only open during dinner. By the end of 2023, their most popular menu item was their fillet, followed by their New York-style strip steak, steak and lobster surf and turf, and ribs. The steakhouse also serves a number of self-made sauces for their meals. In the same year, the steakhouse also sold over 20,000 cuts of steak a month from its selection of nine types. For deserts, the steakhouse is known for its ice cream from state-raised cows, Chocolate Chess Pie, and Chocolate molten cake. The steakhouse is also known for their complementary crackers with their cheese. According to Eure, common but quality food is most important to the business, leading them to make everything homemade.

The steakhouse is also known for its variety of wines including First Growth, Burgundy wine, and Madeira wine. Aside from the international wines, wines are also imported in-state and nationally from states like Idaho and New York.

=== Employment ===
In terms of employment, the steakhouse is very selective, only hiring one out of every fifty applicants for their 240 employee workforce in 2007. According to the same 2007 report, all servers are required to wear an official uniform consisting of tuxedos and white gloves. Many current and former employees were certified Sommeliers. After being hired during Alice and Van Eure's co-ownership of the steakhouse in the 1990s, the executive head chef of the steakhouse was Alabama-native, 2006 Iron Chef America winner, Walter J. Royal. He served the position from 1997 to his death in May 2023, where he was remembered for his mentorship in the kitchen, being a "model employee" according to Van Eure, and his Iron Chef-winning ostrich burger with homemade chips with peanut dipping sauce, placed on the menu in his honor.

=== Services, dress code, and reservations ===
In terms of service, the steakhouse offers valet parking for customers. According to the steakhouse's website, there is a dress code in place which requires business casual or nicer. The current dress code is in contrast to their original 1970-era one, which required a jacket and tie for all customers. "Cut off shorts, tank tops, clothing with offensive graphics or language, revealing clothing or exposed undergarments," ball caps, hoodies worn on the head, and toboggans/beanies are all prohibited from the steakhouse. While not required, the steakhouse also recommends making reservations for dining, which can be made up to 120 days in advance for parties up to 12 on their website, with parties greater requiring a phone call to reserve.

== Interior ==
The steakhouse's interior includes four lounges: being "The Entrance Saloon", "The Humidor", "The Meat Locker", and the "Wild Turkey Lounge", and two main private dining areas: being "Alice's Room" and "Thad's Room" within the "Wine Cellar Kitchen".

The "Wild Turkey Lounge" was the first addition to the steakhouse after opening, being completed in 1978 alongside a lobby expansion and porch enclosure. The lounge includes multiple leather seats, TVs, and a light menu including spirits. Around 1994, work to improve the steakhouse's wine cellar took place, turning the cellar into the "Wine Cellar Kitchen". Within the new area, a dining area with 28 seats called "Alice's Room", named after Eure's mother, was added to the steakhouse with help from Alice. In 2004, an accompanying wine cellar dining area with 34 seats was added called "Thad's Room", named after Eure's deceased father. Since completion, Thad's Room has been used for teaching monthly cooking classes for couples. The rooms were personalized by using old artwork, cobblestone, furniture, and stained glass relating to family and Raleigh history. In line with this, there is also a Colt firearms display wall, which is advertised as the largest collection of single action Colts on the East Coast, also holding guns used by John Wayne, Clint Eastwood, Tex Ritter, and Hank Williams.

=== The Pavilion at the Angus Barn ===
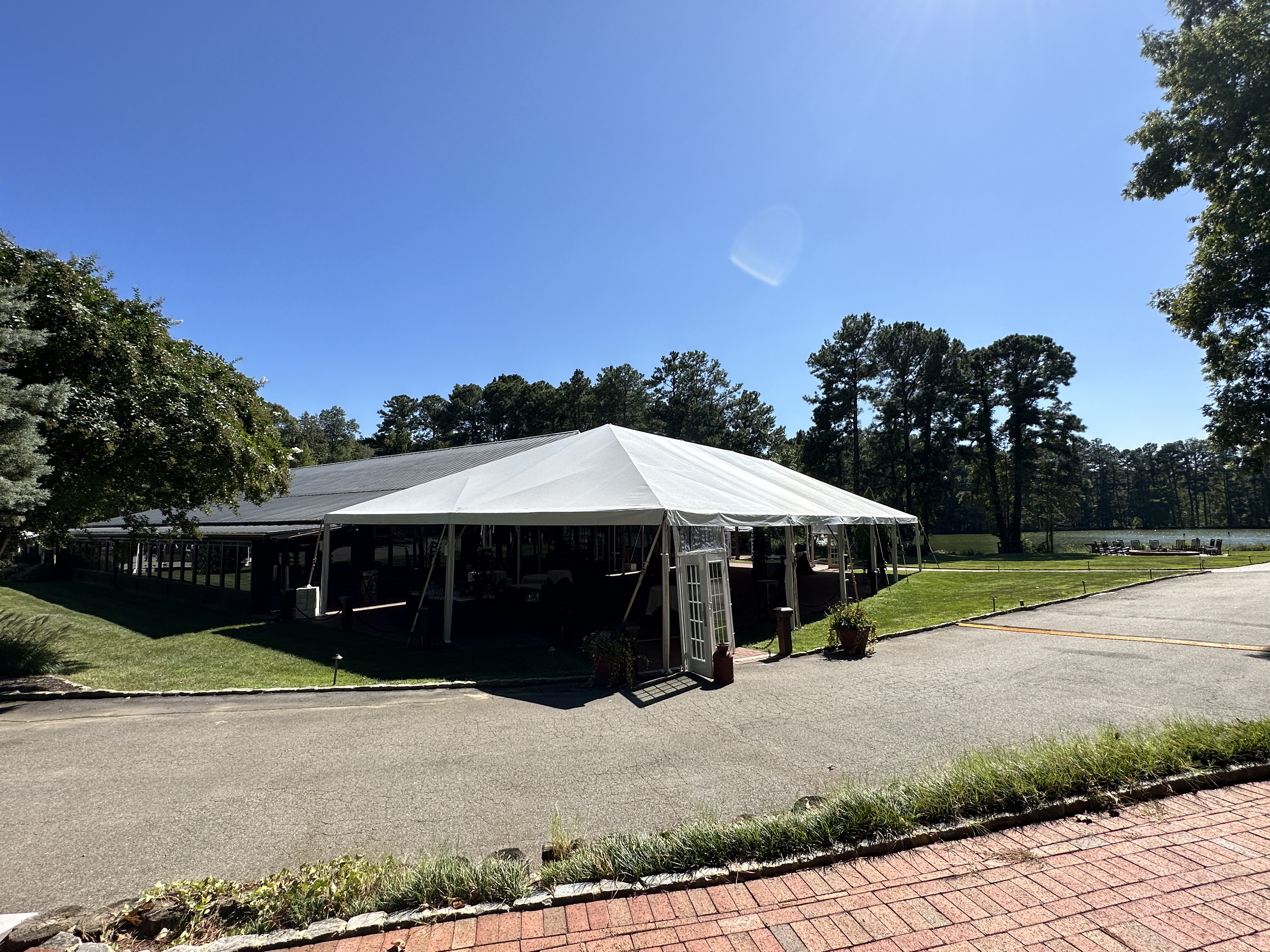
The Pavilion at the Angus Barn

The steakhouse also hosts weddings and corporate events at its adjacent lakeside pavilion. The Pavilion is built using stone from the historic Fayetteville Street and timber from Sherman's march through Raleigh in the civil war, and can hold up to 400 people. The Pavilion is also the location of the annual Foundation of Hope "Evening of Hope Gala" to raise funds and awareness for the charities causes.

== Events and partnerships ==
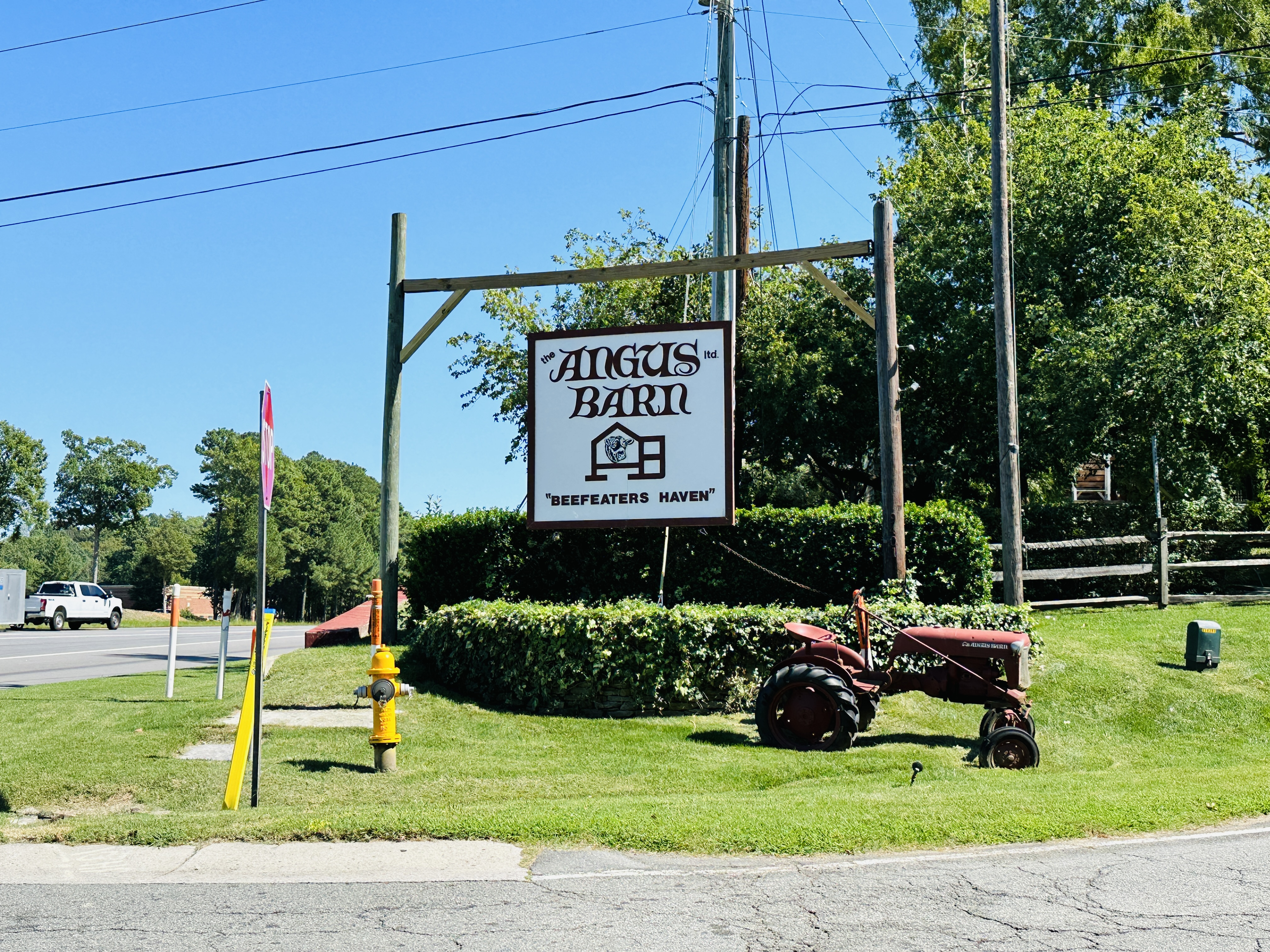
Entrance sign to the steakhouse

The Angus Barn has also opened itself to hosting competitions like the "Performance Food Service People's Choice Awards" in 2022. It has also worked with Campbell University and Meredith College to host gatherings and provide tours for students.

In 2015, the steakhouse partnered with the fast food restaurant PDQ to sell their "Royal Chicken Sandwich" meal to a wider market. Created by the steakhouse head chef Walter Royal, a dollar of every sale went towards charity. For years before 2016, the steakhouse has also partnered with the Conservators Center animal rescue based in Mebane, North Carolina to provide the carnivores there with the frozen scraps of their leftover meat.

=== Holiday observances ===
While the steakhouse holds a buffet on Thanksgiving Day alongside selling pre-made Thanksgiving Dinners to-go, the main holiday the steakhouse observes is Christmas. From mid-November and late-January, the steakhouse decorates the interior and exterior of the establishment with lights, Christmas trees, and themed-decor like ornaments and peppermints. Each year the steakhouse displays a different theme, such as "nutcrackers" in 2020, and offers gingerbread during December.

== Criticism and awards ==
The steakhouse has won over 200 awards since opening in 1960. The steakhouse has also been visited by a number of people from abroad from places like France and Greenland, and famous people including astronaut and former senator John Glenn.

Beginning in 1989, the American magazine Wine Spectator has awarded the steakhouse its "Grand Award" for wine selection for at least 31 consecutive years as of 2020, alongside their "Fine Dining Hall of Fame Award". It has also been named the second "Best Steak Restaurant" in the country by the magazine. In 2004, Van Eure received the International Foodservice Manufacturers Association (IFMA) "Gold Plate Award". In 2018 and 2020, the steakhouse won WRAL's "Voter's Choice Award" for "Best Steak" and "Best Fine Dining Restaurant". In 2019, Restaurant Business Magazine named the steakhouse the 15th best/most revenue-generating independent restaurant in the country, and its only Top 100 entry from North Carolina. The next year the magazine promoted them to 11th place. Also in 2019, the steakhouse won 33rd annual "Toast to the Triangle restaurant competition" with their ribs and chocolate chess pie. In 2022 and 2023, Raleigh Magazine rated the steakhouse one of the Top 25 restaurants in Raleigh. In 2023, Southern Living magazine rated the steakhouse as the best locally owned restaurant in North Carolina, and the eighth-best within the Southern United States. Also in 2023, steakhouse co-owners Van Eure and Steve Thanhauser won the North Carolina Restaurant and Lodging Association "Ken Conrad Award for Service to the Community" for the steakhouses contributions to the community through charity donations. Other awards earned include the Restaurants & Institutions "Ivy Award" and the "Distinguished Restaurants of North America Award".

The "Wild Turkey Lounge" in particular was ranked "One of the Best Business Bars" in the country by Entrepreneur Magazine in 2015, and one of the Top 5 best Whiskey/Lounges in Raleigh by Raleigh Magazine, also in 2015.
