= George B. Anderson =

Confederate States Army officer

George Burgwyn Anderson
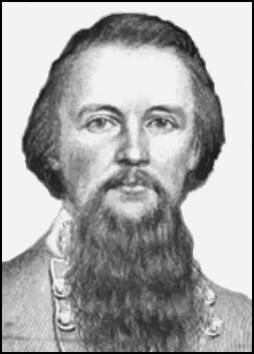
- George Burgwyn Anderson drawing drawn in 1862
- Born: April 12, 1831; Orange County, North Carolina
- Died: October 17, 1862 (aged 31); Raleigh, North Carolina
- Burial place: Historic Oakwood Cemetery Raleigh, North Carolina
- Military career
- Allegiance: United States of America; Confederate States of America
- Branch: United States Army; *Cavalry; Confederate States Army; *Infantry
- Service years: 1852–1861 (USA); 1861–1862 (CSA)
- Rank: First Lieutenant (USA); Brigadier General (CSA)
- Conflicts: Utah War: American Civil War; Battle of Williamsburg; Seven Days Battles; Battle of Malvern Hill; Battle of South Mountain; Battle of Antietam (DOW)

George Burgwyn Anderson (April 12, 1831 – October 17, 1862) was a Confederate military officer, serving first in the antebellum U.S. Army and then dying from wounds inflicted during the American Civil War while a general officer in the Confederate Army. He was among six generals killed or mortally wounded at the Battle of Antietam in September 1862.

Anderson owned an unknown number of slaves.

== Early life ==
George B. Anderson, the oldest son of planter William E. Anderson and his wife Frances Eliza Burgwyn, was born near Hillsborough, North Carolina. Anderson was the second cousin of Col. Henry K. Burgwyn of the 26th North Carolina. He entered the Caldwell Institute, where he graduated at the top of his class. While attending the University of North Carolina, he received an appointment to the United States Military Academy and graduated tenth of forty-three cadets in the Class of 1852. He was brevetted as a second lieutenant in the 2nd U.S. Dragoons and trained at the cavalry school at Carlisle Barracks, Pennsylvania. Anderson was promoted to second lieutenant on March 21, 1854.

== Military career and marriage ==
Following his training, Anderson was sent to California to assist in the survey of a proposed railroad route before joining his regiment at Fort Chadbourne in Texas. On December 13, 1855, he was promoted to first lieutenant. He commanded his cavalry troop in the march from Texas across the plains to Fort Riley, Kansas. In 1858, he was the adjutant of the regiment while serving in the Utah Territory during the Utah War and promoted to Captain. In 1859, he was ordered to Louisville, Kentucky, for duty as a recruiting officer. There, he met and married Mildred Ewing. He also served another stint as Adjutant from August 1858 to September 1859.

== Civil War ==
With the outbreak of the Civil War, Anderson resigned his U.S. Army commission on April 25, 1861, and returned home. The Governor of North Carolina, John Willis Ellis, appointed him as colonel of the 4th North Carolina Infantry on July 16. Anderson commanded the Confederate garrison at Manassas, Virginia, from October 14, 1861, to March 25, 1862.

Historian Douglas Southall Freeman wrote of Anderson, "All the physical excellencies coveted by soldiers were abundantly his - a handsome figure, fine horsemanship, a clear musical voice, a commanding presence. His discipline had seemed as mild as his blue-gray eyes, but it had been firm. In battle, as he rode calmly alert, with his golden beard flowing, he had inspired his fine regiments."

=== Peninsula Campaign and Malvern Hill ===
Anderson capably led his regiment at the Battle of Williamsburg in May 1862 and was rewarded a month later with a promotion to brigadier general on June 9. He was assigned command of a brigade in Major General D.H. Hill's division. In the Seven Days Battles, Anderson led his brigade at Gaines Mill. During the Battle of Malvern Hill on July 1, Anderson commanded both his own brigade and Brig. Gen Winfield Featherston's brigade of James Longstreet's division, as Featherston had been wounded the previous day at Glendale and his brigade's officer corps, having been decimated in the fighting, contained only inexperienced majors and captains. Anderson himself was wounded at Malvern Hill and command of his brigade fell to Col. Charles Tew of the 2nd North Carolina. While recovering, he was part of the defenses around Richmond, Virginia, in July 1862, serving in the 4th Brigade of Major General G.W. Smith's Division.

=== Maryland Campaign and death ===
Now able to return to active duty, Anderson resumed his brigade command in time for the Maryland Campaign. He fought at the Battle of South Mountain before marching into the Cumberland Valley to Sharpsburg, Maryland, as the Army of Northern Virginia concentrated.

During the Battle of Antietam, on 17 September 1862, Anderson led his veteran North Carolinians as they defended a portion of the Sunken Road (known as "Bloody Lane") against repeated Union attacks. A Minié ball struck Anderson near his ankle, shattering it. Anderson was transported to Shepherdstown and then by wagon up the Shenandoah Valley to Staunton, Virginia, to recuperate. He hoped to avoid amputation so that he could return to lead his men in the field. He was eventually shipped by train to Raleigh, North Carolina. There his infected foot was amputated, but he died on 17 October 1862 following the surgery.

Anderson is buried in Historic Oakwood Cemetery in Raleigh.

== See also ==
- List of American Civil War generals (Confederate)
