= Carolina Country Club =

Golf club in Raleigh, North Carolina, US

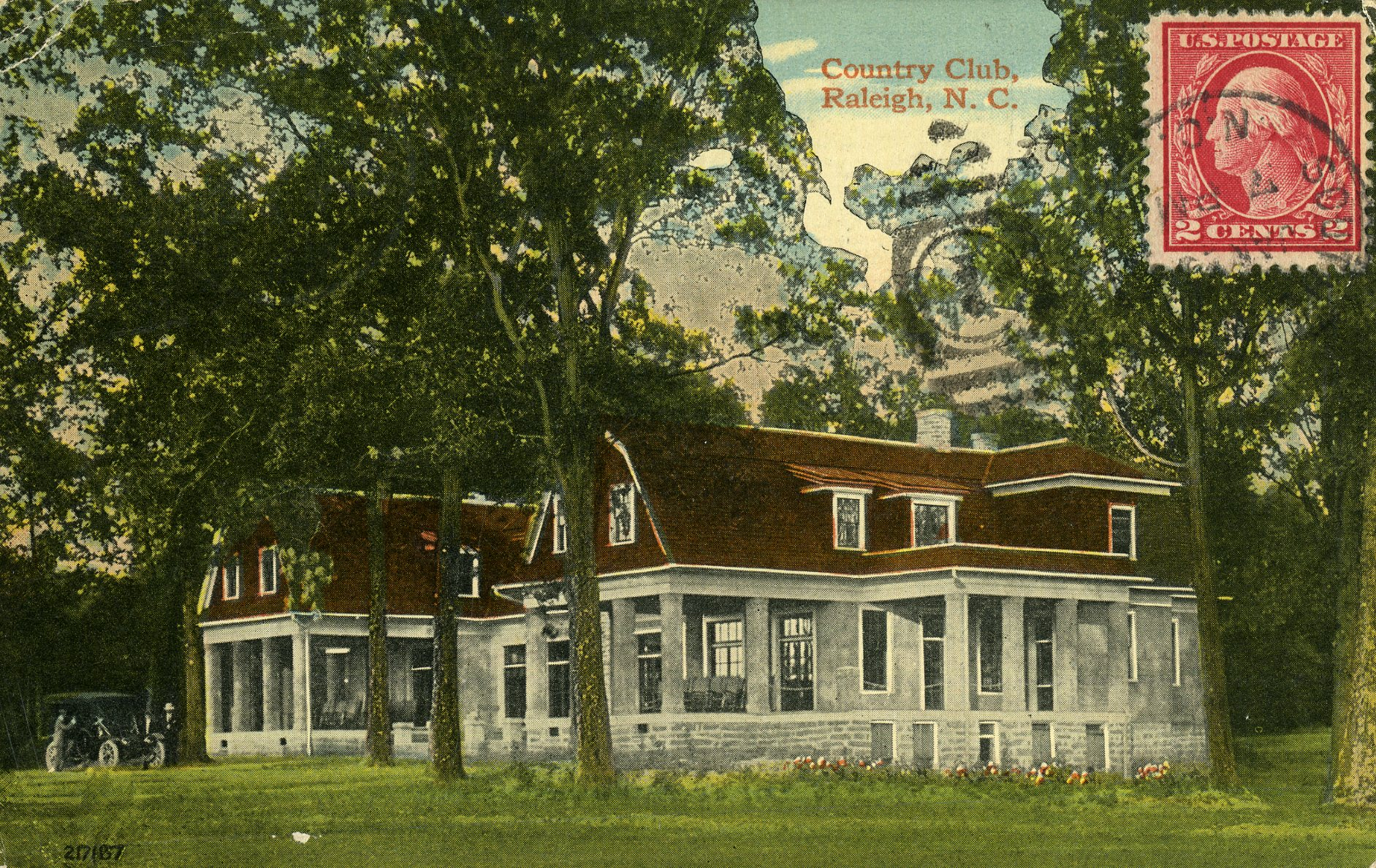
- Postcard depicting Carolina Country Club in 1929
- Interactive map of Carolina Country Club
- 35°49′2″N 78°39′20″W

Club information
- Location: 2500 Glenwood Avenue; Raleigh, North Carolina, United States
- Established: April 15, 1910
- Type: Private
- Total holes: 18
- Website: carolinacc.net
- Designed by: Rees Jones

Carolina Country Club is a private golf and country club in Raleigh, North Carolina. Founded in 1910, it is the oldest country club in Raleigh.

== History ==
Carolina Country Club was founded as Raleigh Country Club on April 15, 1910 (not to be confused with the club of the same name founded in 1948), when a certificate of incorporation was filed with the North Carolina Secretary of State. The original incorporators of the club were Charles Gold, E.B. Crow, Edgar Curtis Hillyer, W.H. Pace, W. C. Riddick, James H. Pou, H.E. Litchford, G.H. Andrews, C.B. Barbee, and Pleasant Daniel Gold Jr. It was renamed Carolina Country Club in 1918.

The first clubhouse, built on the same site of the present clubhouse, was constructed in 1910 just two miles outside of the Raleigh city limits. Each member owned an interest in the club's property. The first clubhouse was destroyed in a fire on Labor Day in 1919.

The second clubhouse, a 166,700 cubic-foot wooden one-and-a-half story building including a basement for men's locker rooms, was built on the same site. The second floor consisted of women's locker rooms and living quarters. The second clubhouse opened in 1921. On February 1, 1948, the second club house was destroyed in a fire that killed the club manager, James E. Baker, and his wife, two children and mother-in-law. Following the fire, a membership meeting was held at the Sir Walter Hotel where 440 stockholders approved a new building. A new building was constructed, as well as tennis facilities, a golf course, and a swimming pool for $320,000. The opening was featured in a two-page spread in the July issue of Life.

The current clubhouse, completed in 1993, is intended to appear as an "Old Southern Home". The country club is located in the Country Club Hills neighborhood, one of Raleigh's most affluent neighborhoods. It has five-start platinum status with the Platinum Clubs of America and was named an Emerald Club of the World by BoardRoom Magazine. The club includes an 18-hole championship golf course, a golf practice facility, twelve tennis courts (both hard surface and clay), a wellness center, a diving board pool, a diving well, and a splash zone pool.

The annual North Carolina Debutante Ball is held at the club following the formal debutante presentation at the Martin Marietta Center for the Performing Arts.

In 2013, the club admitted its first African-American members, Hilda Pinnix-Ragland and Alvin Ragland.

The golf course was updated by Rees Jones in 2016.

In 2022, there were 1,280 members and a 10-year-long waitlist for applicants.

== Notable members ==
- Brad Knott, U.S. Congressman
- Joanna Saleeby Knott, businesswoman and golfer
- Joseph Thomas Knott, attorney
- Lucile Aycock McKee, president of the Junior League of Raleigh
- Hilda Pinnix-Ragland, business executive and philanthropist
- W. C. Riddick, football coach and university administrator
- Mishew Edgerton Smith, socialite
