= W. C. Riddick =

American football coach and college administrator

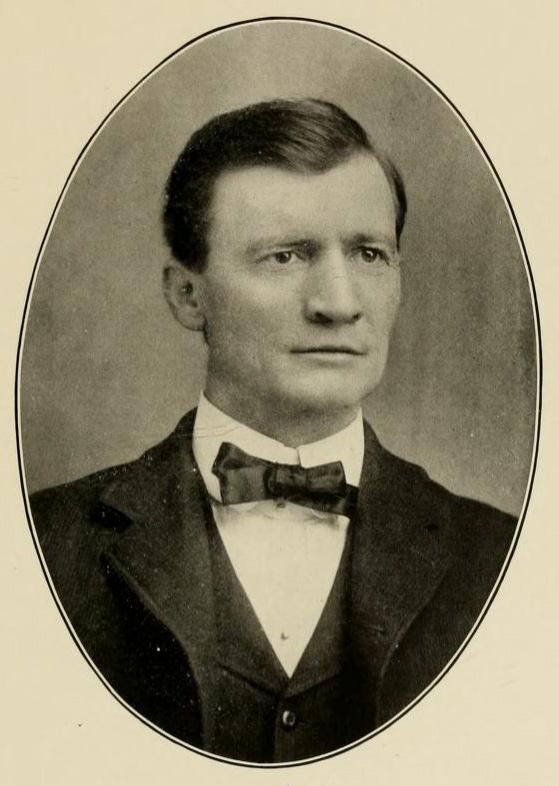
- Riddick pictured in Agromeck 1907, North Carolina State yearbook

Biographical details
- Born: August 4, 1864; Wake County, North Carolina, U.S.
- Died: June 9, 1942 (aged 77); Baltimore, Maryland, U.S.

Coaching career (HC unless noted)
- 1888–1889: Wake Forest
- 1898–1899: North Carolina A&M

Head coaching record
- Overall: 5–7–2

Wallace Carl Riddick Jr. (August 4, 1864 – June 9, 1942) was an American college football coach and university administrator. Riddick received his A.B. degree from the University of North Carolina at Chapel Hill and his degree in civil engineering from Lehigh University in Pennsylvania. He served as a consultant for several water projects and for the Seaboard Railroad. Riddick was also a member of the Board of Visitors for the United States Naval Academy and of several state boards and committees. Because of his advocacy on the students' behalf, Riddick was awarded with the Officer's Cross of the Order of St. Sava by King Alexander of Yugoslavia in 1931.

== Coaching career ==
Riddick served as the head football coach at Wake Forest University from 1888 to 1889, and at North Carolina College of Agriculture and Mechanic Arts, now North Carolina State University, from 1898 to 1899, compiling a career college football record of 5–7–2.

== North Carolina State University ==
Riddick assumed the presidency at North Carolina State University following Daniel Harvey Hill Jr.'s resignation in 1917. Riddick's administration added work to chemical, ceramics and aeronautics engineering, and developed an engineering experiment station. Riddick resigned as president in 1923 to become dean of the newly established school of engineering, and served in this capacity until his retirement in 1937. Riddick Stadium and Riddick Hall on N.C. State's campus were both named in honor of the former leader. NCSU Libraries Special Collections Research Center serves as the repository for Wallace Carl Riddick's manuscript collection.

== Personal life ==
Riddick was one of the organizing incorporators of the Carolina Country Club in Raleigh, North Carolina.

== Death ==
Riddick died at a Baltimore hospital on June 9, 1942, after weeks of ill health. His wife had predeceased him by a few weeks.

== Head coaching record ==
Year	Team	Overall	Conference	Standing	Bowl/playoffs
Wake Forest Baptists (Independent) (1888–1889)
1888	Wake Forest	1–1			
1889	Wake Forest	2–2			
Wake Forest:		3–3			
North Carolina A&M Aggies (Southern Intercollegiate Athletic Association) (1898–1899)
1898	North Carolina A&M	1–2			
1899	North Carolina A&M	1–2–2			
North Carolina A&M:		2–5–2			
Total:		5–7–2			
