= Hilda Pinnix-Ragland =

American business executive (born 1955)

- Born: Hilda Pinnix; May 1955 (age 71); Hillsborough, North Carolina, U.S.
- Education: North Carolina A&T State University; Duke University
- Occupations: business executive, philanthropist
- Spouse: Alvin Glendale Ragland
- Children: 1

Hilda Pinnix-Ragland (born May 1955) is an American business executive and philanthropist. As the former Vice President of Corporate Public Affairs for Duke Energy, she was the first African-American woman to serve as a vice president at the company. She previously worked as the Vice President of Energy Delivery Services, Vice President of the North Region, and Vice President of Economic Development for Progress Energy Inc and was the first African-American woman to serve as a vice president. She currently serves on the board of directors for RTI International as Chair Audit & Risk Committee, in 2016, she was appointed to the 8 Rivers Capital, an energy technology company's Board and in 2020 she was appointed to the Board of Directors of Southwest Water Company. She is often the first African-American woman board member. Pinnix-Ragland also serves as the chairwoman of the board of trustees at North Carolina A&T State University. In May 2017 she co-authored the book The Energy Within Us: An Illuminating Perspective from Five Trailblazers.

== Early life and education ==
Pinnix-Ragland grew up in Hillsborough, North Carolina on her family's angus farm, the daughter of Lloyd Lee Pinnix and Irene Miles. Her family had been African-American landowners for five generations. In 1965 she was escorted to school by members of the United States Marshals Service during the integration of Aycock Elementary School.

As a teenager she was a member of the track and field team at Orange High School, was a Girl Scout, and participated in the youth organization 4-H. Pinnix-Ragland got her bus driver license in Orange County while in school, and was one of the first female school bus drivers in the county, and also worked at her uncle's gas station. She graduated from high school in 1973.

She graduated magna cum laude from North Carolina A&T State University, where she was a member of Alpha Kappa Alpha, in 1977 with a degree in accounting. She obtained a master of business administration degree in finance from Duke University's Fuqua School of Business in 1986. She also completed Harvard University's Kennedy School of Public Policy Executive Leadership program and completed graduate studies in taxation at St. John's University.

== Career ==
After graduating from college, she moved to New York City and worked as an auditor for Colgate-Palmolive and as a senior auditor for Arthur Anderson. In 1980 she moved back to North Carolina and began working for Carolina Power & Light, which later became Progress Energy, as a systems auditor. Pinnix-Ragland was the only female auditor and person of color on her team at Progress Energy. She moved from auditing to the treasury, and was later appointed as a vice president of economic development, vice president of energy delivery services, and vice president of the northern region for the company. Pinnix-Ragland was the first African-American woman to serve as a vice president within the company. After Progress Energy merged with Duke Energy in 2012, she was named the Vice President of Corporate Public Affairs. In this capacity, she worked with public officials at the local, state, and federal levels to develop public policies to protect consumers and businesses. Pinnix-Ragland retired from Duke Energy in June 2016. She was appointed as the first African-American woman to the board of directors by Bill Kavanuagh, and later became an officer of the board. She also serves as the Vice Chair of Progress Energy's Corporate Diversity Council.

In 2013, she served on the board of directors of the North Carolina Institute of Medicine. She also serves on the board of directors for Southwest Water Company, serves as vice-chair of the board of directors at RTI International, and is a consultant with TVA Power. She served as chairwoman of the board of directors of the North Carolina Community College System, as co-chair of Wake Invests in Women, and as chair of the board of directors of the American Association of Blacks in Energy. She is a member of the National Association of Corporate Directors and is also a co-chair of Wake Education Partnership. She serves as the Chairwoman of the Nominating and Governance Committee and Chair Audit Committee, on the board of advisors at 8 Rivers Financial Capital, and is chair of the board of directors for North Carolina Dental Services. She also served as the co-chair of the Governor of North Carolina's transition team and the state's Budget Reform and Accountability Commission. She was nominated by U.S. President Barack Obama to serve on the board of the National Park Foundation.

Ragland founded STEMulus Academy, a science, technology, engineering, and mathematics program for fifth grade girls in Wake County. She founded the Hilda Pinnix-Ragland Endowment through the North Carolina Community Foundation, which provides scholarships for accounting students at North Carolina A&T State University.

In 2007, she was a recipient of the American Association of Blacks in Energy's James E. Stewart Award. In 2008 she received the North Carolina 4-H Lifetime Achievement Award. In 2012 she was listed as one of the Top 100 Influential Women in Corporate America by Savoy Magazine. She was awarded the Education Award for Leadership in Community Colleges by Joe Biden. In 2017 Triangle Business Journal presented Pinnix-Ragland with the Women in Business Lifetime Achievement Award. She was inducted into the 2020 Lifetime Hall of Fame for NCA&T State University Business School.

In May 2019, she co-authored the book The Energy Within Us: An Illuminating Perspective from Five Trailblazers with Carolyn Green, Joyce Hayes Giles, Rose McKinney-James and Telisa Toliver.

== Personal life ==
Pinnix-Ragland is married to Alvin Glendale Ragland, a human resources specialist who serves as head of human resources for Sony Ericsson in Research Triangle Park. They have one daughter and live in Cary, North Carolina. She and her husband are members of Carolina Country Club in Raleigh, North Carolina. They were the first African-American members in the country club's 103-year history when they joined in 2013.

She is Episcopalian and teaches Sunday school at St. Ambrose Episcopal Church in Raleigh.
