= Miriam Carson Williams =

American banker

- Born: Miriam Carson White; 1831; Smithfield, North Carolina, U.S.
- Died: 1910 (aged 78–79)
- Resting place: Historic Oakwood Cemetery
- Occupation: bank executive
- Spouse: John Griffith Williams

Miriam Carson White Williams (1831–1910) was an American banker. She was the first woman to serve as President of a U.S-based bank. Williams became President of the State National Bank of Raleigh, North Carolina in 1879, after the death of her husband, then-President John Griffith Williams (1827–1879).

== Life ==
Williams was born in Smithfield, North Carolina. She married John Griffith Williams.

== Career ==
John Griffith Williams was President of the State National Bank of Raleigh. Upon his death in 1879, Miriam took over as President of the bank making her the first woman to serve as President of a US-based bank. She held the position for a few years after which her son-in-law, Charles E. Cross, became the bank's President.

Cross and Miriam's brother, Samuel C. White, stole money all of the bank's funds and fled to Canada forcing the bank to close.

== Death ==
Williams died in 1910 and is buried in the Historic Oakwood Cemetery in Raleigh.
