= Marguerite McKee Moss =

American debutante

Marguerite McPheeters McKee Moss is an American debutante. In 1963, she was selected by the Terpsichorean Club to serve as the lead debutante at the North Carolina Debutante Ball.

== Early life and education ==
Moss was born in Raleigh, North Carolina to James McKee, the executive vice president of the North Carolina Products Corporation, and Lucile Aycock McKee, president of the Junior League of Raleigh. She was the great-granddaughter of North Carolina Governor Charles Brantley Aycock and First Lady Cora Lily Woodard Aycock. Moss was the niece of U.S. Secretary of the Army Kenneth Claiborne Royall and a cousin of politician Kenneth Claiborne Royall Jr.

She graduated from St. Mary's School and Sweet Briar College. She earned a master's degree in art history from the University of North Carolina at Chapel Hill.

== Adult life ==
In 1963, she was selected by the Terpsichorean Club to be the lead debutante at the North Carolina Debutante Ball. She was a member of the Junior League of Raleigh.

In November 1970, her engagement to Robert Lancaster Williams Moss of Baltimore was announced in The New York Times. They married on January 30, 1971, at Christ Episcopal Church in Raleigh. They moved into her childhood home, 1000 Harvey St. in the Hayes Barton Historic District of Raleigh, where they raised their two daughters, Dorothy and Lucile.

In 1972, she served as matron of honor at the society wedding of her sister, Lucile Best McKee to William Clarkson IV.

Moss and her husband were married for fifty years, until his death in January 2021.
