= Mishew Edgerton Smith =

American debutante (1935–1981)

- Born: Mishew Ellen Edgerton; May 29, 1935; Raleigh, North Carolina, U.S.
- Died: September 1, 1981 (aged 46); Raleigh, North Carolina, U.S.
- Resting place: Historic Oakwood Cemetery
- Education: Ravenscroft School; Holton-Arms School; Junior College of Washington
- Occupation: socialite
- Spouse: Alton Battle Smith

Mishew Ellen Edgerton Smith (May 29, 1935 – September 1, 1981) was an American debutante and socialite. In 1953, she was selected by the Terpsichorean Club to lead the North Carolina Debutante Ball.

== Early life and family ==
Smith was born Mishew Ellen Edgerton on May 29, 1935, in Raleigh, North Carolina, to Mishew Ellen Rogers Edgerton and Norman Edward Edgerton. She grew up at Tatton Hall, her family's palatial mansion on Oberlin Road. They were members of Carolina Country Club. Her father was a prominent businessman who owned the Raleigh Bonded Warehouse and served as president of the Raleigh Chamber of Commerce, president of the Raleigh Kiwanis Club, and president of the Raleigh Shriners. Her grandfather, Noah Edgerton, owned a cotton mill in Selma, North Carolina. Her grandmother was a niece of the philanthropist Richard Stanhope Pullen of Pullen Plantation.

Smith was educated at the Ravenscroft School in Raleigh, the Holton-Arms School in Maryland, and Junior College of Washington.

== Adult life ==
In September 1953, she was presented to society at the North Carolina Debutante Ball, where she was selected as head debutante. She wore a gown designed by Willie Otey Kay for the occasion.

On April 20, 1956, she married Alton Battle Smith, the grandson of Senator Willis Smith, at Edenton Street United Methodist Church. The ceremony was officiated by Bishop Paul Neff Garber of the North Carolina Annual Conference and Rev. Dr. Howard P. Powell. A reception was held at Tatton Hall. The couple honeymooned in Montego Bay, Jamaica.

She was a member of the Junior League of Raleigh and, prior to her marriage, was a member of the Spinster's Club of Washington, D.C. Like her parents, she was a benefactor of Edgerton Memorial United Methodist Church in Selma.

She had a son, Alton Battle Smith Jr., who inherited her father's company, and a daughter, Mishew Edgerton Smith, who followed in her footsteps as a lead debutante at the North Carolina ball.

Smith died in Raleigh on September 1, 1981, and was buried in Historic Oakwood Cemetery. A pair of 18th-century Delftware vases that once belonged to Smith were donated in her memory to the Joel Lane House Museum.
