= Henry K. Burgwyn =

Confederate Army officer in the American Civil War

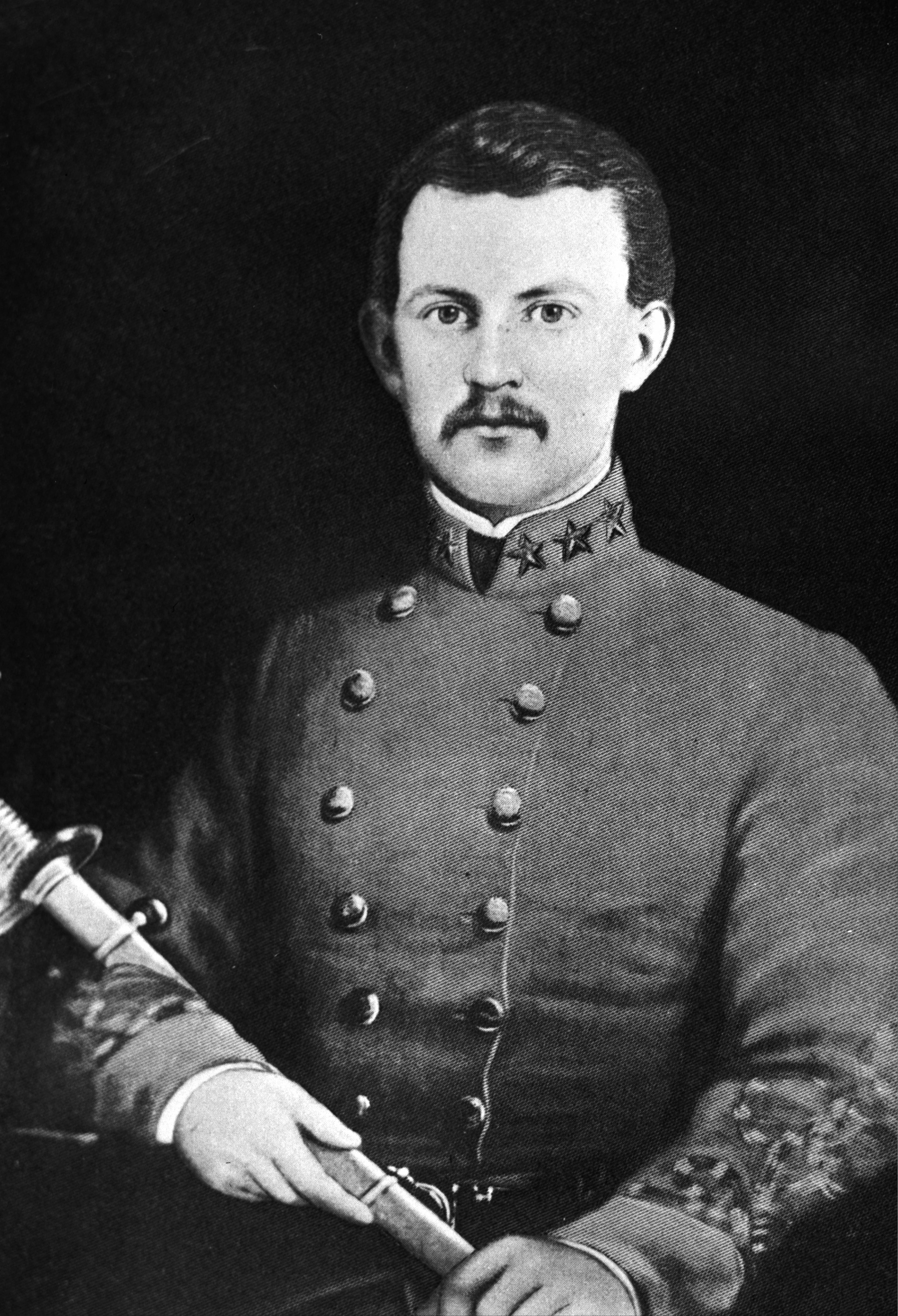
- Born: October 3, 1841; Jamaica Plain, Massachusetts
- Died: July 1, 1863 (aged 21); Gettysburg, Pennsylvania
- Burial place: Historic Oakwood Cemetery; Raleigh, North Carolina
- Education: Virginia Military Institute
- Military career
- Allegiance: Confederate States
- Branch: Confederate States Army
- Service years: 1861–1863
- Rank: Colonel
- Nickname: "Boy Colonel"
- Commands: 26th North Carolina Infantry
- Conflicts: American Civil War: Battle of New Bern; Peninsula Campaign; Battle of Malvern Hill; Battle of Goldsborough Bridge; New Bern Campaign; Washington Campaign; Gettysburg campaign; Battle of Gettysburg †

Henry King Burgwyn Jr. (October 3, 1841 – July 1, 1863) was a Confederate colonel in the American Civil War who was killed at the Battle of Gettysburg.

== Early life ==
Burgwyn was born in Jamaica Plain, Massachusetts, to Henry King Burgwyn Sr. and Ann Greenough Burgwyn while his parents were vacationing there. He was the second cousin of Brig. Gen. George B. Anderson. Burgwyn grew up in Northampton County, North Carolina, at Thornberry, the family plantation. He attended Burlington College in North Carolina. Hoping for but never receiving an appointment to the United States Military Academy at West Point, New York, Burgwyn instead graduated from the University of North Carolina in 1857. He then graduated from the Virginia Military Institute as a member of the class of 1861. Burgwyn spent a few tours as a recruiting officer in North Carolina and then as commandant of Camp Crabtree in Raleigh, North Carolina, where he drilled and attempted to instill discipline in the recruits.

== Civil War ==
In August 1861, after a personal recommendation from VMI professor Thomas Jonathan Jackson for an appointment as a Confederate officer, Burgwyn became lieutenant colonel of the 26th North Carolina Infantry Regiment at just 19 years of age. He took part in the 26th North Carolina's fight against Ambrose E. Burnside at the Battle of New Bern and narrowly escaped capture. The regiment next took part in the failed attack on the Union position at Malvern Hill. Burgwyn was promoted to colonel in August 1862 and took command of the regiment when its commander, Zebulon B. Vance (who Burgwyn felt was unfit for command), was elected governor of North Carolina, despite the fact that the 26th North Carolina's brigade commander, Brig. Gen. Robert Ransom, was against the promotion. Ransom and Burgwyn disliked each other and the 26th was transferred from Ransom's command to the brigade of Brig. Gen. J. Johnston Pettigrew.

Burgwyn spent much of the fall and winter of 1862 in eastern North Carolina with minor engagements against Union forces. During this period he was also instrumental in recruitment and conscription activity and drilling these new soldiers. Burgwyn next led the 26th at the Battle of Goldsborough Bridge. The regiment was heavily involved in Daniel Harvey Hill's New Bern and Washington campaigns. The 26th was then sent north to join the Army of Northern Virginia, arriving shortly after the Battle of Chancellorsville. When his regiment joined Lee's Army, Burgwyn was thought to be the youngest colonel to have served to that point with the Army, and the 26th was the largest regiment in the Army.

== Gettysburg and death ==
Burgwyn and the 26th North Carolina moved north toward Pennsylvania as part of the Gettysburg campaign. The 26th engaged in brutal fighting against Solomon Meredith's vaunted Iron Brigade in Herbst's Woods on the afternoon of July 1, 1863, at Gettysburg. As the regiment was exiting Herbst's Woods and reaching the crest of McPherson's Ridge, Burgwyn was shot through both lungs and mortally wounded carrying the colors of the 26th (Historian Earl J. Hess wrote that Burgwyn had just passed the colors to a private then the colors fell again and Burgwyn turned to see what had happened and was then shot). According to William M. Cheek, an eyewitness at the time:

The color sergeant was killed quite early in the advance and then a private of F Company took the flag. He was shot down and the flag was taken up by a Captain McCreary, who was killed shortly thereafter. Then Colonel Burgwyn himself took the colors and as we were advancing over the brow of a little hill and he was a few feet in advance of the center of the regiment, he was shot as he partly turned to give an order, a bullet passing through his abdomen.

In all, 13 color bearers for the 26th North Carolina were either killed or wounded. Burgwyn died about two hours after he was wounded and was buried on the field north of the Chambersburg Pike in an empty gun case.

Another eyewitness and a member of Burgwyn's command, Fred A. Olds, wrote in a letter that he was with the Colonel when he died:

I remember that his last words were that he was entirely satisfied with everything, and "The Lord's will be done." Thus he died, very quietly and resigned. I never saw a braver man than he. He was always cool under fire and knew exactly what to do, and his men were devoted to him.

For his gallantry and heroism, Colonel Burgwyn was listed on the Confederate Honor Roll. His family had his body exhumed in 1867 and he was laid to rest in Raleigh's Historic Oakwood Cemetery.
