= North Carolina Debutante Ball =

Annual ball in Raleigh, North Carolina

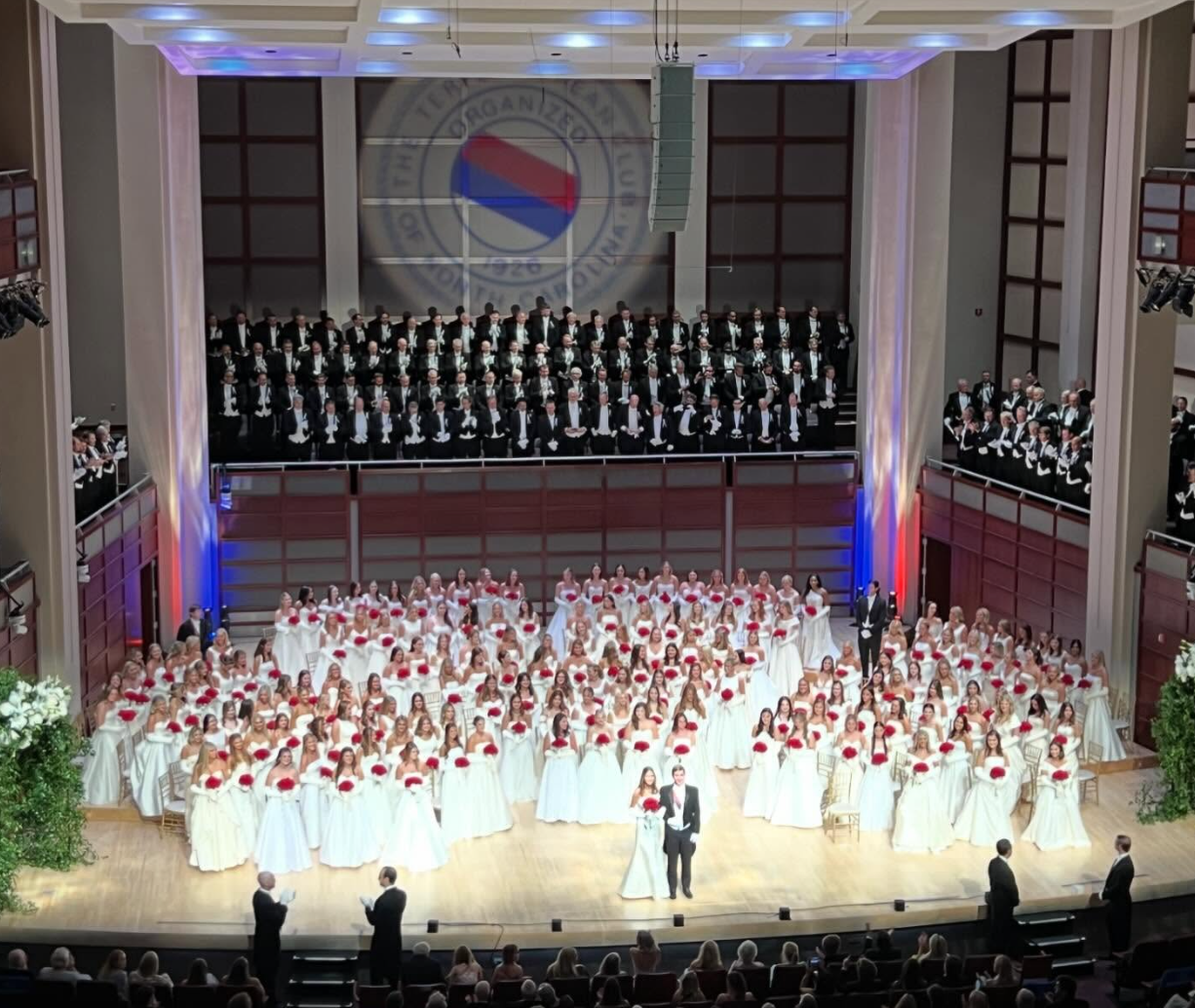
- The debutante presentation in 2024
- Genre: debutante ball
- Date: Labor Day weekend
- Frequency: annually
- Locations: Angus Barn (luncheon); Martin Marietta Center for the Performing Arts (presentation); Carolina Country Club (ball)
- Inaugurated: 1927
- Patron: The Terpsichorean Club

The Terpsichorean Club Debutante Ball, commonly referred to as the North Carolina Debutante Ball, is an debutante ball held annually in Raleigh, North Carolina. Hosted by the Terpsichorean Club of Raleigh, it is the oldest and most prestigious debutante ball in North Carolina. Originally organized in 1923 as a beauty pageant affiliated with the Raleigh Fall Festival, the formal debutante ball formed in 1927 with the founding of the Terpsichorean Club. The ball is held every year over Labor Day weekend in downtown Raleigh. It is the only remaining state-wide debutante ball in the United States.

== History ==
The North Carolina Debutante Ball was originated in 1923, when a group of merchants from Raleigh, North Carolina sponsored the Raleigh Fall Festival. Young women from prominent North Carolinian families were presented as candidates to be crowned as Queen of the Festival by Governor Cameron A. Morrison. In 1927 the Terpsichorean Club, a secret society named after the Greek muse Terpsichore, was formed to organize and sponsor the first official North Carolina Debutante Ball. The annual ball was set to be held on the first weekend after Labor Day at the Raleigh Civic Center.

Over time, the debutante season expanded from one evening ball to a weekend including tea parties, luncheons, parties, and two formal dances held at Raleigh Memorial Auditorium. During this time, the tradition of having each debutante formally presented, as they were during the festival, was reestablished. Each debutante was escorted by a chief marshal and four assistant marshals. In 1956 the rules changed and the number of assistant marshals permitted was reduced to two. In 1953 the rules were changed again to allow fathers to serve as chief marshals for their daughters.

The ball was placed on a hiatus during World War II. In 1948 the ball was postponed until the week after Christmas due to a polio epidemic in the Piedmont Triad. In 1996 the ball was postponed again due to severe damage across the state from Hurricane Fran.

The first African-American debutante was presented at the ball in 2017.

== Modern ball ==
Every year young women from around North Carolina, usually in their freshman or sophomore year of college, are nominated to be presented at the ball. Members of the Terpsichorean Club make the final selection of candidates. The women are selected from families who have made economic, social, cultural, or civic contributions to North Carolina. A "lead debutante" is selected every year from Wake County, as the seat of the state capitol. The ball weekend, still during Labor Day weekend, includes eight functions. Prior to the ball, a father-daughter luncheon is held at Angus Barn, an upscale steakhouse. The formal presentation of debutantes takes place at Meymandi Concert Hall in the Martin Marietta Center for the Performing Arts in downtown Raleigh and the ball is held at Carolina Country Club.

The North Carolina Debutante Ball is the only remaining state-wide debutante ball in the United States.

== Notable debutantes ==
- Lucile Aycock McKee, 1936, socialite and president of the Junior League of Raleigh
- Betty Cordon, 1941, socialite
- Mary Johnson Hart, 1929, wife of Julian Deryl Hart
- Mary Lambeth Moore, 1977, writer and podcaster
- Marguerite McKee Moss, 1963, socialite
- Joanna Pearson, 1999, writer and psychiatrist
- Mishew Edgerton Smith, 1953, socialite
- Adrian Thorpe Harrold Wood, 1994, educator, writer, and blogger
