= Historic Oakwood Cemetery =

Cemetery in Wake County, North Carolina

Coordinates: 35°47′12″N 78°37′30″W

- Oakwood Cemetery
- U.S. Historic district – Contributing property
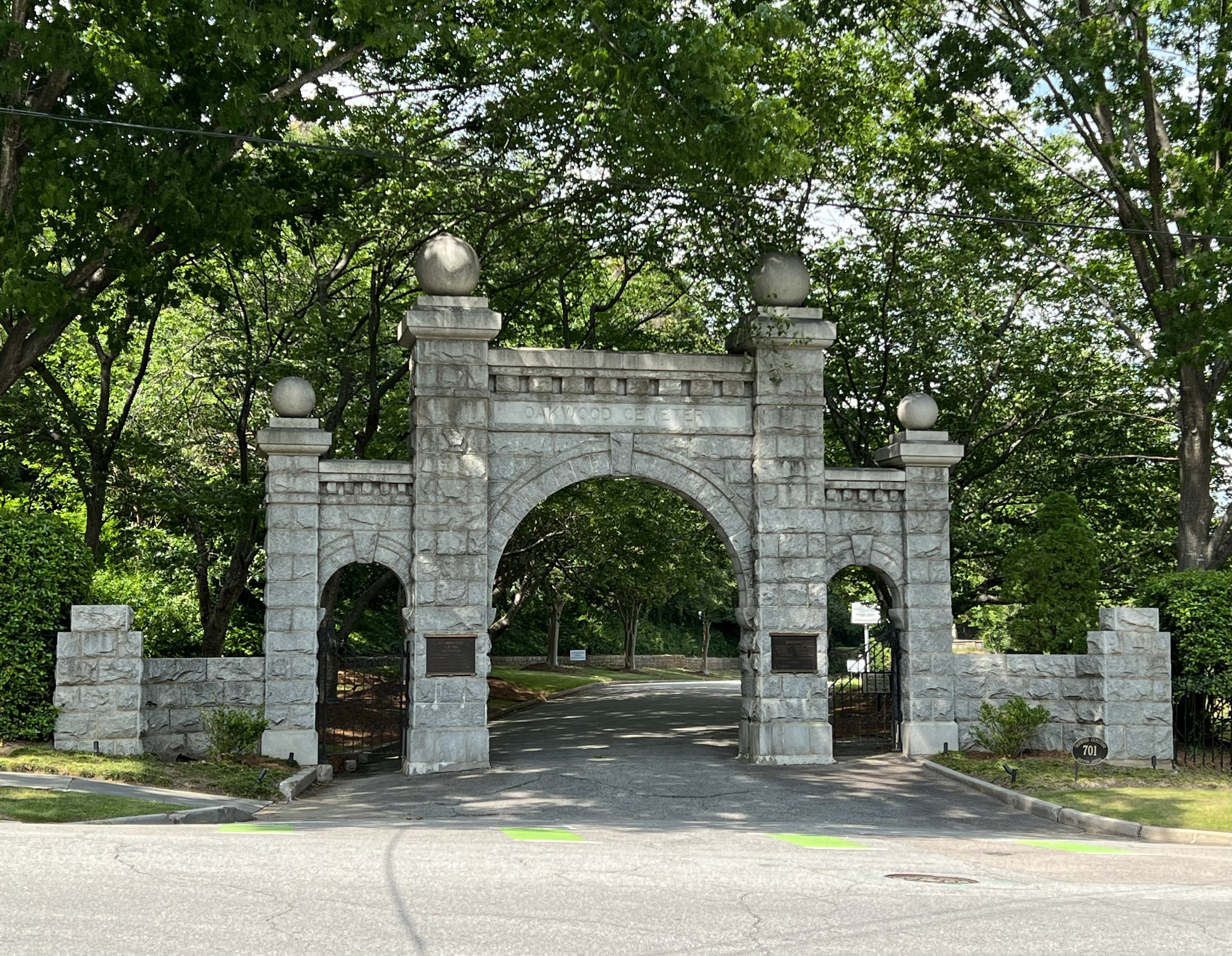
- Oakwood Confederate Cemetery

- Location within North Carolina Location within the United States
- Location: Oakwood Cemetery, Raleigh, North Carolina
- Area: 190 acres (77 ha)
- Part of: Oakwood Historic District (ID74001380)
- Added to NRHP: June 25, 1974

Historic Oakwood Cemetery was founded in 1869 in Raleigh, the state capital of North Carolina, near the North Carolina State Capitol in the city's Historic Oakwood neighborhood. Historic Oakwood Cemetery contains two special areas within its 102 acres (41 ha), the Confederate Cemetery, located on the original two and a half acres (1.0 hectare), and the Hebrew Cemetery, both given for that purpose by Henry Mordecai in 1867.

== Notable burials ==
- George B. Anderson, Confederate Army general
- Charles B. Aycock, Governor of North Carolina
- Cora Lily Woodard Aycock, First Lady of North Carolina and President of the North Carolina Railroad
- Lucile Aycock McKee, president of the Junior League of Raleigh
- George Edmund Badger, U.S. Congressman
- Josiah W. Bailey, U.S. Senator
- John Heritage Bryan, U.S. Congressman
- William Horn Battle, jurist and law professor
- Kemp P. Battle, lawyer, businessman, and educator
- Thomas Bragg, Governor of North Carolina
- Carrie Lougee Broughton, North Carolina State Librarian
- Needham B. Broughton, temperance activist and political figure
- Henry King Burgwyn Jr., Confederate Army officer
- Lorenzo Charles, basketball player
- William Ruffin Cox, Confederate Army general
- Josephus Daniels, Newspaper publisher and political figure
- Elizabeth Edwards, attorney, author, and health care activist
- William G. Enloe, businessman and political figure
- Thad A. Eure, political figure
- Daniel Gould Fowle, Governor of North Carolina
- Thomas Charles Fuller (1832–1901), Confederate politician and judge
- Winder Russell Harris, US Congressman
- Jesse Helms, U.S. Senator
- Robert Hoke, Confederate Army general
- Louisa Virginia Harrison Holden, First Lady of North Carolina
- William Woods Holden, Governor of North Carolina
- Cornelia Petty Jerman, North Carolina suffragist
- Nell Battle Lewis, journalist and lawyer
- Augustus S. Merrimon, U.S. Senator
- Bartholomew F. Moore, North Carolina Attorney General and legislator
- Dan K. Moore, Governor of North Carolina
- Jeanelle C. Moore, First Lady of North Carolina
- Cornelia Alice Norris, socialite, genealogist, and Regent of the Caswell-Nash Chapter of the Daughters of the American Revolution
- Leonidas L. Polk, journalist and political figure
- Edwin G. Reade, U.S. Congressman
- Mishew Edgerton Smith, socialite
- William N. H. Smith, U.S. Congressman
- Willis Smith, U.S. Congressman
- David L. Swain, Governor of North Carolina
- Thomas F. Toon, Confederate Army general
- Jim Valvano, college basketball coach
- Miriam Carson Williams, first woman to serve as President of a U.S-based bank
- Carle Augustus Woodruff, Civil War Medal of Honor recipient
- Jonathan Worth, Governor of North Carolina
- Martitia Daniel Worth, First Lady of North Carolina
