= Junior League =

Volunteer nonprofit organization in the United States

- Predecessor: Junior League for the Promotion of the Settlement Movement, New York Junior League
- Formation: 1901; 125 years ago New York, NY, U.S.
- Founder: Mary Harriman Rumsey
- Founded at: New York City
- Type: Private, 501(c)(3) nonprofit
- Registration no.: 13-1656639
- Headquarters: 80 Maiden Lane; New York, NY 10038
- Members: 140,000 women
- Board Chair: Alice Glenn
- CEO: Melanie Schild
- Key people: Dorothy Payne Whitney (First President, AJLI); Laurel Lee-Alexander (President)
- Subsidiaries: 298 Leagues
- Revenue: $7,195,946 (FY 2019)
- Expenses: $7,035,466 (FY 2019) inc. direct program support as all members serve as unpaid volunteers
- Website: thejuniorleagueinternational.org

The Association of Junior Leagues International, Inc. (Junior League or JL) is a private, nonprofit educational women's volunteer organization aimed at improving communities and the social, cultural, and political fabric of civil society. With 298 Junior League chapters in the United States, Canada, Mexico, and the United Kingdom as of 2024, it is one of the oldest and largest women's groups dedicated to improving society. Members engage in developing civic-leadership skills, fundraising, and volunteering on committees to support partner community organizations related to foster-children, ending domestic violence, fighting human trafficking, illiteracy, city beautification, and other issues. Its mission is to advance women's leadership for meaningful community impact through volunteer action, collaboration, and training.

It was founded in 1901 in New York City by Barnard College debutante Mary Harriman.

== History ==
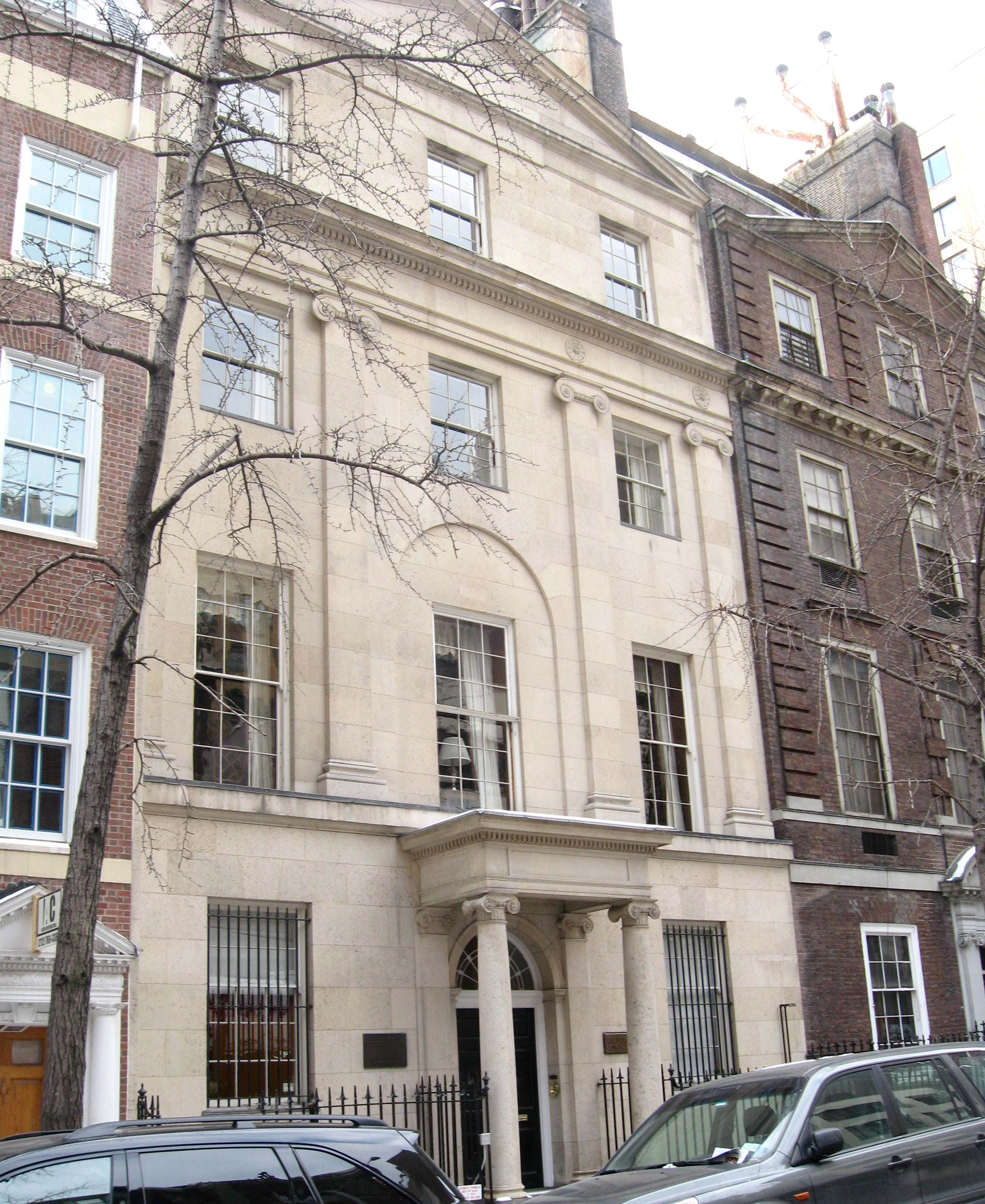
Astor House, clubhouse owned by the New York Junior League (the first League), Upper East Side

The first Junior League was founded in 1901 in New York City as the Junior League for the Promotion of the Settlement Movement. This original chapter is now known as the New York Junior League (NYJL). Its founder was then 19-year-old Barnard College student and debutante Mary Harriman Rumsey, sister of future Governor of New York, W. Averell Harriman, and daughter of railroad executive Edward H. Harriman.

Inspired by a lecture on settlement movements that chronicled the works of social reformers such as Lillian Wald and Jane Addams, Harriman Rumsey organized others to become involved in settlement work. The organization's first project was working at the College Settlement on Rivington Street on Manhattan's Lower East Side. These were the early days of privileged young girls and women leaving their sheltered lives in wealthy neighborhoods to volunteer their time with those who lived in crowded, poverty-stricken areas of cities. This started a legacy of volunteering and social activism that would continue for many decades.

For many years the NYJL's clubhouse was located at 221 East 71st Street in Manhattan. Designed by architect John Russell Pope and opened in 1929, the building contained a swimming pool on the top floor, bedrooms for volunteers, a ballroom, a hairdressing salon, and a shelter for up to 20 abandoned babies. Marymount Manhattan College currently owns the building. In 1950 the NYJL clubhouse moved to the former Vincent Astor townhouse (Astor House) at 130 East 80th Street, where it remains as of 2020.

The League quickly branched out and in 1907 became the Junior League for the Promotion of Neighborhood Work. Under President Dorothy Whitney, the League introduced formal training on "social problems" and expanded the scope of their work to include civic issues such as the civic role for women, police, and immigration (100 Years, 25–26). During this time, a number of sister leagues formed in cities including Brooklyn, New York and Portland, Oregon although there was no formal affiliation with the first New York league. A number of other debutante circles, like the Sewing Circle League of Boston began to emulate the League in New York and focus on local social issues (100 Years, 26). Eleanor Roosevelt was an early member of the NYJL, joining in 1903 when she was 19 years old.

In 1921, thirty Leagues joined to form a national association. Until this point, Leagues were only connected by a Bulletin, containing updates about various leagues, and an annual conference. The national association was named the Association of Junior Leagues of America, Inc. and acted as an umbrella organization (Volunteer, 61). A new Constitution was written, and the Board was tasked with acting as an information bureau for the leagues, as well as continuing to publish the Bulletin and coordinating the annual meeting (100 Years, 47.) After serving as New York City's Junior League president from 1907 to 1910, Dorothy Payne Whitney was nominated as the first president of AJLA. Despite the name, there was membership of Leagues located both in America and Canada at the time of the incorporation (100 Years, 61).

AJLA continued to expand in the number of Leagues and in programming. By the middle of the 20th century, there were over 150 Junior Leagues located in the United States, Canada, and Mexico (100 Years, 10). There was also a noticeable demographic shift in League members. More and more league members were young, working women or were older, suburban housewives as opposed to debutantes (100 Years, 94). In 1985, a Junior League was established in London which was the first League established outside of North America (100 Years, 154–155). This prompted a name change with the organization official becoming the Association of Junior Leagues International, Inc. (History Timeline).

=== Voluntarism ===
The idea that women can meaningfully contribute to solving social issues and bettering communities through voluntarism has been a core tenet of the Junior League since its conception. In the Junior League’s 1906 Annual Report, Harriman Rumsey emphasized the organization’s imperative to alleviate civic ills: "It seems almost inhuman that we should live so close to suffering and poverty ... within a few blocks of our own home and bear no part in this great life" (100 Years, Introduction). This altruistic spirit inspired Harriman Rumsey to organize a group of 80 young women to volunteer for the College Settlement on Rivington Street on the Lower East Side of Manhattan. Every week, League members would teach classes, hand out library books and engage in other enriching activities for children at the settlement house. Eleanor Roosevelt, who joined the Junior League in 1903 and served as League secretary in 1904, also taught dance and calisthenic classes at the Rivington Street Settlement House (100 Years, 21).

The Junior League House for Working Girls (Junior League Hotel) grew out of the organization’s early volunteer work with settlement movements. Dorothy Payne Whitney, president of the New York League from 1907 to 1909, and League members began to engage in conversations around how they might best support working women in the city. There was an interest in creating affordable, sanitary and comfortable accommodations solely for women – an alternative to tenement housing that would also protect against discrimination on the basis of nationality or religion. In 1909, the Junior League erected a six-story building on the corner of 78th street and East End Avenue, which would serve as the Junior League Hotel until its closure in 1931. At a rate of $4 to $7 a week, residents were provided a range of amenities including a library, roof garden, laundry, and tennis and basketball courts. The Junior League Hotel served as a model for Junior Leagues in other cities, many of which sponsored their own residential hotels and services for working women (100 Years, 21).

As Junior Leagues began to crop up in cities across the United States during the 1910s, the organization restated its mission with a focus on bolstering "an interest in all kinds of charitable and social effort" among its members, as well as supporting "already organized philanthropies" (100 Years, 27). This wide-ranging agenda would go on to encompass volunteering efforts around the country related to education, voting rights, child welfare and historic preservation, among other areas.

=== Education reform ===
Over the early years of the League’s development, education emerged as a central aspect of the organization’s efforts to advance social causes. Through the School and Home Visitors program, the League sponsored teachers to assist with bolstering communication between schools and immigrant parents, and by 1909, the League was supplying schools with visiting teachers and volunteer tutors (100 Years, 23). School and Home Visitors, which began as a pilot project, was ultimately so successful that in 1910, New York state absorbed responsibility for the program and expanded its funding and reach. Nathalie Henderson, a League co-founder and chair of the organization’s Committee on Visiting Teachers of the Public Education Society, went on to chair New York’s joint Committee for Education and serve as a trustee at Teachers College, Columbia University (100 Years, 24).

When a League was organized in Brooklyn in 1910, the members petitioned the Board of Education to provide free lunches in public schools and transform vacant lots into playgrounds (100 Years, 26).

This advocacy work continued after World War II, when the Baby Boom created an additional need for resources to support schools, playgrounds, and teachers. With a shortage of teachers, League members volunteered in diagnostic programs and those for gifted and challenged children. By the mid-1950s, over 100 Leagues established public play areas for children (100 Years, 104).

In the 1980s, the Junior League participated in and led several campaigns for literacy. Along with other national organizations, the League joined in PLUS (Project Literacy US), a coordinated effort to expand literacy as a way of preventing against the spread of homelessness (100 Years, 140). Later that decade, First Ladies of the United States and Junior League members Barbara Bush and Laura Bush founded The Barbara Bush Foundation for Family Literacy. The Foundation granted over $6 million to more than 200 Family Literacy Programs across the country in its first decade of operations. Laura Bush spearheaded an initiative in early childhood development to help infants and children get a leg up on reading before entering school (100 Years, 144).

=== Suffrage movement ===
In 1914, the St. Louis Junior League mobilized to support women’s suffrage. They staged a demonstration – what the St. Louis women referred to as a "walkless, talkless parade" - at the 1916 Democratic National Convention, which ultimately resulted in the Democrats voting to include a plank for women's suffrage. The St. Louis League expressed their support in various ways, including reforming the organization as The League of Women Voters, a new group (100 Years, 36).

One year after Congress passed the Nineteenth Amendment to the United States Constitution, the Junior League held its annual conference in St. Louis. With discussions swirling around women’s suffrage at the conference, the League decided to form Legislative committees that would focus on "city or state laws, especially those affecting the social welfare of women and children" (100 Years, 37).

=== Child welfare ===
Junior Leagues have historically advanced causes related to the well-being of women and children in various ways. Leagues across the country pioneered these efforts. Tucson, Arizona established the city’s first day nursery, and Cincinnati established the Junior League Welfare Station, a clinic created to care for the children of indigent families (100 Years, 50). In 1917, members of the New York League organized the first network of volunteers in an outpatient department in New York City through the Children’s Clinic at Bellevue Hospital (100 Years, 38).

During the Great Depression, Junior Leagues ramped up efforts to care for infants, children and families in need. Junior Leagues established and operated milk stations and nurseries for the children of working women, and also ran soup kitchens (100 Years, 65). The Tampa Junior League supported and built out a tuberculosis clinic and treatment center known as the Pine Health Preventorium, through which it provided assistance to 150 children between 1933 and 1934 (100 Years, 65).

=== Childhood immunization ===
In the wake of the 1952 polio epidemic, the Junior League played a critical role in promoting the use of the polio vaccine, discovered by Dr. Jonas Salk, and for advocating for the rehabilitation of polio patients. In recognition for its efforts, the League received the March of Dimes Service Award in 1957 (100 Years, 101).

In the 1990s, the Junior League played a pivotal role in advocating for children to have greater access to health care. In 1991, the League launched Don't Wait to Vaccinate, a public awareness campaign focused on encouraging early childhood immunization (100 Years, 11). All 276 Leagues joined in to distribute information about the importance of vaccination, utilizing multilingual radio announcements, billboards, and handouts to spread the message. Along with these efforts, the Leagues tackled problem areas such as the lack of health clinics, insurance and language barriers that they recognized as factors in preventing wider-spread immunization (100 Years, 101). To eliminate these barriers, Leagues identified the issues that were most relevant to their own local populations and then deployed educational materials and collaborated with health agencies and other Leagues to create effective children’s health programs (100 Years, 161). The success of the Don't Wait campaign garnered widespread attention – President George Bush called the program "a point of light" (100 Years, 166).

=== Public policy & advocacy ===
Despite the Women’s Suffrage movement fueling the establishment of a number of Junior Leagues, the official stance on engaging in public policy efforts for the Association in the early 20th century was to avoid any partisan issues and stay away from public arena (Volunteering, 97–98). The official position of the Association was to focus League energies towards their purpose of fostering interest among their members in the social, economic, educational, cultural and civic conditions of their own communities and to make efficient their volunteer service. The 1930s were rife with disagreements on this issue and eventually a shaky agreement evolved where Leagues could act on public issues locally (Volunteer, 100), however, this would continue to cause debate at League Annual Conferences. Early on Leagues began to form State Public Affairs Committees (SPAC) where Leagues within a state would cooperate on

PACs (Public Affairs Committees), SPACs (State Public Affairs Committees) and LICs (Legislative Issues Committees) are individual, apolitical Junior Leagues or coalitions of Junior Leagues within a state that form to educate and take action on public policy issues relevant to The Junior League Mission. Having begun to take shape in the 1930s, they are collectively governed by their member Leagues and the methods by which they operate vary by state, as do the issues chosen for study and action.

=== Children’s theaters and puppetry ===
Junior Leagues played an important role in spreading children’s theater across the United States, both as a form of community service for League members and as way of introducing live-performance to children who might not have experienced it otherwise. The Junior League of Chicago was the first to stage children’s theater in 1921, and by 1929, it hosted "America’s first conference on children’s theater" (100 Years, 57). Following the conference, the Junior League of Chicago produced a national tour of The Blue Bird by Maurice Maeterlinck, which was staged in 15 cities and seen by 35,000 children.

While children’s theater started in Chicago, it quickly spread to Leagues across the country. By 1931, children’s plays were staged by 80 Leagues, and almost all of the 148 Leagues put on some form of children’s theater, marionette or puppet shows by 1938. The Junior League of Chicago even had a presence at the Chicago’s World Fair where they presented weekly shows over a four-month run (100 Years, 57).

As children’s theater grew into a national movement, it eventually evolved into other mediums like radio and television as well. The popular children’s television show Kukla, Fran and Ollie originated from puppet shows staged in Chicago by Burr Tillstrom and the Junior League in the 1940s (100 Years, 59). Fred Rogers’ daily television program The Children’s Corner was developed with help from the League, and Margaret Hamilton, who would go on to play the Wicked Witch of the West in The Wizard of Oz, got her start in children’s theater as a member of the Junior League (100 Years, 60).

In addition to providing enriching entertainment, Leagues were also cognizant of the comfort that theater could bring to children during times of uncertainty. From 1944 to 1945, Leagues put on 783 theater performances for nearly 370,000 children. And in the last year of the second World War, Leagues staged 36 live radio programs for children (100 Years, 87).

=== Museums ===
Junior Leagues were also involved in opening children’s museums with the goal to expose children to science and technology, art and nature. By the end of the 1950s, Leagues across the country – from San Francisco to Jacksonville, Florida – established or entered into partnerships to open up museums for children in their own communities (100 Years, 102). The Denver Junior League was the first to open a children’s museum in 1945. Co-sponsored by the Denver Art Museum, the Denver Children’s Museum was such a success that its opening weekend brought in 10,000 visitors. Ultimately the museum served as a pilot project, both for the nation and for the United Nations Educational, Scientific and Cultural Organization (UNESCO) (100 Years, 103).

Many other Leagues followed the example set by the Denver Children’s Museum. In 1950, the Junior League of Miami opened the Junior Museum of Miami, a small house that brought in more 2,000 children in its first three months and eventually evolved into the Miami Museum of Science. League members also mobilized to secure funds and necessary resources for children’s museums. In 1946, the Junior League of Charlotte stepped in to save a small but popular Children’s Nature Museum thought up by a local school teacher from financial ruin. The League staged a fashion show, barbershop quartet, and follies to raise funds, eventually securing enough resources to take over an abandoned day nursery for a nature center. By 1951, the League pitched in to help the museum move into a larger, $68,000 building (100 Years, 103).

In 1959, the Junior League of the Palm Beaches founded and incorporated the South Florida Science Museum, today known as the Cox Science Center and Aquarium. The museum opened in 1961, and in 1964 added a new wing housing the planetarium which was dedicated by and named after astronaut Buzz Aldrin.

In addition to opening new museums, Leagues also worked with existing museums to support children-friendly sections. This was the case for the "Please Touch" Gallery at the Museum of the City of New York, which was staffed by volunteers and financed by the League (100 Years, 103).

Beyond the 1950s, the Leagues continued to meet the needs of communities around the country by opening children’s museums. In 1976, the Junior League of Pittsburgh contributed to the founding of the Pittsburgh Children’s Museum, and in 1982, the Junior League of Chicago organized around fighting cutbacks in funding for the city’s public schools by helping to establish the Chicago Children’s Museum.

In 1961, the Junior League of Chicago co-founded the Art Institute's volunteer Docent Program to revitalize and expand "programming for children."

In 2017, the Association of Children’s Museums granted the 2017 ACM Great Friend to Kids Award to the Junior League in recognition of the organization’s contributions to advocating for children and their education and for their work developing children’s museums.

=== World War efforts ===
When World War I broke out in Europe in 1914, the Junior League of Montreal was the first to spring into action, initially by raising money for refugees. Almost all Leagues in the U.S. became involved by 1916, despite the nation’s stated neutrality which lasted until April 1917 (timeline). In addition to fundraising efforts, Leagues organized classes, including those focused on home nursing, as well as "preparedness" initiatives that were often organized in coordination with the Red Cross (100 Years, 39).

Perhaps even more so than the first world war, World War II galvanized Junior Leagues into action. In July 1940, as awareness spread that the United States would join the war, the AJLA called a special meeting to mobilize all Leagues in the United States to form central volunteer bureaus. This movement built off of capabilities already developed during the Depression that matched volunteers with agencies in need of help. In August 1941, all Leagues were sent a plan for organizing community volunteer initiatives entitled "A Central Volunteer Bureau in Defense," a plan for coordinating community volunteer efforts (100 Years, 80).

The Junior League of the Palm Beaches grew out of the World War II effort when 15 women established a Junior Welfare League in 1941, focused on supporting the WWII training bases that had opened in Palm Beach County. The women hosted canteen events for soldiers and worked with the Red Cross.

In the United States and Canada, volunteer efforts for the war took on many different forms. Junior League members organized blood drives, worked for the Red Cross, volunteered in daycare centers, sold US Treasury War Bonds and Stamps, and performed for servicemen at the USO and other venues (100 Years, 86). Overseas, League Members volunteered with various organizations, including an 125-person unit of Junior League Members who served with the YMCA in France (100 Years, 80).

As volunteerism flourished, Junior League members also took on more official responsibilities in war efforts. It was through the work of Oveta Culp Hobby, member of the Houston Junior League and Director of the Women’s Interest Section of the War Department, that the Women’s Auxiliary Army Corps (WAAC) was formed in 1941. After President Roosevelt signed the bill establishing the WAAC, Hobby was promoted to Major Hobby. As director, Major Hobby was charged with mobilizing and training women to be soldiers, and, "making available to the national defense the knowledge, skill, and special training of the women of the nation" (100 Years, 84).

The WAACs under Major Hobby’s charge initially took on roles ranging from clerks and secretaries to aircraft warning observers. However, as the war progressed, WAACs assumed a broader range of primarily communication and clerical responsibilities overseas. By 1943, the initiative had garnered such success that the WAAC was elevated to Regular Army and afforded pay and privileges equal to what was granted to male soldiers (100 Years, 85).

=== Culinary arts ===
Junior League chapters have produced a number of cookbooks. The New York Junior League's cookbooks include New York Entertains (1974), I'll Taste Manhattan (1994), and the 120th Anniversary Cookbook (2021). The Junior League of Augusta's cookbooks include the three volume, The Masters golf tournament themed Tea-Time at the Masters series: Tea-Time at the Masters (1977), Second Round: Tea-Time at the Masters (1988), and Par 3: Tea-Time at the Masters (2005). Some book collectors have taken to collecting cookbooks from various chapters of the Junior League.

The Masters golf tournament features a concession stand that is well known for certain menu items, including its pimento cheese sandwiches. The Par 3: Tea-Time at the Masters includes a recipe for "Four-Cheese Pimento Sandwiches" which is said to resemble the ones served at The Masters.

=== Skills development ===
Members of The Junior League obtain knowledge, skills, and experiences in areas such as: Leadership, Organizational development, Community needs assessment, Mentoring, Advocacy, Communications, Fund development, Strategic planning, Negotiation, Consensus-building, and Networking.

== Development ==
=== Mission ===
"The Association of Junior Leagues International, Inc. (AJLI) is an organization of women whose mission is to advance women's leadership for meaningful community impact through volunteer action, collaboration, and training. Its purpose is exclusively educational and charitable."

=== Chartered Leagues ===
As of 2025 there are approximately 300 Leagues of 140,000 women in the United States, Canada, France, Mexico, the UK, and Kenya. including but not limited to:

Alabama

- Junior League of Mobile

Arizona

- Junior League of Phoenix
- Junior League of Tucson

California

- Junior League of Bakersfield
- Junior League of Fresno
- Junior League of Long Beach
- Junior League of Los Angeles
- Junior League of Monterey County
- Junior League of Napa-Sonoma
- Junior League of Oakland-East Bay
- Junior League of Orange County
- Junior League of Palo Alto-Mid Peninsula
- Junior League of Pasadena
- Junior League of Riverside
- Junior League of Sacramento
- Junior League of San Diego
- Junior League of San Francisco
- Junior League of San Joaquin County
- Junior League of San Jose
- Junior League of Santa Barbara

Canada

- Junior League of Montreal
- Junior League of Toronto
- Junior League of Hamilton-Burlington
- Junior League of Calgary

Florida

- Junior League of Jacksonville
- Junior League of Indian River
- Junior League of Orlando
- Junior League of Manatee County
- Junior League of Miami
- Junior League of the Palm Beaches
- Junior League of Pensacola
- Junior League of Sarasota
- Junior League of Tallahassee
- Junior League of Tampa
- Junior League of Clearwater Dunedin
- Junior League of St. Petersburg

Georgia

- Junior League of Augusta
- Junior League of Gainesville-Hall County

Hawai'i

- Junior League of Honolulu

Idaho

- Junior League of Boise

Illinois

- Junior League of Chicago
- Junior League of Evanston-North Shore
- Junior League of Springfield

Massachusetts

- Junior League of Boston Inc.
- Junior League of Greater Springfield

Michigan

- Junior League of Detroit
- Junior League of Grand Rapids
- Junior League of Birmingham
- Junior League of Ann Arbor
- Junior League of Flint
- Junior League of Kalamazoo
- Junior League of Great Lakes Bay Region

Minnesota

- Junior League of Duluth
- Junior League of Greater Mankato
- Junior League of Minneapolis
- Junior League of Saint Paul

Mississippi

- Junior League of Jackson

Missouri

- Junior League of Kansas City

New York

- Junior League of Brooklyn
- Junior League of Buffalo
- Junior League of Rochester
- New York Junior League
- Junior League of Kingston
- Junior League of Long Island
- Junior League of Schenectady and Saratoga Counties
- Junior League of Pelham

New Jersey

- Junior League of Princeton
- Junior League of Summit
- Junior League of Morristown
- Junior League of Montclair-Newark

North Carolina

- Junior League of Asheville
- Junior League of Wilmington, N.C.
- Junior League of Raleigh
- Junior League of Greensboro
- Junior League of Winston-Salem
- Junior League of Charlotte
- Junior League of Durham and Orange Counties

Ohio

- Junior League of Akron
- Junior League of Cleveland
- Junior League of Cincinnati
- Junior League of Columbus
- Junior League of Dayton
- Junior League of Toledo

Oregon

- Junior League of Portland

Pennsylvania

- Junior League of Philadelphia
- Junior League of Scranton

Texas

- Junior League of Dallas
- Junior League of Houston
- Junior League of Austin

Utah

- Junior League of Salt Lake City
- Junior League of Ogden

Virginia

- Junior League of Hampton Roads
- Junior League of Norfolk-Virginia Beach
- Junior League of Richmond
- Junior League of Roanoke Valley

Washington

- Junior League of Lower Columbia
- Junior League of Olympia
- Junior League of Seattle
- Junior League of Spokane
- Junior League of Tacoma

Wisconsin

- Junior League of Eau Claire
- Junior League of Madison
- Junior League of Milwaukee
- Junior League of Racine

UK

- Junior League of London

=== Membership ===
The Junior League is an all-women organization. In 1996, the Los Angeles Times, The Washington Post, Chicago Tribune, and San Francisco Gate publicized that a male hairdresser named Clark Clementsen tried to join the League after his "high society clients" recommended him, but was denied membership and retained an attorney to argue his case at a meeting of AJLI representatives in NYC. For him, members had "been trained to be organized, articulate community leaders, and it showed...no men's organization even came close."

=== Fundraisers and advocacy ===
The Junior League has a full calendar year of members-only, family-friendly, and public events at their clubhouses and local venues such as hotels. Notable JL events raising money for partner community organizations related to foster children, domestic violence, human trafficking, illiteracy, city beautification, and other issues include, but are not limited to:

- Annual Winter Ball—the Junior League's largest fundraiser since 1952, where League awards are given to honor outstanding members and a public figure.
- Annual Thanksgiving Eve Ball—introducing debutantes to society at The Plaza and Waldorf-Astoria since 1948
- Savor the Spring Restaurant Week
- Spring House Tour
- Team JL at the New York City Marathon

Other JL initiatives include its contributions to the passage of the Clean Water Act, free school lunch campaign, "Don’t Wait to Vaccinate" campaign, and The Junior Leagues’ Kids in the Kitchen initiative, which combats childhood obesity and educates families on health and nutrition.

== Notable League members ==
As of 2020, five first ladies of the U.S. have been Junior League members.

Politics and government

- Ann Bedsole— First female Alabama State Senator (1983–1995)
- Margot Birmingham— Wife of 1992 / 1996 Presidential Candidate and businessman, Ross Perot
- Florence Bird— Canadianes Senator appointed by Pierre Trudeau (1978–1983), broadcaster, and journalist
- Pam Bondi— First female Attorney General of Florida (2011–2019) and 87th United States Attorney General (2025– Present)
- Jeanne Milliken Bonds— First female Mayor of Knightdale, North Carolina (2002–2007) and Regional Manager at the Federal Reserve Bank of Richmond
- Susan Brooks— U.S. Representative for Indiana's 5th congressional district (2013–2021), United States Attorney for Southern District of Indiana (2001–2007)
- Barbara Bush— 41st First Lady during George H. W. Bush administration (1989–1993)
- Laura Bush— 43rd First Lady during George W. Bush administration (2001–2009)
- Oveta Culp Hobby— First United States Secretary of the Department of Health, Education and Welfare (1953–1955), first Director of the Women's Army Corps (1942–1945)
- Pat Evans— Three-term Mayor of Plano, Texas (2002–2009)
- Betty Ford— 38th First Lady during Gerald Ford administration (1974–1977)
- Tillie Fowler— U.S. Representative for Florida's 4th congressional district (1993–2001)
- DeDreana Freeman— Member of the Durham City Council (2017– Present) and Co-Founder of Episcopalians United Against Racism
- Judith Giuliani (née Nathan)— Wife of 107th Mayor of New York City, Rudolph Giuliani, and founding Board Member of the Twin Towers Fund
- Margaret Hance— first female Mayor of Phoenix, Arizona (1976–1984)
- Glenda Hood— Secretary of State of Florida (2003–2005) and first female Mayor of Orlando, Florida (1992–2003)
- Margaret McTavish Konantz— Member of Canadian Parliament for Winnipeg South (1963–1965), first woman from Manitoba elected to the House of Commons
- Mary Pillsbury Lord— Successor to Eleanor Roosevelt as the U.S. representative to the United Nations Commission on Human Rights (1953–1961), U.S. Delegate to the United Nations General Assembly (1958 and 1960)
- Jocelyn Mitnaul Mallette— Secretary of the North Carolina Department of Military and Veterans Affairs
- Stephanie Malone— Arkansas House of Representatives member (2009–2015)
- Carolyn Maloney— U.S. Representative for New York (14th congressional district: 1993–2013; 12th congressional district: 2013-2023), first female Chair of the Joint Economic Committee (2019–2020), first female Chair of the House Oversight Committee (2019–2023)
- Doris Matsui— U.S. Representative for California's 7th Congressional District (2005– Present)
- Bonnie McElveen-Hunter— 29th U.S. Ambassador to Finland (2001–2003), first female Chairman of the Board of Governors of the American Red Cross (2004– Present), founder and CEO of Pace Communications
- Geanie Morrison— Texas House of Representatives member (1999– Present)
- Willie Landry Mount— Louisiana State Senator (2000–2012), first female Mayor of Lake Charles, Louisiana (1993–1999)
- Sandra Day O'Connor— First female Associate Justice of the U.S. Supreme Court (1981–2006) appointed by Ronald Reagan
- Diane Patrick— Texas House of Representatives member (2007– 2015) and Texas State Board of Education member (1992–1996)
- Nancy Reagan— 40th First Lady during Ronald Reagan administration (1981–1989), United Nations Delegate and founder of the "Just Say No" drug awareness campaign (launched in 1982), American Film Actress
- Eleanor Roosevelt— 32nd First Lady during Franklin D. Roosevelt administration (1933–1945), United States Delegate to the United Nations General Assembly advocating for international support for the Universal Declaration of Human Rights (1945–1952)
- Margaret Chase Smith— First female to serve in both houses of the United States Congress - first as a U.S. Representative (1940–1949), then as a U.S. Senator from Maine (1949–1973)
- Bobbie Sparrow— Canadian politician; Member of Parliament for Calgary Southwest (1984–1993), Minister of Energy, Mines, and Resources (1993) and Minister of Forestry (1993)
- Carole Keeton Strayhorn— First female Mayor of Austin, Texas (1977–1983), first female Railroad Commissioner of Texas (1994–1999), and first female Comptroller of Texas (1999–2007)
- Deborah Taylor Tate— Commissioner of the Federal Communications Commission (FCC) (2006–2009), Director of the Administrative Office for the Courts (AOC) for the Tennessee Supreme Court (2015–2022)
- Margaret Hicks Williams— U.S. Department of War Official and American author specialized in international affairs

Business

- Martha Rivers Ingram— Chairman and CEO of Ingram Industries following the death of her husband, E. Bronson Ingram II; philanthropist and patron of the arts

Entertainment, media, literature, and fashion

- Julia Child— Emmy Award Winning Television personality chef and author of Mastering the Art of French Cooking
- Betty Cordon— American socialite, model, and philanthropist
- Ruth Draper— American actress and dramatist
- Margaret Hamilton— Actress, best known for her portrayal of the Wicked Witch of the West in The Wizard of Oz (1939)
- Katharine Hepburn— Four-time Academy Award winning Actress, known for her iconic roles in The African Queen (1951) and On Golden Pond (1981)
- Marguerite McKee Moss— Socialite and lead debutante at the 1963 North Carolina Debutante Ball
- Ethma Odum— Pioneer Female Television personality in Alexandria, Louisiana, Producer and Host of The Ethma Odum Show
- Helenka Adamowska Pantaleoni— Silent film actress and founding director of the U.S. Committee for UNICEF
- Suzanne Perron— New Orleans-based couture fashion designer
- Mena Webb— American Writer, Columnist at The Herald-Sun, and Editor
- Eudora Welty— Pulitzer Prize winning author of The Optimist's Daughter (1972)
- Mishew Edgerton Smith— Socialite and lead debutante at the 1953 North Carolina Debutante Ball
- Shirley Temple— American Actress, UN Delegate, U.S. Ambassador to Czechoslovakia (1989–1992)

Military

- Jeannie Deakyne— Army Officer in the Iraq War (1998–2001); Bronze Star Medal and Combat Action Badge recipient
- Cornelia Fort— First female pilot in American history to die on active duty
- Julie Roland— aviator and lieutenant commander in the United States Navy

Nonprofit and philanthropy

- Carol Jenkins Barnett— President of Publix Super Markets Charities and Philanthropist
- Elizabeth Carter Bogardus— Founder of the Junior League of Honolulu (1923)
- Kathleen Price Bryan— Philanthropist, founder of the Junior League of Greensboro (1926)
- Cornelia Keeble Ewing— Philanthropist, founder of the Junior League of Nashville (1922)
- Lucile Aycock McKee— Socialite and sixth president of the Junior League of Raleigh
- Mary Harriman— Founder of the Junior League in 1901, Chair of the Consumer Advisory Board of the National Recovery Administration
- Dorothy Payne Whitney— Whitney family member, philanthropist, and first president of the Association of Junior Leagues International (1921)
- Sally Dalton Robinson— American philanthropist and civic leader in Charlotte, North Carolina, founder of the Levine Museum of the New South
- Jeanne Fox Weinmann (1874–1962), president national of the U.S. Daughters of 1812 and president general of the United Daughters of the Confederacy

Sports

- Sarah Palfrey Cooke— American tennis player inducted in the International Tennis Hall of Fame for winning 18 titles
- Marjory Gengler— Ranked number one female Tennis player in the Eastern United States as a Princeton Student and competed at Wimbledon (1972)
- Kerri Strug— U.S.Olympic Gold medalist in gymnastics (1996) and White House correspondent
