= 26th North Carolina Infantry Regiment =

Infantry regiment of the Confederate States Army

- North Carolina State flag circa 1861
- Active: August 27, 1861, to April 19, 1865
- Country: Confederate States of America
- Allegiance: North Carolina
- Branch: Confederate States Army
- Type: Infantry
- Role: Infantry
- Engagements: Capture of the U.S.S. Union; Battle of New Bern; Seven Days Battles; Battle of Oak Grove; Battle of Malvern Hill; Skirmish at Little Creek; Skirmish at Rawl's Mill; Battle at Fort Anderson; Barrington's Ferry; Battle of Washington; Battle of Gettysburg; Battle of Williamsport; Bristoe Campaign; Battle of Bristoe Station; Overland Campaign; Battle of the Wilderness; Battle of Spotsylvania Court House; Battle of Yellow Tavern; Battle of North Anna; Battle of Cold Harbor; Battle of Globe Tavern; Second Battle of Ream's Station; Battle of Vaughan Road; Battle of Peebles' Farm; Battle of Boydton Plank Road; Stony Creek Raid; Battle of Hatcher's Run; Siege of Petersburg; Battle of Five Forks; Battle of Appomattox Court House

Commanders
- Colonel: Zebulon Baird Vance
- Colonel: Henry K. Burgwyn
- Colonel: John Randolph Lane
- Lt. Colonel: John Thomas Jones,
- Lt. Colonel: James Theophilus Adams

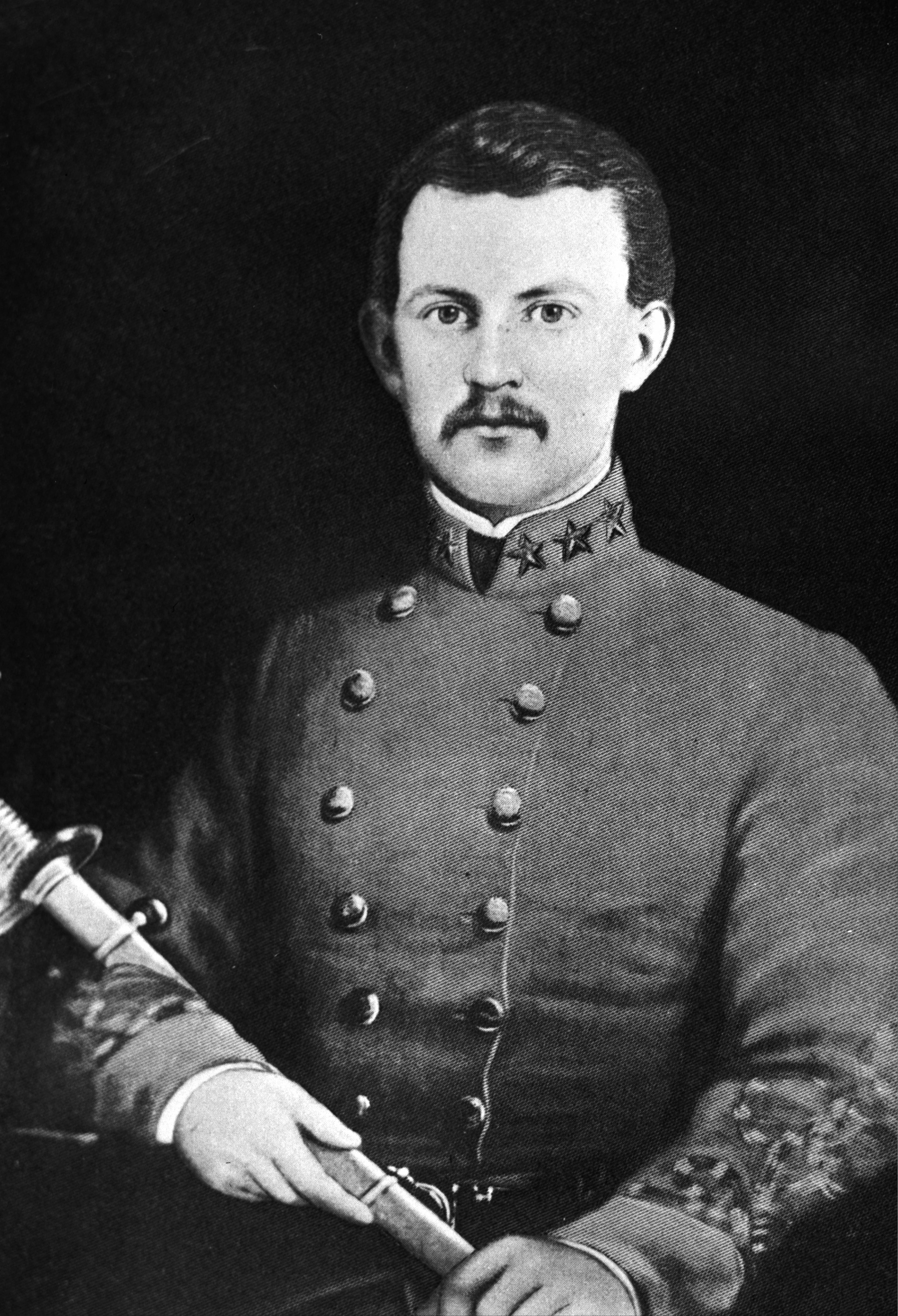
Henry King Burgwyn, Jr., one of the youngest colonels of the American Civil War who died at the age of twenty-one at the Battle of Gettysburg

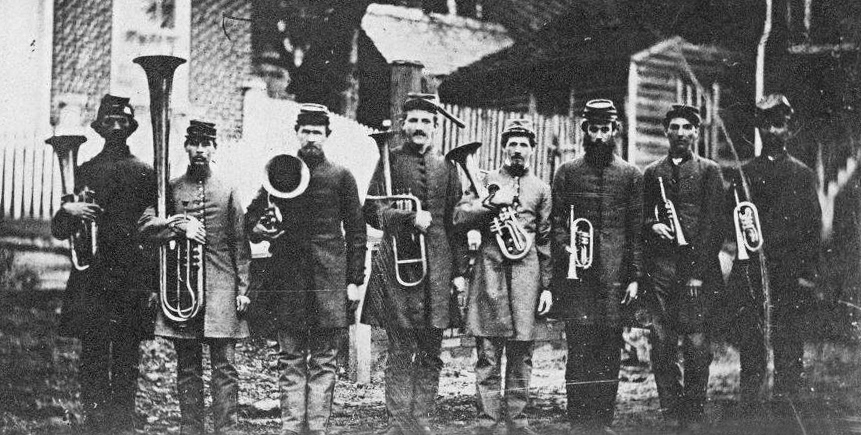
The 26th North Carolina Regimental Band. As it appears, from left to right: S. T. Mickey, A. P. Gibson, J. O. Hall, W. H. Hall, A. L. Hauser, D. T. Crouse, J. A. Leinbach, and James M. Fisher.

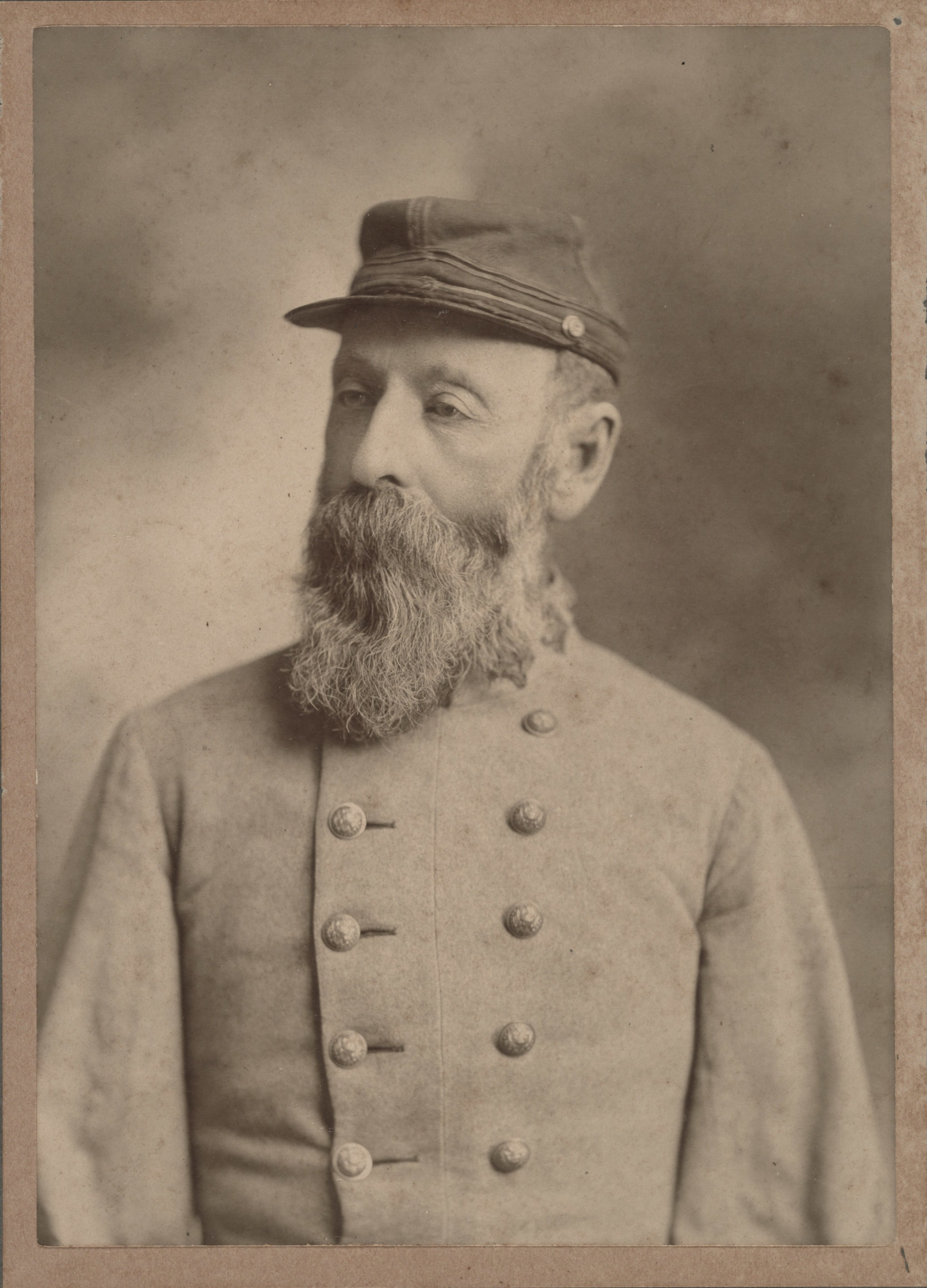
Confederate veteran Colonel John Randolph Lane of Field and Staff, 26th North Carolina Infantry Regiment. From the Liljenquist Family Collection of Civil War Photographs, Prints and Photographs Division, Library of Congress

The 26th North Carolina Infantry Regiment was an infantry regiment of the Confederate States Army during the American Civil War. The regiment was composed of ten companies that came from various counties across North Carolina and Virginia.

== Organization and muster ==
The state of North Carolina seceded from the Union on May 20, 1861, and subsequently joined the Confederate States of America. After seceding, then North Carolina Adjutant General John Hoke called for 30,000 troops to be recruited to support the Confederacy in the war. Congressman Zebulon Baird Vance initially supported the Union but after hearing of the attacks on Fort Sumter, he then advocated for the Confederacy. In local towns people then tried to form companies who would then enter into state service. To encourage enlistment, the state offered a $10 bounty for any man who enlisted into a company. The soldiers in each of the ten companies that made up the 26th North Carolina came primarily from one county, while a few usually came from neighboring counties.

The first company to form as a part of the 26th North Carolina was from Moore County in May 1861. Nine more companies followed suit with soldiers coming from the following counties in North Carolina: Ashe, Union, Wilkes, Wake, Chatham, Caldwell, and Anson. One company also contained soldiers from Grayson County in Virginia. Each of the ten companies had their own nickname that they chose.

The respective companies, the men included are listed as their final ranks.

- Company A - Jeff Davis Mountaineers, Ashe County, Capt. Aras Cox, Capt. Andrew McMillan, Capt. Samuel Wagg, Capt. Ambrose Duvall.
- Company B - Waxhaw Jackson Guards, Union County, Capt. J.C. John Steele, Capt. William Wilson, Capt. Thomas Cureton.
- Company C - Wilkes Volunteers, Wilkes County, Maj. Abner Carmicheal (entered as a Captain, left as a Major), Capt. Alexander Horton, Capt. Thomas Ferguson, Capt. Isaac Jarratt.
- Company D - Wake Guards, Wake County, Capt. Oscar Rand.
- Company E - (Chatham) Independent Guard, Chatham County, Capt. William Webster, Capt. Stephen Brewer.
- Company F - Hibriten Guards, Caldwell County, Maj (entered as Captain, left as Major). Nathaniel Rankin, Capt. Joseph Ballew, Capt. Romulus Tuttle.
- Company G - Chatham Boys, Chatham County, Col. John Lane (entered as Capt.), Capt. William MacLean, Capt. Henry Albright, Capt, Austin Johnson.
- Company H - Moore Independents, Moore County, Capt. William Martin, Capt. Clement Dowd, Capt. James McIver
- Company I - Caldwell Guards, Caldwell County, Capt. Wilson White.
- Company K - Pee Dee Wild Cat, Anson County, Capt. James Caraway, Capt. John McLauchlin, Capt. Thomas Lilly.

== History ==
The regiment was raised in 1861 from central and western North Carolina, with Zebulon B. Vance as its first colonel. Vance was elected Governor of North Carolina in 1862 and command of the unit passed to 20-year-old Col. Henry King Burgwyn, Jr. The 26th spent the next year defending the North Carolina coast, seeing its first action at New Bern, North Carolina. It then went north and fought in the Seven Days Battles before returning to the North Carolina coast.

In 1863, it marched northwards and became attached to General Robert E. Lee's Army of Northern Virginia where they were given the distinction of being not only the largest, but the best trained regiment present. Gen.Pettigrew's brigade was attached to the 3rd Corps led by A.P. Hill.

From there the 26th North Carolina marched ever northward in Maryland and later into Pennsylvania. On July 1, 1863, the 26th North Carolina became engaged in the Battle of Gettysburg, fighting at McPherson's Ridge. The regiment suffered heavy casualties during a fight with the "Iron Brigade"'s 24th Michigan Volunteer Infantry Regiment (which suffered the second most casualties of any Union regiment at Gettysburg—only the 1st Minnesota suffered more), losing Burgwyn, the lieutenant colonel, and 588 men out of a strength of 800, but forced the 24th into a retreat. Out of 800 men taken into battle, it had 86 men killed and 502 wounded. Another 120-136 soldiers would be lost in the tragic Pickett's Charge on July 3. A marker stands near where the regiment fought and bled.

The second day of Gettysburg was resting near McPherson's Ridge. Pettrigrew and the surviving officers worked to bring men not severely wounded back into the ranks. On the last day of the battle, the 26th were chosen to take part in the Pettigrew/Pickett's Charge on Cemetery Ridge, it was second from the left in the brigade's line. The 26th North Carolina suffered artillery fire and then small arms fire as it advanced. The regiment lost an additional 120 men, and the regimental flag was captured. The regiment suffered more casualties than any other regiment, Union or Confederate, during the battle, including the entire Company F being killed or wounded. There is some controversy over whether the Carolinians penetrated the federal line, but they were among the last troops repelled.

Later in the war, the regiment fought during the Overland Campaign and Siege of Petersburg, and remained in the Army of Northern Virginia until its surrender at Appomattox, Virginia on April 9, 1865. Maj, later LTC, John Jones led the regiment at the Battle of Bristoe Station. LTC John Randolph Lane was promoted to Col while recovering from his Gettysburg wound. He took charge of the regiment in late 1863. Lane was wounded again in the Battle of the Wilderness on May 5, 1864. LTC Jones was mortally wounded a day later. Lane was wounded twice more during the war and was sent home to recover in the spring of 1865. Consequently, he was absent from the final campaign of the Army of Northern Virginia.

== See also ==
- List of North Carolina Confederate Civil War units
