= Cornelia Petty Jerman =

- Born: Cornelia Petty; 1 December 1874; Carthage, North Carolina
- Died: 3 February 1946 (aged 71)
- Known for: American suffragist and Democratic Party official
- Political party: Democratic Party

Cornelia Petty Jerman (December 1, 1874 – February 3, 1946) was an American suffragist and Democratic Party official, based in North Carolina.

== Early life and education ==
Cornelia Petty was born near Carthage, North Carolina. Her parents were William Carey Petty and Emma Virginia Thagard Petty. Her father was a railroad executive. She earned a degree from Oxford Female College in North Carolina (class of 1892), and pursued further studies in voice at the New England Conservatory of Music in Boston.

== Career and activism ==
Cornelia Petty Jerman was president of the Woman's Club of Raleigh (1909-1911), and oversaw construction of the club's first and second buildings. She also served as president of the North Carolina Federation of Women's Clubs. She was among the organizers of the Raleigh Equal Suffrage League. In 1919, she became vice-president of the North Carolina Equal Suffrage League. After suffrage was won, she remained active in politics, organized and led the Raleigh League of Women Voters.

In 1920, Jerman was the first woman to serve as a North Carolina delegate to the Democratic National Convention. Jerman was president of the Legislative Council of North Carolina Women from 1922 to 1933. She was vice president of North Carolina's Democratic State Convention in 1922, and was the first woman delegate to address a Democratic state convention. She was appointed to the Democratic National Committee in 1928, and campaigned for both Al Smith and Franklin D. Roosevelt.

Jerman held a federal post in North Carolina under Franklin D. Roosevelt, as assistant collector of Internal Revenue. She was also on the board of directors of two banks, and of the Women's National Democratic Club.

== Personal life ==
Cornelia Petty married banker and businessman Thomas Palmer Jerman in 1898. They had a son, Thomas Palmer Jerman, Jr. (1906-1974) and a daughter Lucy, who died in childhood. She also raised her niece, Carey Petty, from infancy. She was widowed in 1911, and died in 1946, age 71. Her remains were buried at Historic Oakwood Cemetery in Raleigh.

A small collection of Jerman's papers is archived at East Carolina University.
