= Restaurants & Institutions =

- Type: business magazine
- Format: Paper and online magazine
- Owner(s): Reed Business Information
- Editor: Patricia Dailey
- Founded: 1937
- Language: English
- Ceased publication: April 2010
- Headquarters: Oak Brook, Illinois, United States
- Circulation: 130,000
- ISSN: 0273-5520

Restaurants & Institutions (R&I) (ISSN 0273-5520) was a trade publication and web site owned by Reed Business Information serving the information needs of foodservice professionals at chains, independent restaurants, hotels and institutions.

The editor-in-chief was Patricia Dailey.

Established in 1937, R&I magazine was published semimonthly.

R&I's typical content included food trends, menu development ideas, new products and insights. In May, R&I hosted the Ivy awards, where they honored exemplary restaurants and foodservice operators. Restaurants & Institutions also ranked the Top 400 restaurant chains each year, providing an industry score card and comparative overview.

As of June 2008, total BPA audited circulation was 130,000 subscribers.

The magazine's last issue was published in April 2010, when its publisher Reed Elsevier announced it would cease operation given the weak US economy and drop in ad sales.
