= Lucile Aycock McKee =

American socialite (1919–2013)

President of the Junior League of Raleigh, North Carolina
- In office 1954–1955
- Preceded by: Dorothy Dillon Mann
- Succeeded by: Alice Poe Yates

Personal details
- Born: March 30, 1919 Warsaw, North Carolina, U.S.
- Died: November 24, 2013 (aged 94) Raleigh, North Carolina, U.S.
- Resting place: Historic Oakwood Cemetery
- Spouse: James McKee (m. 1942; died 2001)
- Children: 2 (including Marguerite McKee Moss)
- Education: St. Mary's Junior College; Meredith College
- Occupation: Socialite

Lucile Best Aycock McKee (March 30, 1919 – November 24, 2013) was an American socialite who served as the sixth president of the Junior League of Raleigh, North Carolina from 1954 to 1955. She was the granddaughter of Governor Charles Brantley Aycock.

== Early life, family, and education ==
McKee was born Lucile Best Aycock on March 30, 1919, to Lucile Harrison Best Aycock and William Benjamin Aycock at the home of her maternal grandparents, Hulda Walston Best and Lucius Pender Best, in Warsaw, North Carolina. Her paternal grandparents were North Carolina governor Charles Brantley Aycock and First Lady Cora Lily Woodard Aycock.

She was educated in Raleigh public schools before graduating from St. Mary's Junior College and Meredith College. She attended graduate school at North Carolina State University and studied vocational guidance at Duke University.

== Adult life ==
In 1936, she was presented to society at the North Carolina Debutante Ball, where she was selected as the lead debutante.

On August 22, 1942, she married James McKee, the executive vice president of the North Carolina Products Corporation. They had two daughters, Lucile and Marguerite. In 1955, the family moved into a house in Hayes Barton Historic District.

She was a member of the Junior League of Raleigh and served as the league's sixth president from 1954 to 1955.

Aycock was Episcopalian and a member of Christ Church.

She died on November 24, 2013.
