= Cornelia Deaderick Glenn =

First Lady of North Carolina

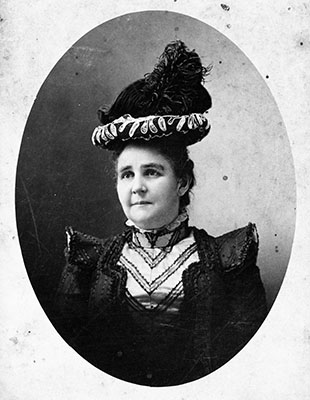

First Lady of North Carolina
- In role January 11, 1905 – January 12, 1909
- Governor: Robert Broadnax Glenn
- Preceded by: Cora Woodard Aycock
- Succeeded by: Musette Satterfield Kitchin

Personal details
- Born: Cornelia G. Deaderick; September 4, 1854 Jonesborough, Tennessee, U.S.
- Died: December 9, 1926 (aged 72) Winston-Salem, North Carolina, U.S.
- Resting place: Salem Cemetery
- Party: Democratic
- Spouse: Robert Broadnax Glenn
- Children: 3
- Parent(s): John Franklin Deaderick; Rebecca Lanier Williams
- Relatives: James W. Deaderick (uncle)

Cornelia Deaderick Glenn (September 4, 1854 – December 9, 1926) was an American society hostess and temperance activist who, as the wife of Robert Broadnax Glenn, served as First Lady of North Carolina from 1905 to 1909. She was involved in the temperance movement and avidly supported her husband's 1908 Prohibition campaign that banned liquor statewide. A devout Presbyterian, she was the founder of one of Winston-Salem's first benevolent societies.

== Early life and family ==
Nina Glenn was born Cornelia G. Deaderick on September 4, 1854, in Jonesborough, Tennessee. She was the youngest child of John Franklin Deaderick and Rebecca Lanier Williams Deaderick. Her family was prominent with strong political ties. Through her mother, Cornelia was descended from Colonel Joseph Williams, an officer in the Continental Army during the American Revolution and a delegate to the Hillsborough Convention.

Her paternal ancestors were planters and slaveholders who owned a 5,000-acre plantation located in the Orange Mound area in Memphis. Her paternal grandfather, David Deaderick, was a banker, businessman, and Revolutionary War veteran who arrived in Jonesborough in 1783 and later served in the Tennessee General Assembly. Her paternal uncle James W. Deaderick served in the Tennessee State Senate and as Chief Justice of the Tennessee Supreme Court. Her aunt Eliza Crozier Deaderick was the sister of Congressman John Hervey Crozier. Her first cousin, Adeline Deaderick, was married to Congressman John A. Moon.

== Marriage and public life ==
She married Robert Broadnax Glenn, a lawyer and a distant maternal cousin, on January 8, 1878, in Knoxville. Her husband was the son of her mother's niece, Annie (Dodge) Glenn and her husband. He grew up at Lower Sauratown Plantation in Rockingham County, North Carolina.

Cornelia and Robert Glenn had two sons, Chalmers Lanier Glenn and Frank Glenn, and a daughter, Rebekah Williams Glenn. The Glenns lived in Stokes County, North Carolina after getting married. The family later moved to Winston-Salem, where her husband became a prosecuting attorney for North Carolina's Ninth Judicial District. He later served as the United States Attorney for the Western District of North Carolina. He also served as a senator in the North Carolina State Senate.

After her husband was elected as Governor of North Carolina in 1905, they moved to Raleigh. There Glenn assumed the role of First Lady of the state. During her husband's inauguration festivities between January 6 and January 13, 1905, The Raleigh News & Observer reported that a large party of Winston-Salem citizens accompanied the Glenns to the capital city. The North Carolina Executive Mansion was under quarantine, as Louise Aycock, daughter of former governor Charles Brantley Aycock and former first lady Cora Lily Woodard Aycock, was recovering from diphtheria. The Glenns held their festivities elsewhere and could not move into the governor's residence until January 17, 1905. Glenn and her husband, one of her sons, her daughter, and her niece, Ann Dodge Glenn, resided in the mansion as North Carolina's first family.

Glenn was known to be an experienced entertainer and elegant hostess. She hosted lavish and well-planned parties, luncheons, and teas. As the official hostess, she entertained a number of dignitaries, including William Jennings Bryan and President William Howard Taft. She required the servants to serve all meals, including breakfast, formally on full silver place settings.

Glenn was known as a proper and strict housekeeper, and stern mother. She was passionate about music and gardening, and was active in the temperance movement. She firmly backed her husband's Prohibition campaign in 1908 that banned liquor statewide. Bootlegging and smuggling flourished.

== Later life and death ==
While living in Raleigh, she was a parishioner at First Presbyterian Church. Upon moving back to Winston-Salem after her husband's term was over, she attended that city's First Presbyterian Church and was active in the parish's missionary causes. Glenn founded one of the first benevolent societies in Winston-Salem. She died on December 9, 1926, aged 72, following a period of illness. She was buried in Salem Cemetery.

Honorary titles
Preceded by Cora Lily Woodard Aycock	First Lady of North Carolina; 1929–1933	Succeeded by Musette Satterfield Kitchin
