= Deaderick =

Deaderick is a surname. Notable people with the surname include:

- Brandon Deaderick (born 1987), American football player
- James W. Deaderick (1812–1890), American attorney
