= 1900 North Carolina gubernatorial election =

- August 2, 1900
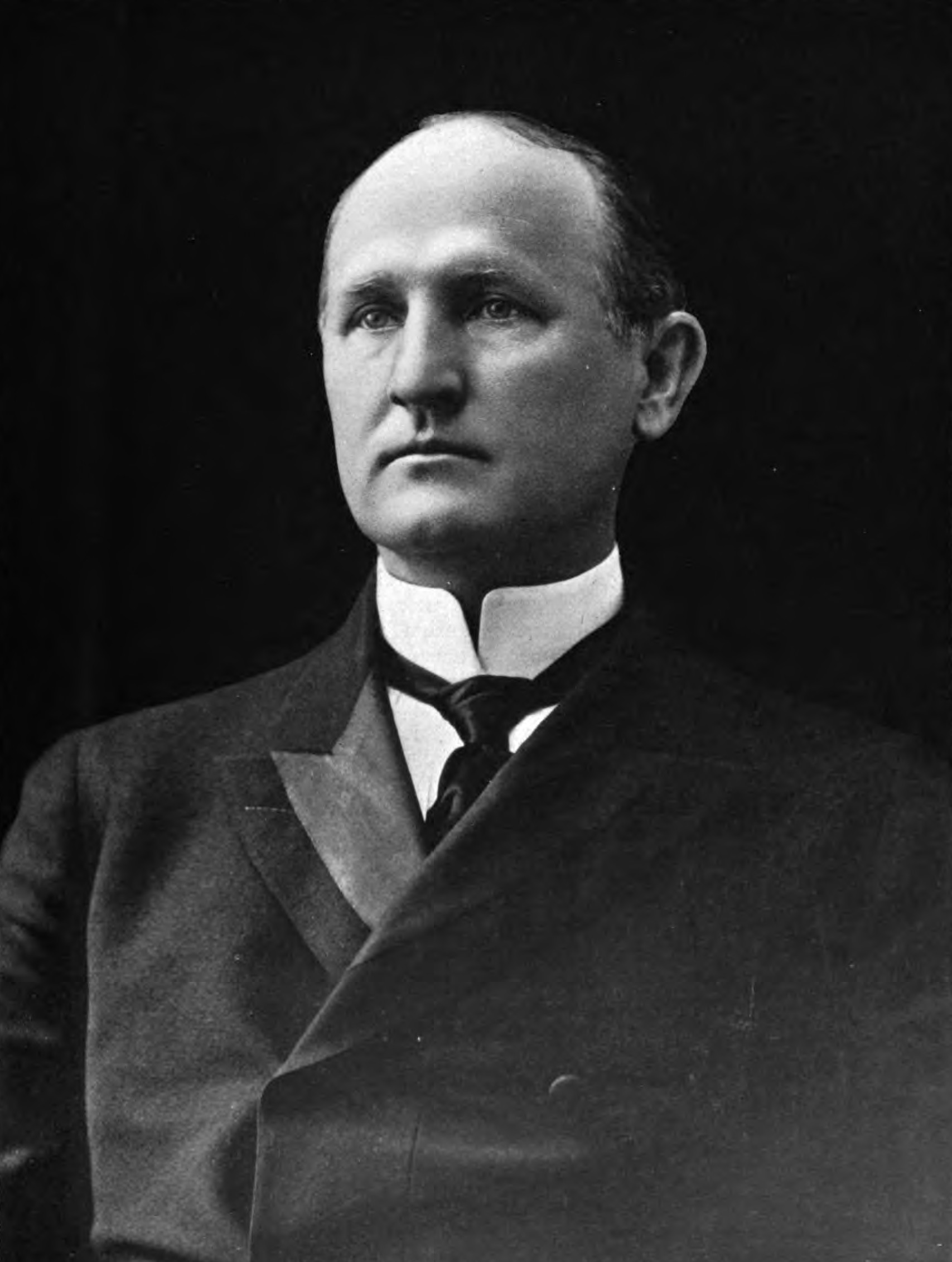

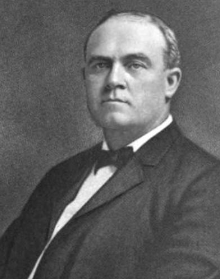
Nominee	Charles Brantley Aycock	Spencer B. Adams
Party	Democratic	Republican
Popular vote	186,650	126,296
Percentage	59.57%	40.31%
- County results Aycock: 50–60% 60–70% 70–80% 80–90% >90% Adams: 50–60% 60–70% 80–90%
Governor before election
Daniel Lindsay Russell
Republican
Elected Governor
Charles Brantley Aycock
Democratic

The 1900 North Carolina gubernatorial election was held on August 2, 1900. Democratic nominee Charles Brantley Aycock defeated Republican nominee Spencer B. Adams with 59.57% of the vote. The election started a string of 18 consecutive elections in which the Democratic nominee won the Governor's office. The state would not elect another Republican as governor until James E. Holshouser, Jr. won in 1972.

== General election ==
The backdrop of the election campaign was the backlash among whites to the relatively large role that African Americans had played in politics during the 1890s, as the coalition (or "Fusion") of Republicans and Populists took power. In 1898, the state Democratic Party won back the majority of seats in the legislature on a platform emphasizing "white supremacy." The resulting legislature then proposed an amendment to the North Carolina Constitution which added a literacy test and a poll tax requirement for voting, amounting to disfranchisement. The state's voters approved the constitutional amendment on the same day as the 1900 gubernatorial election.

Aycock, who had been a prominent spokesman for Democrats in the 1898 campaign, was unopposed for the Democratic Party nomination for Governor. During the campaign, Aycock emphasized not only white supremacy but also improving the public school system. The Republicans nominated Spencer Adams, an attorney and former North Carolina Superior Court judge.

The general election campaign featured a pro-Democratic paramilitary force known as Red Shirts. The party seemed to threaten violence, including a "willingness — in Aycock’s words — to 'rule by force'; only a vote for white supremacy and Black disenfranchisement would restore peace and good order."

=== Candidates ===
Major party candidates

- Charles Brantley Aycock, Democratic
- Spencer B. Adams, Republican

Other candidates

- Henry Sheets, Prohibition

=== Results ===
1900 North Carolina gubernatorial election
Party	Candidate	Votes	%	±%
Democratic	Charles Brantley Aycock	186,650	59.57%	
Republican	Spencer B. Adams	126,296	40.31%	
Prohibition	Henry Sheets	358	0.11%	
Majority		60,354		
Turnout				
Democratic gain from Republican		Swing		
