= Charles Keck =

American sculptor (1875–1951)

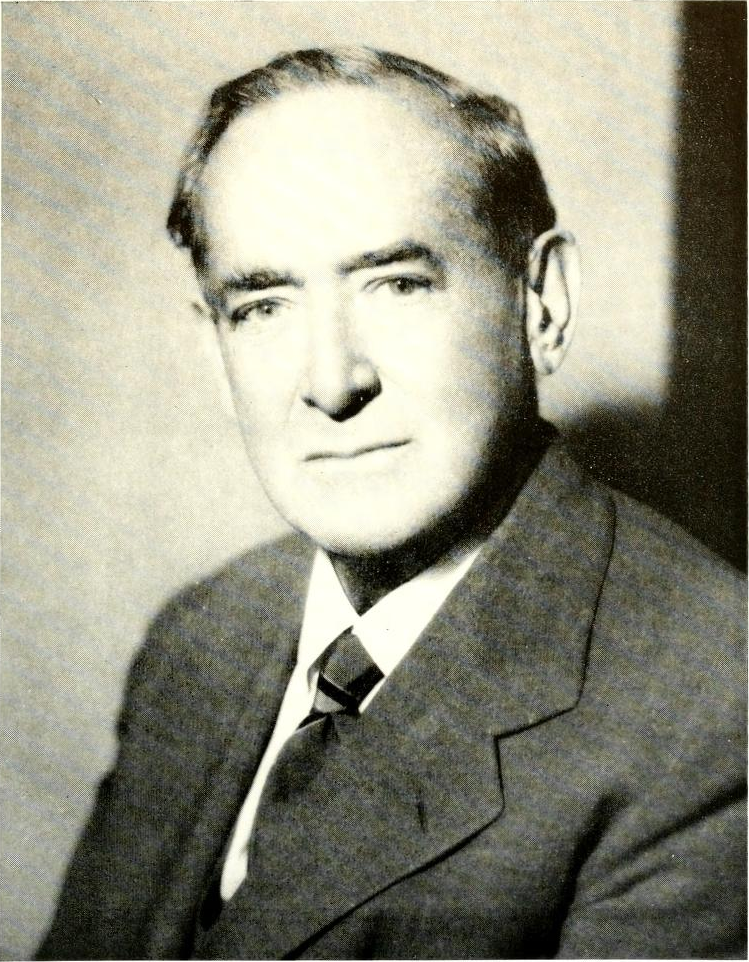
Keck, c. 1949

Charles Keck (September 9, 1875 – April 23, 1951) was an American sculptor from New York City, New York.

== Early life and education ==
Keck studied at the National Academy of Design and the Art Students League of New York with Philip Martiny, and was an assistant to Augustus Saint-Gaudens from 1893 to 1898. He also attended the American Academy in Rome. In 1921 he was elected into the National Academy of Design as an Associate member and became a full Academician in 1928. He is best known for his monuments and architectural sculpture. His work was also part of the sculpture event in the art competition at the 1932 Summer Olympics. His interment was located at Fishkill Rural cemetery.

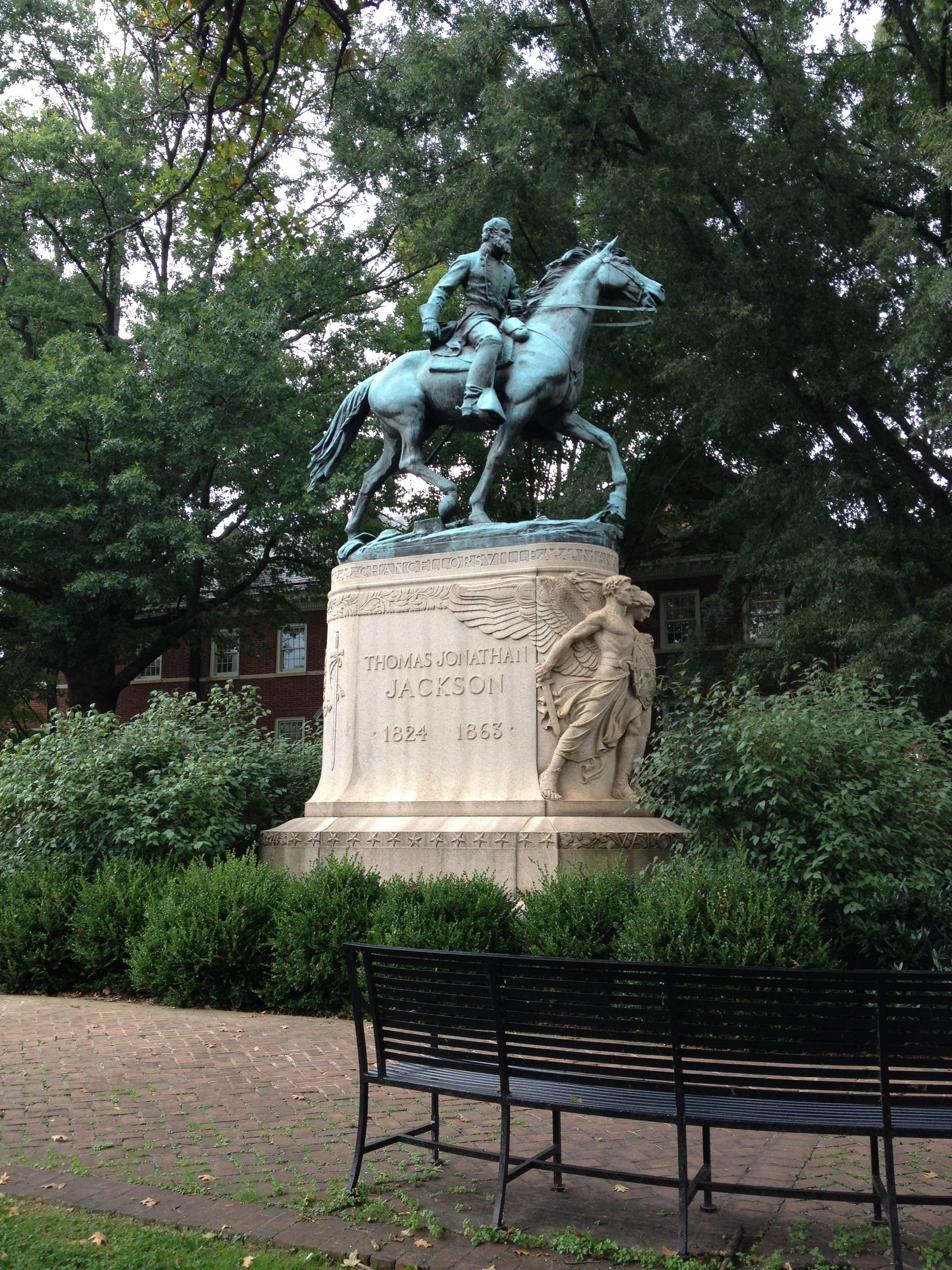
The Stonewall Jackson sculpture in downtown Charlottesville, Virginia in 2014. Statue was taken down and destroyed in 2021.

== Career ==
=== Architectural sculpture ===
- Brooklyn Museum, Genius of Islam, McKim, Mead and White, architects, New York City, 1908
- Pennsylvania Hall, University of Pittsburgh, Pittsburgh, Pennsylvania, 1908
- America at the Soldiers and Sailors National Military Museum and Memorial, Pittsburgh, 1910
- Oakland City Hall, Palmer & Hornbostel architects, Oakland, California, 1914
- Pittsburgh City-County Building, Palmer & Hornbostel architects, Pittsburgh, Pennsylvania, 1916
- Wilmington City Hall, Palmer & Hornbostel architects, Wilmington, Delaware, 1917
- Design of the doors of the John B. Murphy Memorial Building, Chicago, Illinois, 1926
- Education Building, Albany, New York
- Nelson Gallery of Art, Kansas City, Missouri
- Waldorf Astoria Hotel, Schultze & Weaver architects, New York City, 1931
- Essex County Building Annex, Newark, New Jersey, c. 1930
- Jackson County Court House, Wight & Wight, architects, Kansas City, Missouri, 1934
- Bronx County Courthouse, Freedlander & Hausle architects, Bronx, New York City, 1933
- Campus gates, Columbia University, New York City

=== Monuments and memorials ===
- Minot Monument, Goshen, New York, with architect Thomas Harlan Ellett, dedicated May, 1912
- Amicitia, Rio de Janeiro, Brazil
- George Washington, Buenos Aires, Argentina
- Statues of Christopher Gist and Guyasuta on the North Side Point Bridge, built in Pittsburgh, Pennsylvania, 1917
- Meriwether Lewis and William Clark, Charlottesville, Virginia, 1919
- Thomas Jonathan Jackson, Charlottesville, Virginia, 1921
- Duke Family sarcophagi, Memorial Chapel, Duke University, Durham, North Carolina
- 61st District War Memorial, (sculpture), Greenwood Playground, Ocean Parkway at Fort Hamilton Parkway Brooklyn, New York City, 1922
- John Mitchell, Scranton, Pennsylvania, 1924
- Liberty Monument, Ticonderoga, New York, 1924
- Lifting the Veil of Ignorance, statue of Booker T. Washington in Tuskegee, Alabama, 1927 (replica in Atlanta, Georgia)
- Angel of Peace, Exhibition Place, Toronto, 1930
- Patrick Henry, Hall of Fame for Great Americans, New York City, 1930
- The Lincoln Monument of Wabash, Indiana, 1932
- Statue of Charles Brantley Aycock, National Statuary Hall Collection, U.S. Capitol in Washington, D.C., 1935
- Father Francis P. Duffy, Duffy Square, New York City, 1937
- Huey Long Memorial, Baton Rouge, Louisiana, 1940
- Huey Long, National Statuary Hall Collection in the U.S. Capitol in Washington D.C., 1941
- Young Lincoln, Senn Park, Chicago, Illinois, 1945
- Andrew Jackson, Kansas City, Missouri
- Ernest Haass Memorial, Woodlawn Cemetery, Detroit, Michigan
- George Rogers Clark Memorial, Springfield, Ohio
- Listening Post, Lynchburg, Virginia
- Presidents North Carolina Gave the Nation, North Carolina State Capitol, Raleigh, North Carolina, 1948

In 1913 Keck designed a memorial plaque that was cast from metal that had been salvaged from the USS Maine after it was raised in Havana harbor the previous year. Over a thousand of the plaques were cast and they are spread unevenly all over the United States. In 1931, Keck completed the Great Seals of the Commonwealth of Virginia which had been commissioned by the Commonwealth. The obverse of the seal is still used and appears on the state flag.

=== Numismatic works ===
- 1915-S Panama-Pacific Exposition Gold Dollar
- 1927 Vermont, Battle of Bennington Sesquicentennial Half Dollar
- 1936 Lynchburg Sesquicentennial Half Dollar

== Other works ==
- Letters and Science, Columbia University, New York City, 1915 and 1925
