= Samuel Davis McReynolds =

American politician (1872–1939)

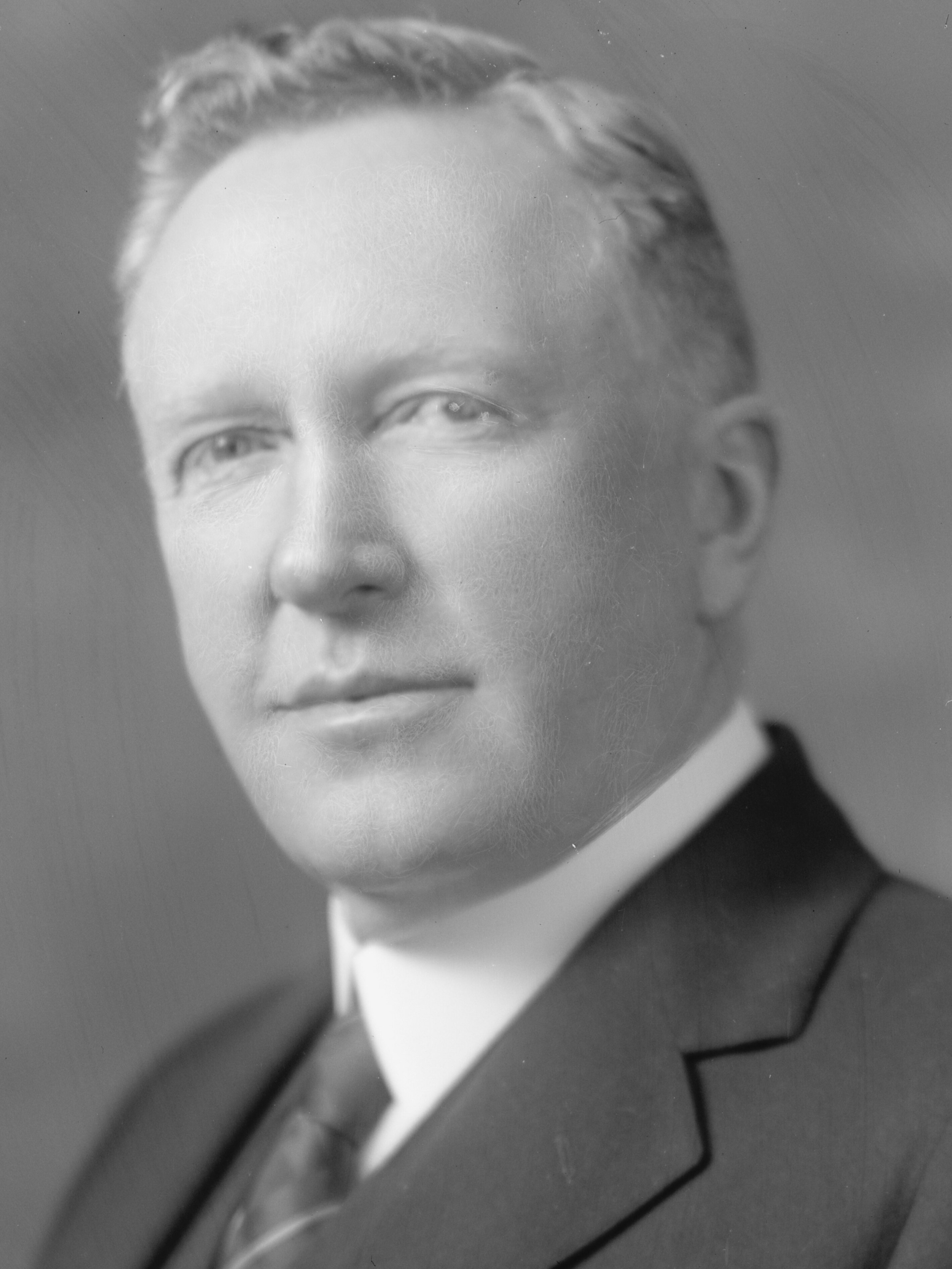

Member of the U.S. House of Representatives from Tennessee's 3rd district
- In office March 4, 1923 – July 11, 1939
- Preceded by: Joseph Edgar Brown
- Succeeded by: Estes Kefauver

Judge of the Criminal Court for the 6th Circuit of Tennessee
- In office April 16, 1903 – February 1, 1923

Personal details
- Born: April 16, 1872 Pikeville, Tennessee, U.S.
- Died: July 11, 1939 (aged 67) Washington, D.C., U.S.
- Party: Democratic
- Spouse(s): Jennie H McReynolds; Mary Davenport McReynolds
- Children: Margaret Hennrietta McReynolds
- Education: Cumberland University
- Profession: Attorney

Samuel Davis McReynolds (April 16, 1872 - July 11, 1939) was an American politician and judge who served as a member of the United States House of Representatives for the 3rd congressional district of Tennessee.

== Biography ==
Born on a farm near Pikeville, Tennessee, in Bledsoe County on April 16, 1872, McReynolds attended the rural schools, People's College at Pikeville, Tennessee, and Cumberland University at Lebanon, Tennessee. He studied law, was admitted to the bar in 1893, and commenced practice at Pikeville. He married Jennie Hutchins on December 21, 1905. After her death on April 16, 1908, he married Mary Davenport on March 9, 1910, and they had one daughter, Margaret Hennrietta.

== Career ==
In 1894 and 1896, McReynolds served as assistant district attorney of the sixth judicial circuit court of Tennessee. He moved to Chattanooga in 1896 and continued the practice of law. He was appointed judge of the criminal court for the sixth circuit of Tennessee on April 16, 1903. It was there that he heard the case State of Tennessee versus Ed Johnson, the case that later became United States v. Shipp. He was subsequently elected and twice re-elected to the same office. He served until February 1, 1923, when he resigned, having been elected to Congress.

McReynolds was elected as a Democrat to the Sixty-eighth and to the eight succeeding Congresses. During the Seventy-second through Seventy-sixth Congresses, he was the chairman of the House Committee on Foreign Affairs. He served in the House from March 4, 1923, until his death. In 1933, he was a delegate to the International Monetary and Economic Conference at London, England.

== Death ==
McReynolds died in Washington, D.C., on July 11, 1939. He was interred in Forest Hill Cemetery in Chattanooga, Tennessee.

== See also ==
- List of members of the United States Congress who died in office (1900–1949)

U.S. House of Representatives
Preceded by Joe Brown	U.S. Representative for Tennessee's 3rd congressional district 1923-1939	Succeeded by C. Estes Kefauver
