= Foster V. Brown =

American politician

Foster Vincent Brown
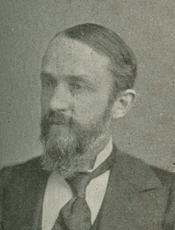

Member of the U.S. House of Representatives from Tennessee's 3rd district
- In office March 4, 1895 – March 3, 1897
- Preceded by: Henry C. Snodgrass
- Succeeded by: John A. Moon

Personal details
- Born: December 24, 1852 Sparta, Tennessee, U.S.
- Died: March 26, 1937 (aged 84) Chattanooga, Tennessee, U.S.
- Party: Republican Party
- Children: Joseph Edgar Brown
- Education: Burritt College (BA); Samford University (LLB)

Foster Vincent Brown (December 24, 1852 – March 26, 1937) was an American politician and attorney who served a U.S. Representative for Tennessee's 3rd congressional district.

== Early life and education ==
Born near Sparta, Tennessee, Brown was the son of Joseph and Martha Thankful Mitchell Brown, and attended the common schools. He graduated from Burritt College in Spencer, Tennessee, in 1871 and from the Cumberland School of Law in Lebanon, Tennessee, in 1873.

== Career ==
He was admitted to the bar and commenced practice in Jasper, Tennessee, in 1874.

Brown served as delegate to the Republican National Conventions in 1884, 1896, 1900, and 1916, and as attorney general of the fourth judicial district from 1886 to 1894. He moved to Chattanooga in May 1890 and continued the practice of law.

Elected as a Republican to the Fifty-fourth Congress representing Tennessee's 3rd congressional district Brown served from March 4, 1895, to March 3, 1897. He declined to be a candidate for renomination in 1896.

After leaving Congress Brown resumed the practice of law until he was appointed attorney general of Puerto Rico on May 10, 1910. He served in that position until April 20, 1912, when he resigned. He then resumed the practice of law in Chattanooga until his death.

== Personal life ==
Brown was the father of Joseph Edgar Brown.

Brown died on March 26, 1937, at the age of 84, in Chattanooga, Tennessee. He is interred at Forest Hills Cemetery.

U.S. House of Representatives
Preceded by Henry C. Snodgrass	Member of the U.S. House of Representatives from Tennessee's 3rd congressional district 1895–1897	Succeeded by John A. Moon
