= Henry C. Snodgrass =

American politician (1848–1931)

Henry Clay Snodgrass
- Congressman Snodgrass of Tennessee

Member of the U.S. House of Representatives from Tennessee's 3rd district
- In office March 4, 1891 – March 3, 1895
- Preceded by: Henry C. Evans
- Succeeded by: Foster V. Brown

Personal details
- Born: March 29, 1848
- Died: April 22, 1931 (aged 83)
- Citizenship: United States
- Party: Democratic
- Spouse: Ammie R. Cope Snodgrass
- Children: Linnie Clay Snodgrass Black
- Education: Cumberland University
- Profession: Attorney; politician; judge; farmer

Military service
- Allegiance: Confederate States of America
- Branch/service: Confederate States Army
- Rank: Private
- Battles/wars: American Civil War

Henry Clay Snodgrass (March 29, 1848 – April 22, 1931) was an American politician and a member of the United States House of Representatives for the 3rd congressional district of Tennessee.

== Biography ==
Snodgrass was born on March 29, 1848, near Sparta, Tennessee, in White County. He attended Sparta Academy, studied law at Cumberland University in Lebanon, Tennessee, and was admitted to the bar in 1870. He commenced practice in Sparta, Tennessee and engaged in agricultural pursuits.

== Career ==
During the Civil War, Snodgrass served as a private in the Confederate Army. From 1878 to 1884, he was the attorney general of the fifth judicial circuit.

Snodgrass was elected as a Democrat to the 52nd and 53rd Congresses. He served from March 4, 1891, to March 3, 1895, but he was not a successful candidate for re-election to the 54th Congress. He was a delegate to the Democratic National Convention in 1896. He resumed the practice of his profession in Sparta, Tennessee in White County.

Snodgrass moved to Gould, Oklahoma, and engaged in agricultural pursuits.

== Death ==
Snodgrass died on April 22, 1931 (age 83 years, 24 days) in Altus, Oklahoma. He is interred at Altus Cemetery. He was the uncle of fellow Tennessee congressman Charles Edward Snodgrass.

U.S. House of Representatives
| Preceded by Henry C. Evans | Member of the U.S. House of Representatives from Tennessee's 3rd congressional district 1891–1895 | Succeeded by Foster V. Brown |
