= Letters and Science =

Pair of sculptures by Charles Keck in Manhattan, New York, U.S.

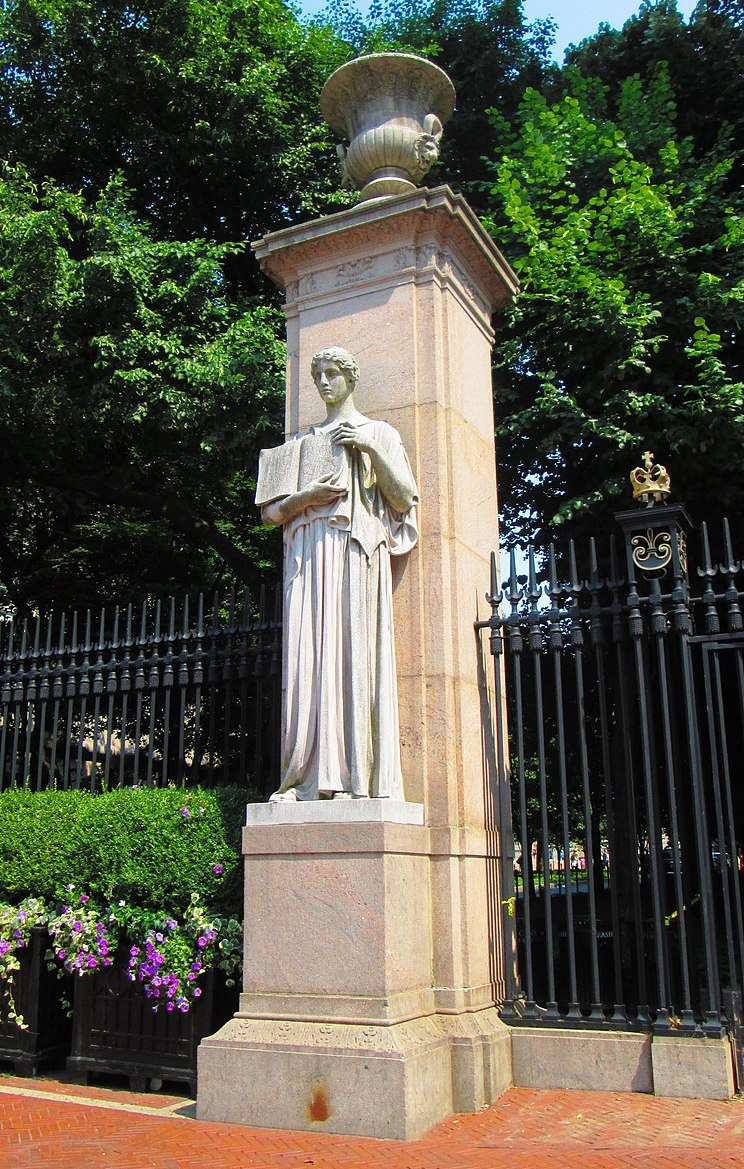
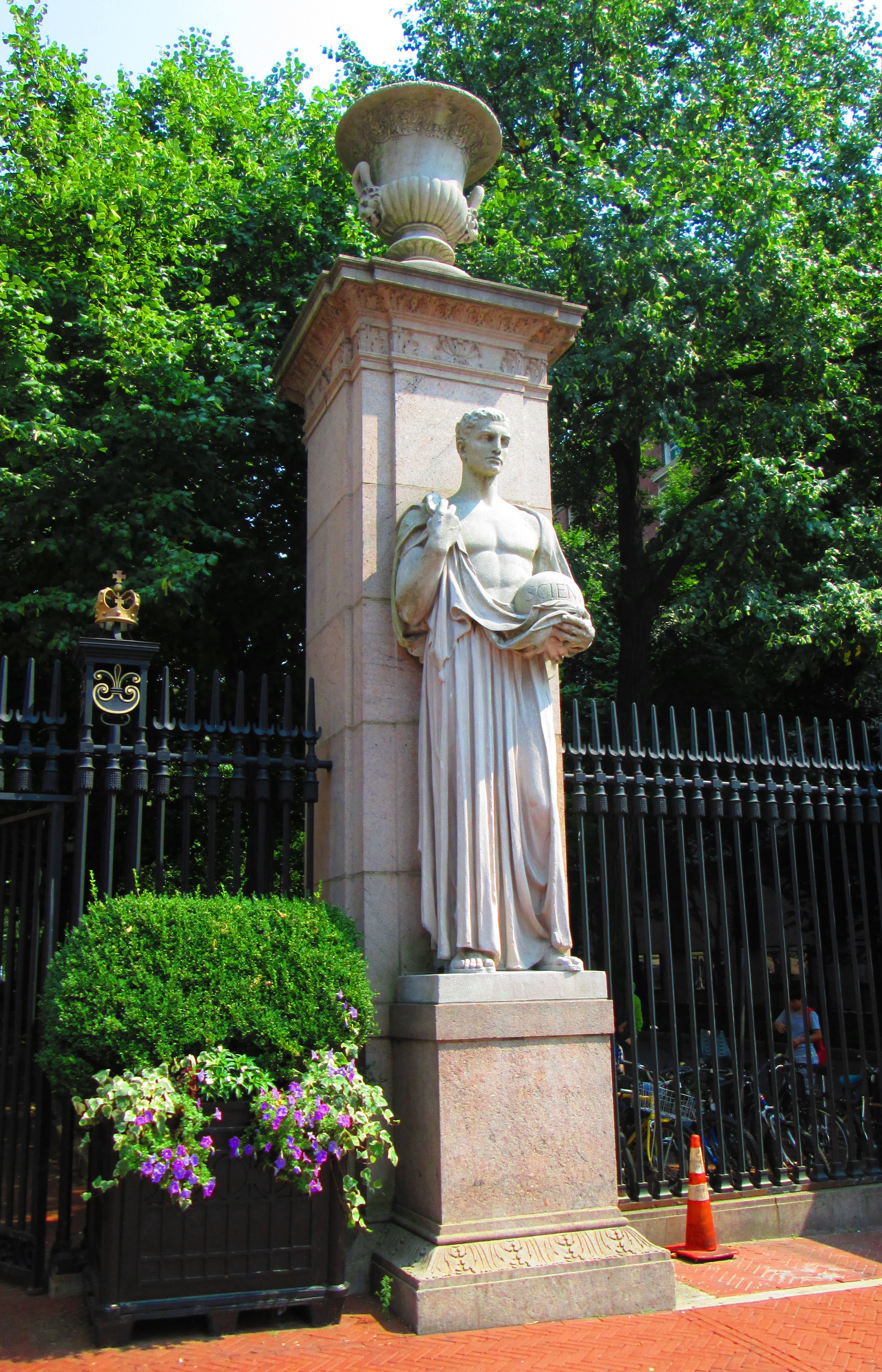
- Letters, 2014 Science, 2014
- Artist: Charles Keck
- Year: 1915-25
- Medium: Granite
- Subject: A woman and a man
- Location: Columbia University; New York City; 40.80818°N 73.96378°W

Letters and Science are granite sculptures created by Charles Keck, installed at Columbia University's main entrance, at the intersection of Broadway and 116th Street, in New York City. They were created in 1915 and 1925, respectively. Letters depicts a woman holding a book across her chest; Science depicts a male figure holding a compass and globe.

== See also ==
- 1915 in art
- 1925 in art
