= Statue of Huey Long =

Statue in the U.S. Capitol

Huey Long
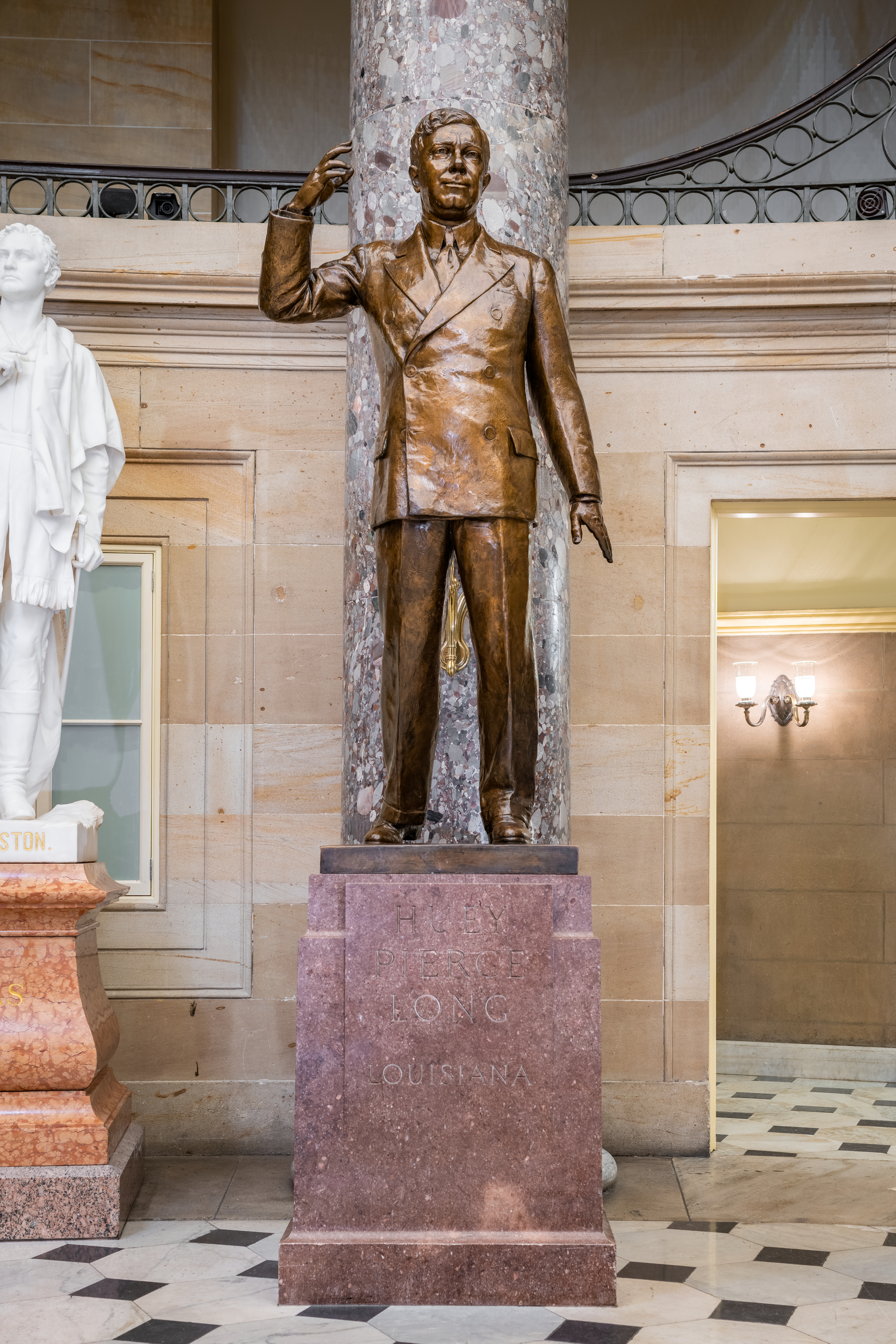
- The statue at the National Statuary Hall in 2023
- Artist: Charles Keck
- Medium: Bronze sculpture
- Subject: Huey Long
- Location: Washington, D.C., U.S.

Huey Long is a 1941 bronze sculpture of Huey Long by Charles Keck, installed in the United States Capitol, in Washington, D.C., as part of the National Statuary Hall Collection. It is one of two statues donated by the state of Louisiana.

The statue was accepted in the collection by Senator Allen Ellender on April 25, 1941. At that time Ellender said, “He was a doer of things for the benefit of the masses; and his philosophy of distribution of wealth, his advocacy of pensions for the aged, shorter work hours for labor and his continued fight for the masses ….. marked him for death.”

Long, a popular populist nicknamed “The Kingfish”, was first Governor and then Senator from Louisiana and was assassinated in Baton Rouge on September 8, 1935.

Another statue of Long by Keck was unveiled in 1940 on the grounds of the Louisiana State Capitol in Baton Rouge.

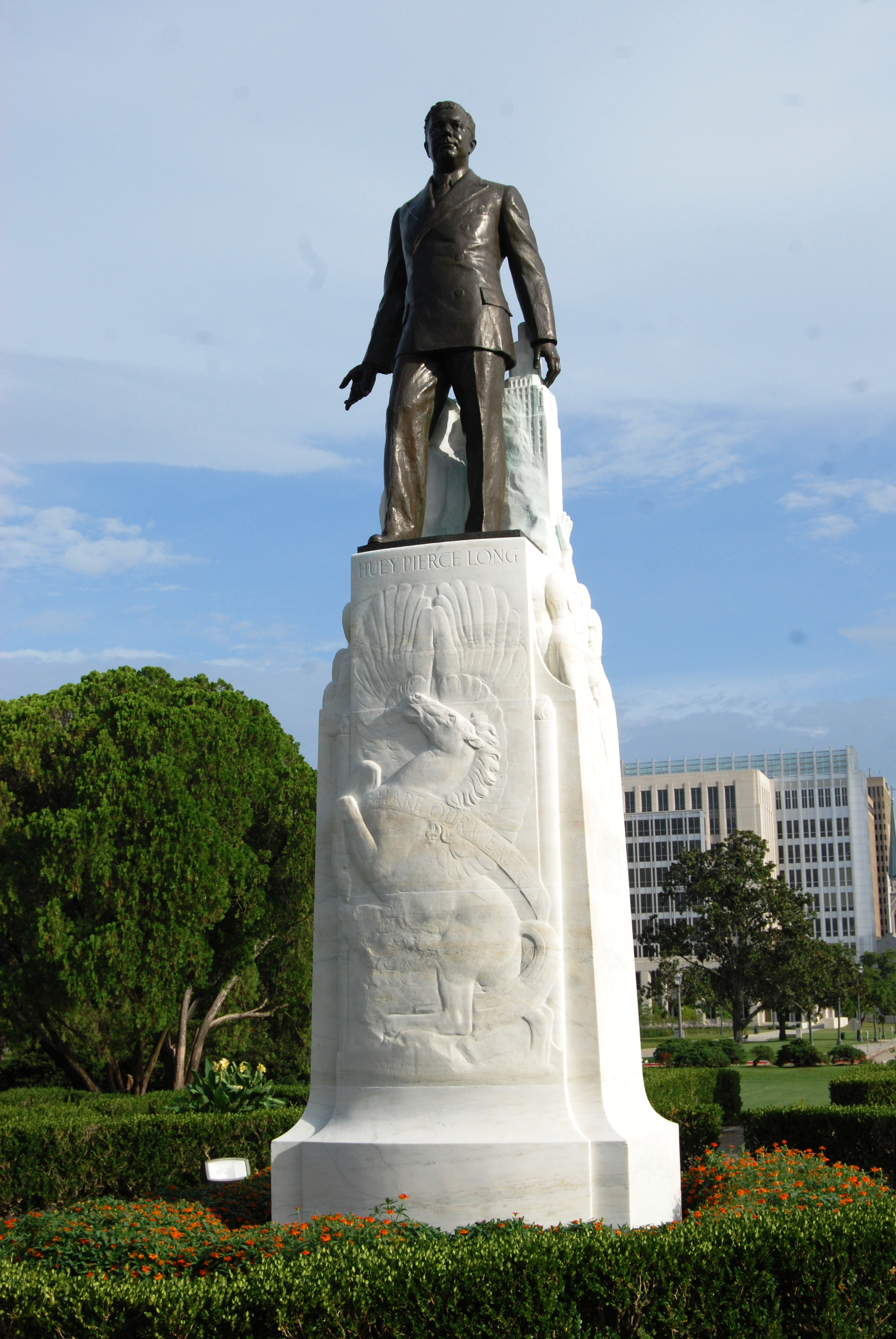
Keck's statue of Long in Baton Rouge, Louisiana

== See also ==
- 1941 in art
