= Statue of Charles Brantley Aycock =

Statue by Charles Keck

Charles Brantley Aycock
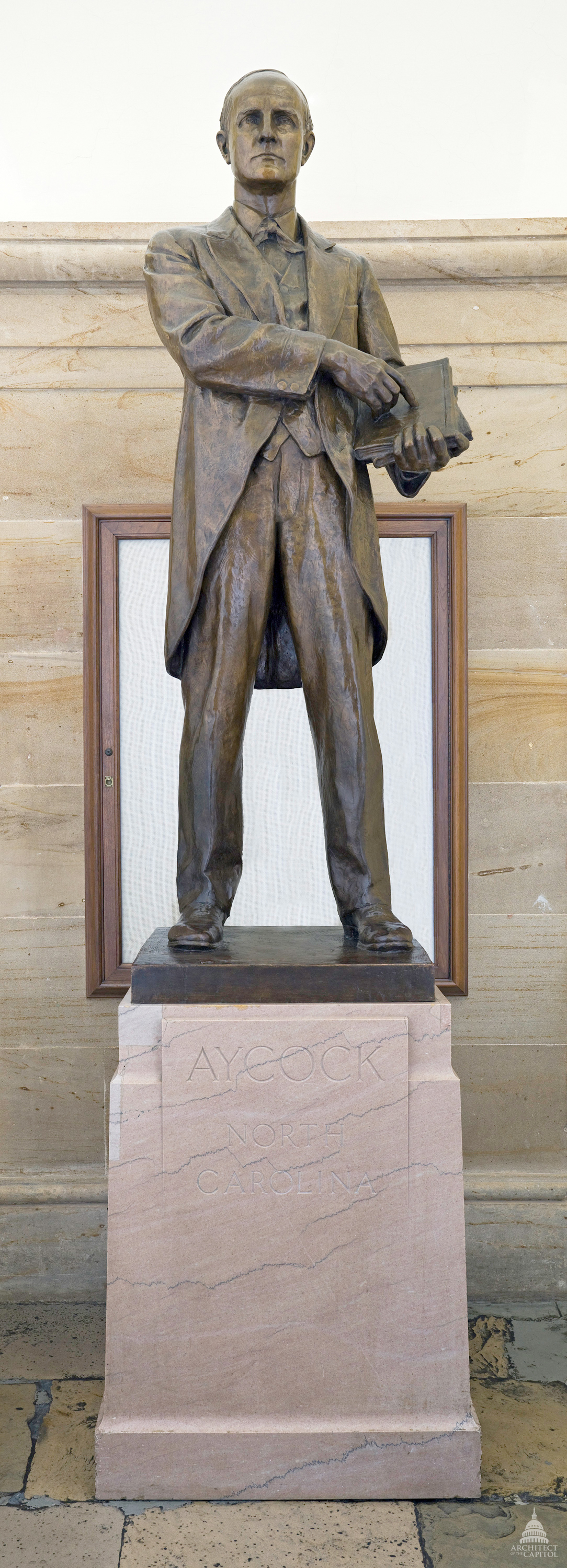
- The statue in the National Statuary Hall Collection
- Artist: Charles Keck
- Medium: Bronze sculpture
- Subject: Charles Brantley Aycock
- Location: unknown

Charles Brantley Aycock is a bronze sculpture depicting the American politician of the same name by Charles Keck, installed in the United States Capitol's crypt as part of the National Statuary Hall Collection. The statue was gifted by the U.S. state of North Carolina in 1932.

On February 28, 2018, the governor of North Carolina requested from the Architect of the Capitol replacement of the statue with one of evangelist Billy Graham, pursuant to legislation signed in 2015. The statue of Graham was unveiled in May 2024, replacing Aycock's statue.

== See also ==
- 1932 in art
