= Clarence Hamilton Poe =

American editor and farmer (1881–1964)

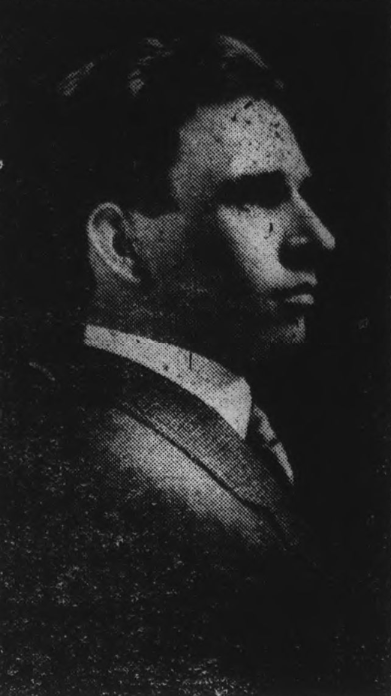
- Born: January 10, 1881; Chatham County, North Carolina
- Died: October 8, 1964 (aged 83)
- Occupation: Journalist
- Spouse: Alice Varina Aycock
- Parent(s): William Baxter; Susan Dismukes Poe
- Relatives: Augustine Henry Shepperd

Clarence Poe (1881–1964) was an American Progressive Era Southern editor, author, and reformer.

== Biography ==
=== Early life ===
Clarence Hamilton Poe was born on January 10, 1881, near Gulf in Chatham County, North Carolina. His father, William Baxter (1839–1907), was a small cotton farmer and his mother was Susan Dismukes Poe (1846-1911). Augustine Henry Shepperd (1792–1864) was one of his maternal ancestors. He attended Rocky Branch School and only one year of high school.

=== Career ===
He served as editor of The Progressive Farmer for 65 years beginning in 1899.

He was prominent in pushing for reforms in Southern agriculture to make it more scientific and to improve rural conditions in the South. He served on the State of North Carolina Board of Agriculture, the advisory council of the United States Department of Agriculture, and on the National Commission on Farm Tenancy, as well as chairing the North Carolina Hospital and Medical Care Commission appointed by Governor Broughton in 1944. Poe was praised by many in North Carolina and the South for the work he did for agriculture.

He worked with his wife's stepmother and aunt, Cora Lily Woodard Aycock, to publish The Life and Speeches of Charles B. Aycock in 1912.

He also served on the board of trustees of the North Carolina State College. A building at the university, Poe Hall, was named in his honor.

== Personal life ==
Poe married Alice Varina Aycock, the daughter of Governor Charles B. Aycock and his first wife, Varina Woodard..

=== Death ===
He died on October 8, 1964.

== Bibliography ==
- Cotton: Its Cultivation, Marketing and Manufacture (with C. W. Burkett, 1906)
- A Southerner in Europe (1908)
- Where Half the World Is Waking Up (1912)
- Life and Speeches of Charles B. Aycock (with R. D. W. Connor, 1912)
- How Farmers Cooperate and Double Profits (1915)
- True Tales of the South at War (1961)
- My First Eighty Years (1963)
