= James W. Deaderick =

American judge

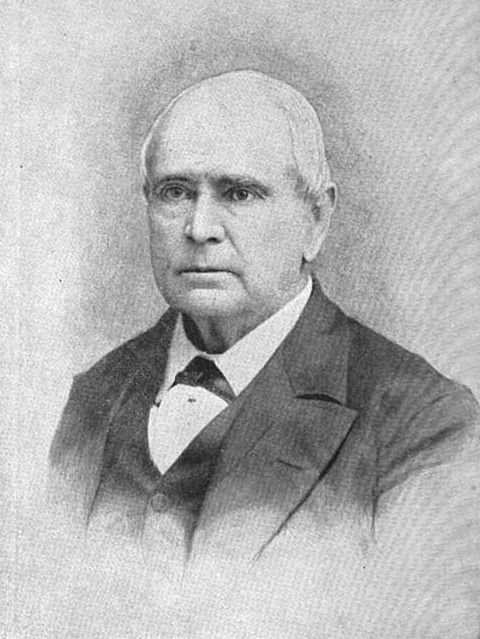

Chief Justice of the Tennessee Supreme Court
- In office 1876–1886
- Preceded by: A.O.P. Nicholson
- Succeeded by: Peter Turney

Member of the Tennessee Senate for Washington, Sullivan, Carter and Johnson
- In office October 6, 1851 – October 2, 1853
- Preceded by: Abraham Tipton
- Succeeded by: Godfrey C. Nave

Personal details
- Born: November 25, 1812 Jonesborough, Tennessee, U.S.
- Died: October 8, 1890 (aged 77) Jonesborough, Tennessee
- Resting place: Jonesborough City Cemetery; Jonesborough, Tennessee
- Party: Whig; Constitutional Union; Democratic
- Spouse: Adeline McDowell (m. 1832)
- Relations: Joseph Anderson (uncle); Ephraim McDowell (father-in-law); Alexander O. Anderson (cousin); John Austin Moon (son-in-law); Cornelia Deaderick Glenn (niece)
- Children: 10
- Education: East Tennessee College; Centre College
- Profession: Attorney

James William Deaderick (November 25, 1812 – October 8, 1890) was an American attorney who served as chief justice of the Tennessee Supreme Court from 1876 to 1886. Prior to becoming Chief Justice, he was an associate justice of the court, having been elected to the bench in 1870 after the enaction of the new state constitution. He had previously served one term in the Tennessee Senate (1851–1853), and campaigned as an elector for presidential candidate John Bell in 1860.

== Early life ==
Deaderick was born in Jonesborough, Tennessee, the youngest son of David Deaderick and Margaret (Anderson) Deaderick. His father was a Revolutionary War veteran who had arrived in Jonesborough in 1783, and was working as president of the local Bank of Tennessee branch when James was born. James attended East Tennessee College in Knoxville, Tennessee, and Centre College in Danville, Kentucky, but did not graduate from either.

Deaderick and his wife, Adeline, moved to Cheek's Crossroads in Jefferson County, Tennessee (now part of Hamblen County) in 1833. He established a farm and opened a general store. Due in part to the Panic of 1837, his business had failed by the end of the decade. In 1841, he was appointed by President John Tyler agent to the Potawatomi tribe in Iowa. He served in this post for just a few months, however.

Upon returning to Jonesborough, Deaderick studied law under Judge Seth J.W. Lucky, a local abolitionist. At one point early in his studies, he considered quitting, but continued after receiving encouragement from rising young attorney T.A.R. Nelson. He was admitted to the bar in 1844. When he showed up for his examination, Judge Lucky told him, "you need no examination." He would practice law in Jonesborough until the Civil War.

In 1851, Deaderick, an "ardent Henry Clay Whig," was elected to the Tennessee Senate seat for the district consisting of Washington, Carter, Sullivan, and Johnson counties. As chairman of the senate's Internal Improvement committee, he vigorously supported state funding for railroad construction. He served only one term. Deaderick ran for judge of Tennessee's first judicial circuit in 1854, but was defeated by David T. Patterson, 3,173 votes to 1,986. He was an unsuccessful candidate for state attorney general in 1859.

During the sectional crisis of the late 1850s, Deaderick opposed secession. In the 1860 presidential race, he campaigned as an elector for Constitutional Union candidate John Bell, who opposed both secession and the abolition of slavery. Deaderick was a successful candidate on the Union ticket for the proposed state secession convention in February 1861, though voters rejected holding the convention. Deaderick was a member of the Washington County delegation at the Greeneville session of the pro-Union East Tennessee Convention in June 1861. As Washington County's representative on the convention's business committee, he opposed a series of confrontational resolutions proposed by T.A.R. Nelson, who was president of the convention, and instead supported a more moderate set of resolutions proposed by Knoxville attorney Oliver Perry Temple.

As secession became a reality in Tennessee, Deaderick agreed to support the Confederacy. He kept a low profile during the war, though six of his sons fought for the Confederacy. In April 1866, after the war had ended, Deaderick was forced to flee to Bristol after receiving threats from a local Union League. He moved to Knoxville shortly afterward to practice law.

== Tennessee Supreme Court ==
While the enaction of the 1870 state constitution restored former Confederates' right to vote, Conservatives— a faction of moderate former Unionists and Confederate sympathizers— were concerned that Radicals would use the Fourteenth Amendment (which barred Confederate politicians from holding office) to negate any Conservative election victories. Candidates in the August 1870 judicial elections were thus selected by Conservatives for their ability to survive Fourteenth Amendment challenges. The Conservative ticket, which consisted of Deaderick and T.A.R. Nelson for East Tennessee, Peter Turney and Alfred O. P. Nicholson from Middle Tennessee, and John L.T. Sneed and Thomas J. Freeman from West Tennessee, swept the elections.

Following the death of Nicholson in 1876, Deaderick was elevated to chief justice. He ran for reelection in 1878, this time as a candidate for one of the state's two at-large seats on the bench. While he ran on the Democratic ticket, he consistently stated his only goal was the interpretation of the law, not promoting one political view over another. He was easily reelected.

Deaderick's opinions were relatively short, and generally did not cite authority. He frequently relied on his sense of justice rather than what written laws demanded. The court dealt with a wide range of issues during his tenure, including the state debt, legal issues arising from the war, family and moral issues, and issues regarding race and equality.

Arguably the biggest case of Deaderick's tenure was Lynn v. Polk (1882), which arose from a long-standing debate over how to handle the state's out-of-control debt. Republicans wanted to pay the debt in full, while Democrats were divided over the issue, with one faction arguing for a partial payment, and another arguing for full payment. With Democrats split, a Republican, Alvin Hawkins, was elected governor, and a law providing for full payment of the debt was passed. Supporters of the partial payment sued to block the law. In Lynn v. Polk, the state supreme court ruled 3-2 that the law violated the state constitution by hampering the legislature's ability to budget effectively. Deaderick was one of the two dissenters.

== Later life and family ==
At the end of his second term in 1886, Deaderick retired to his home in Jonesborough. He died in 1890, and was interred in the Jonesborough City Cemetery.

Deaderick and his wife, Adeline, had ten children: Arthur, Shelby, Anna, James, Frank, Wallace, Alfred, Louis, Charles, and Adeline. Deaderick's uncle, Joseph Anderson, was one of Tennessee's inaugural U.S. senators in 1796. Deaderick's wife, Adeline, was a daughter of famed Kentucky physician Ephraim McDowell, and a granddaughter of Isaac Shelby. Deaderick Street in Nashville was named for Deaderick's older brother, Michael, who worked as a banker in the city in the early 1800s. Another brother, David, was married to Eliza Crozier, the sister of Congressman John Hervey Crozier. Deaderick's daughter, Adeline, was married to Tennessee Congressman John A. Moon. His niece, Cornelia Deaderick Glenn, was married to North Carolina governor Robert Broadnax Glenn.
