= Joe Brown (politician) =

American politician

Joseph Edgar Brown
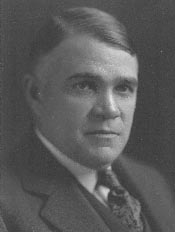

Member of the U.S. House of Representatives from Tennessee's 3rd district
- In office March 4, 1921 – March 4, 1923
- Preceded by: John A. Moon
- Succeeded by: Sam D. McReynolds

Personal details
- Born: February 11, 1880 Jasper, Tennessee, U.S.
- Died: June 13, 1939 (aged 59) Chattanooga, Tennessee, U.S.
- Party: Republican Party
- Spouse: Hester Jefferson McClain Brown
- Education: Cumberland University; Cumberland School of Law
- Occupation: lawyer politician

Joseph Edgar Brown (February 11, 1880 – June 13, 1939) was a U.S. representative from Tennessee. He was the son of Foster Vincent Brown and Lula (Farrior) Brown.

== Biography ==
Born in Jasper, Tennessee, Brown attended Baylor School in Chattanooga, and graduated from Cumberland University, Lebanon, Tennessee, in 1902 where he studied law at Cumberland School of Law. He was admitted to the Tennessee bar in 1904 and commenced practice in Jasper. He moved to Chattanooga in 1907 and continued the practice of law. He married Hester Jefferson McClain.

== Career ==
Brown was elected as a Republican to the Sixty-seventh Congress (March 4, 1921 – March 3, 1923), representing Tennessee's 3rd district. He was not a candidate for renomination in 1922.

After leaving Congress, Brown served as chairman of the Republican State executive committee from 1922 to 1924 and resumed the practice of law in Chattanooga. He served as delegate to the Republican National Convention in 1924.

== Death ==
Brown died in Charleston on June 13, 1939, (age 59 years, 122 days) and is interred in Forest Hills Cemetery.

U.S. House of Representatives
Preceded by John A. Moon	Member of the U.S. House of Representatives from Tennessee's 3rd congressional district March 4, 1921 – March 4, 1923	Succeeded by Sam D. McReynolds
