= Cora Lily Woodard Aycock =

First Lady of North Carolina

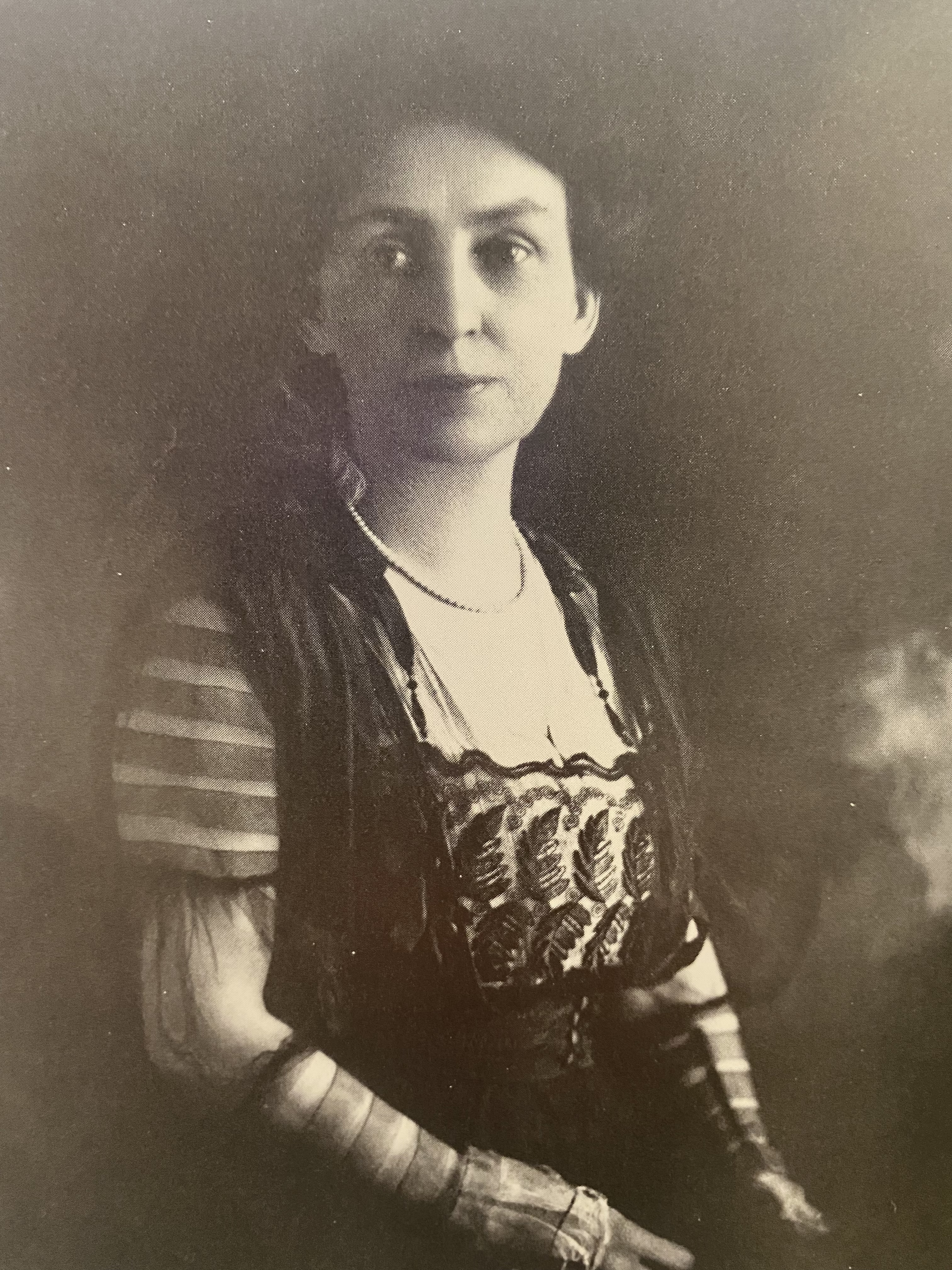

President of the North Carolina Railroad
- In role 1933–1937
- Governor: John C. B. Ehringhaus
- Preceded by: Fanny Yarborough Bickett

First Lady of North Carolina
- In role January 15, 1901 – January 11, 1905
- Governor: Charles Brantley Aycock
- Preceded by: Sarah Amanda Sanders Russell
- Succeeded by: Cornelia Deaderick Glenn

Personal details
- Born: Cora Lily Woodard; October 11, 1868 Wilson, North Carolina, U.S.
- Died: March 13, 1952 (aged 83)
- Resting place: Historic Oakwood Cemetery
- Party: Democratic
- Spouse: Charles Brantley Aycock
- Children: 7
- Parent(s): William Woodard; Delphia Rountree
- Relatives: Lucile Aycock McKee (granddaughter)
- Education: Wilson Collegiate Institute; Mary Baldwin College
- Occupation: farmer, political hostess, railway executive

Cora Lily Woodard Aycock (October 11, 1868 – March 13, 1952) was an American political hostess, farmer, and railway executive. As the second wife of Governor Charles Brantley Aycock, she served as First Lady of North Carolina from 1901 to 1905. While her husband was an outspoken white supremacist and segregationist, she was known to be rather apolitical but staunchly supported her husband's educational reforms for public schools. Aycock spent her time as first lady entertaining guests at small gatherings at the North Carolina Executive Mansion, raising her seven children and two surviving stepchildren, and instructing her children in music. Aycock was the first North Carolinian first lady to give birth at the executive mansion.

After her husband's death in 1912 left her without much of an estate, Aycock made a modest income by selling tobacco from her farm in Wilson County and selling extra milk and produce from her 1-acre lot in Raleigh. She worked with her son-in-law, the writer Clarence Hamilton Poe, to publish The Life and Speeches of Charles B. Aycock. In the 1930s, she was appointed as the President of the North Carolina Railroad by Governor John C. B. Ehringhaus.

== Early life and education ==
Aycock was born Cora Lily Woodard on October 11, 1868, in Wilson, North Carolina to Elder William Woodard, a Primitive Baptist lay preacher and farmer, and Delphia Rountree Woodard. She was educated at the Wilson Collegiate Institute and attended Mary Baldwin College in Staunton, Virginia.

== Public life ==
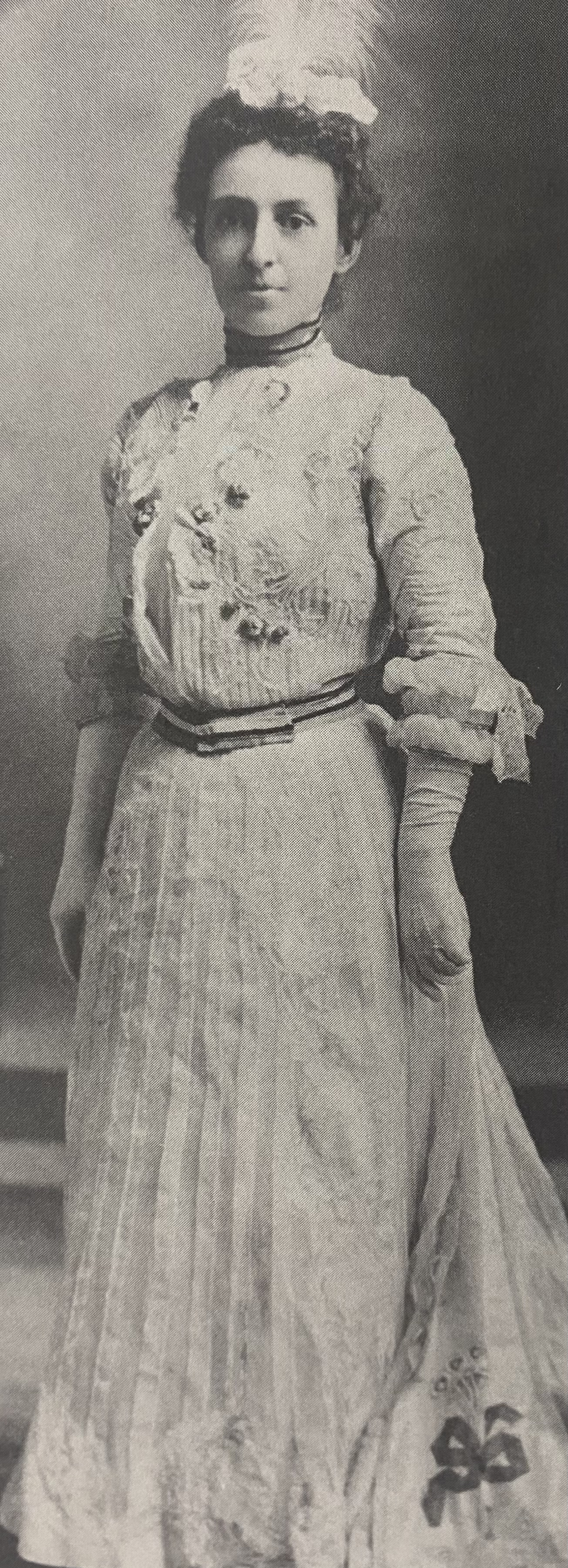
First Lady Aycock in her inaugural ballgown in 1901.

Aycock became First Lady of North Carolina upon her husband's election as governor. She was dressed in a lavish gown from the House of Worth in Paris for the inauguration ball. Upon moving into the North Carolina Executive Mansion in 1901, Aycock found that the governor's annual salary of $3,000 was not enough to cover the elaborate entertaining expected from a first lady. She spent her time at the mansion cutting costs and budgeting for social events. Instead of extravagant dinners and balls, Aycock hosted small dinners for friends and colleagues. She refused to undertake many large events at the mansion for lack of funding. Aycock maintained a low profile while acting as first lady, and focused much of her attention toward raising her children and stepchildren and keeping house at the mansion.

She was an accomplished musician and instructed her children in piano, as well as playing at the house for guests. While her husband was a vocal Democrat and outspoken white supremacist and segregationist, she was known to be rather apolitical. Despite her lack of interest in politics, she encouraged her husband's interest in education and supported his reforms for public schools.

In the 1930s, Aycock was appointed as president of the North Carolina Railroad Company by Governor John C. B. Ehringhaus.

== Personal life ==
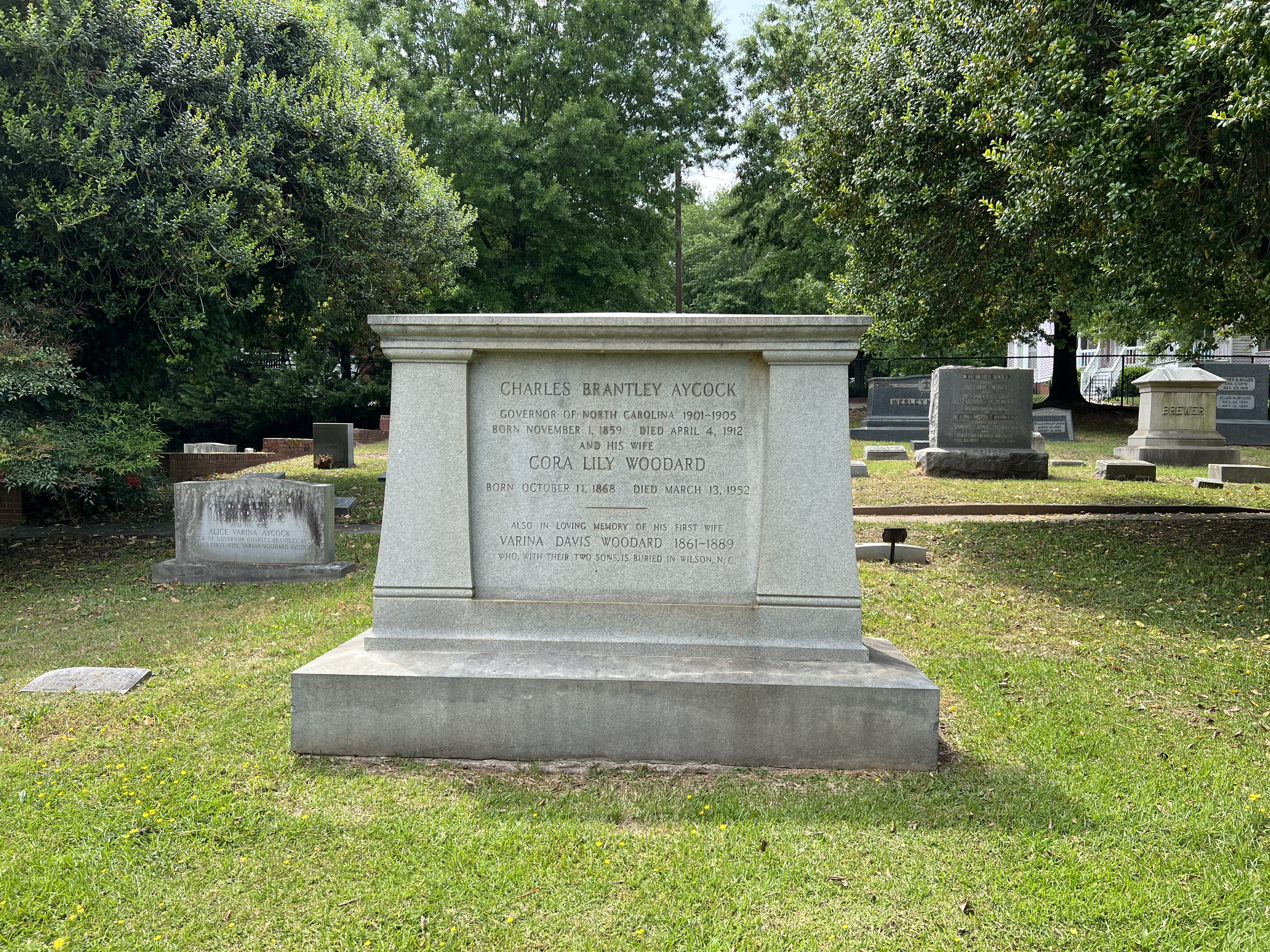
The Aycock tomb in Historic Oakwood Cemetery

Cora Lily Woodard married Charles Brantley Aycock, an attorney, on January 7, 1891. She was his second wife, as he was previously married for eight years to her older sister, Varina Woodard, until her death on July 9, 1889. She became the stepmother of her sister's three children, Ernest Aycock, Charles Brantley Aycock Jr., and Alice Varina Aycock. Cora and Charles later had their own children together: William Benjamin Aycock, Mary Lily Aycock, Connor Woodard Aycock, John Lee Aycock, Louise Rountree Aycock, Frank Daniels Aycock, and Brantley "Charles" Aycock. Her son, Frank, was the first child to be born in the executive mansion.

The Aycock family was of modest means and they left public office in debt, largely in part because of personal expenses associated with being the state's first family. After her husband's term as governor ended, they moved to Goldsboro, where they had lived prior to moving into the executive mansion in Raleigh. In 1910, they moved back to Raleigh. Her husband died in 1912, leaving her without much of an estate. Aycock kept chickens, a cow, and grew vegetables on her 1-acre property in Raleigh, and sold extra milk and produce to make a profit. She inherited a farm in Wilson County from her parents, adjacent to her brother-in-law's farm. She received a modest income by selling tobacco from the farm, and also was provided ham and sausage from raising pigs. With the help of her son-in-law, Clarence Hamilton Poe, she published and sold The Life and Speeches of Charles B. Aycock.

Aycock, who was Primitive Baptist, remained an active member of her church in Wilson throughout her life.

She died on March 13, 1952 in Raleigh, North Carolina. Her funeral, held at her daughter's house in Lakewood Gardens, was officiated by a minister from Pullen Memorial Baptist Church. Aycock was buried beside her husband in Historic Oakwood Cemetery.

Honorary titles
Preceded by Sarah Amanda Sanders Russell	First Lady of North Carolina; 1929–1933	Succeeded by Cornelia Deaderick Glenn
