= Robert Broadnax Glenn =

American politician

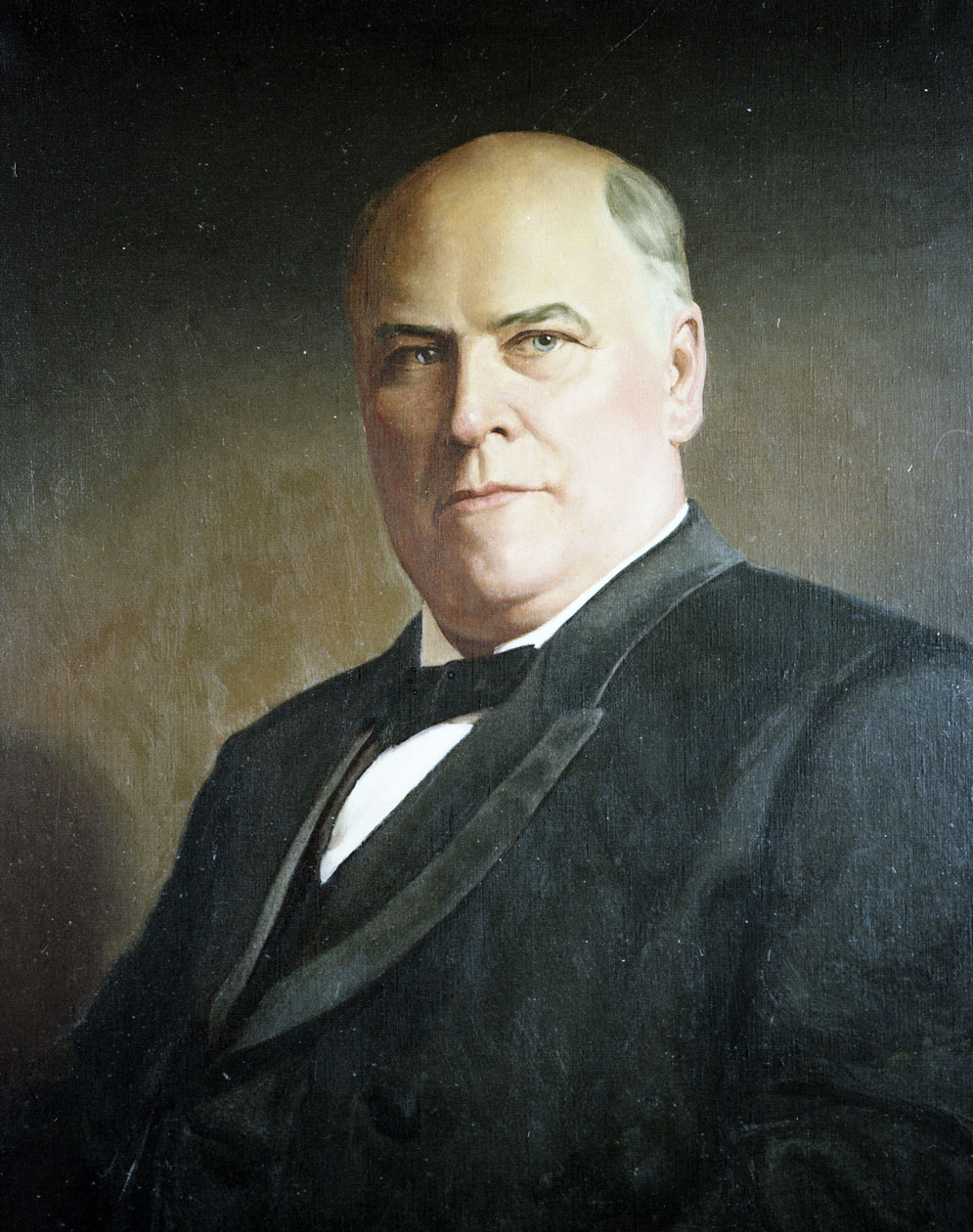

51st Governor of North Carolina
- In office January 11, 1905 – January 12, 1909
- Lieutenant: Francis D. Winston
- Preceded by: Charles Brantley Aycock
- Succeeded by: William Walton Kitchin

Personal details
- Born: Robert Brodnax Glenn; August 11, 1854 Rockingham County, North Carolina, U.S.
- Died: May 16, 1920 (aged 65) Winnipeg, Manitoba, Canada
- Party: Democratic
- Spouse: Cornelia Deaderick
- Children: 2
- Education: Davidson College; University of Virginia
- Profession: Lawyer, politician

Robert Brodnax Glenn (August 11, 1854 – May 16, 1920) was an American lawyer, prosecuting attorney, U.S. attorney, and politician who served as a state senator and as the 51st governor of the U.S. state of North Carolina from 1905 to 1909.

== Early life and career ==
A native of Rockingham County, North Carolina, Glenn was born to Chalmers Lanier Glenn and Annie S. Dodge. He graduated from Davidson College in 1874, attended the University of Virginia law school for a year, and then studied law under Chief Justice Richmond Mumford Pearson. He began practicing law in Stokes County before moving to Winston-Salem, where he joined the law firm of Glenn, Manly & Henderson, a predecessor firm to the modern-day Womble Carlyle Sandridge & Rice PLLC. In 1885, he became prosecuting attorney for the state's ninth district. From 1893 until 1897, he served as United States Attorney for the Western District of North Carolina. Glenn was elected to the North Carolina Senate in 1898.

== Governor ==
Glenn was known as the "Prohibition Governor" for his successful 1908 campaign to ban liquor statewide. Glenn was also interested in conservation, as evidenced by his remark at the National Governors Association meeting of 1908: "our forests are being denuded...the failure of the People throughout the States to protect the great forest industry of our country...is one of the chief sources if not the greatest source of all [natural resource waste]...Our People, regardless of the future, have been living only for the present, thinking of themselves and not of their children and their children's children." Oher reforms were realized during his time in office.

In 1906, a mob in Salisbury, North Carolina lynched five black men who were accused of murdering a white family. Governor Glenn ordered three companies of state militia to the scene, but it was too late; the five were already dead. The next day, Glenn, at the sheriff's request, sent the military companies to Salisbury to guard the jail now holding one alleged lyncher. Glenn went to Salisbury himself two days later to testify in the trial of the soon to be convicted lynching "leader," George Hall. Eventually, the lynch mob leader was tried and sentenced to fifteen years in prison, the first such conviction for lynching in North Carolina history. Hall, however, was pardoned by Governor Kitchin before serving the full term. Public outcry over the lynching and concern about its negative effect on North Carolina's business prospects prompted Glenn to send out an executive order to all county sheriffs and all state militia companies to inform him immediately of any rumor of a lynching in the future, and to shoot to kill if necessary to guard prisoners threatened by mob violence.

In 1908, while still serving as governor, Glenn was ordained as an elder at First Presbyterian Church (Raleigh, North Carolina), in what was believed to be the first instance of a sitting governor of the state assuming an ordained office in any church.

== Later life ==
Glenn returned to practicing law in Winston-Salem after leaving office in 1909.

In 1915, Glenn was appointed to the International Boundary Commission by President Woodrow Wilson, who was a former classmate of Glenn's from Davidson College.

Glenn died in 1920 and was buried in the Salem Cemetery.

== Legacy ==
Glenn was a resident of Winston-Salem, North Carolina. Robert B. Glenn High School in Kernersville, North Carolina, is named after the former governor.

His boyhood home, Lower Sauratown Plantation, was listed on the National Register of Historic Places in 1984.

Party political offices
Preceded by Charles Brantley Aycock	Democratic nominee for Governor of North Carolina; 1904	Succeeded by William Walton Kitchin
Political offices
Preceded by Charles Brantley Aycock	Governor of North Carolina; 1905–1909	Succeeded by William Walton Kitchin
