= John A. Moon =

American politician (1855–1921)

John Austin Moon
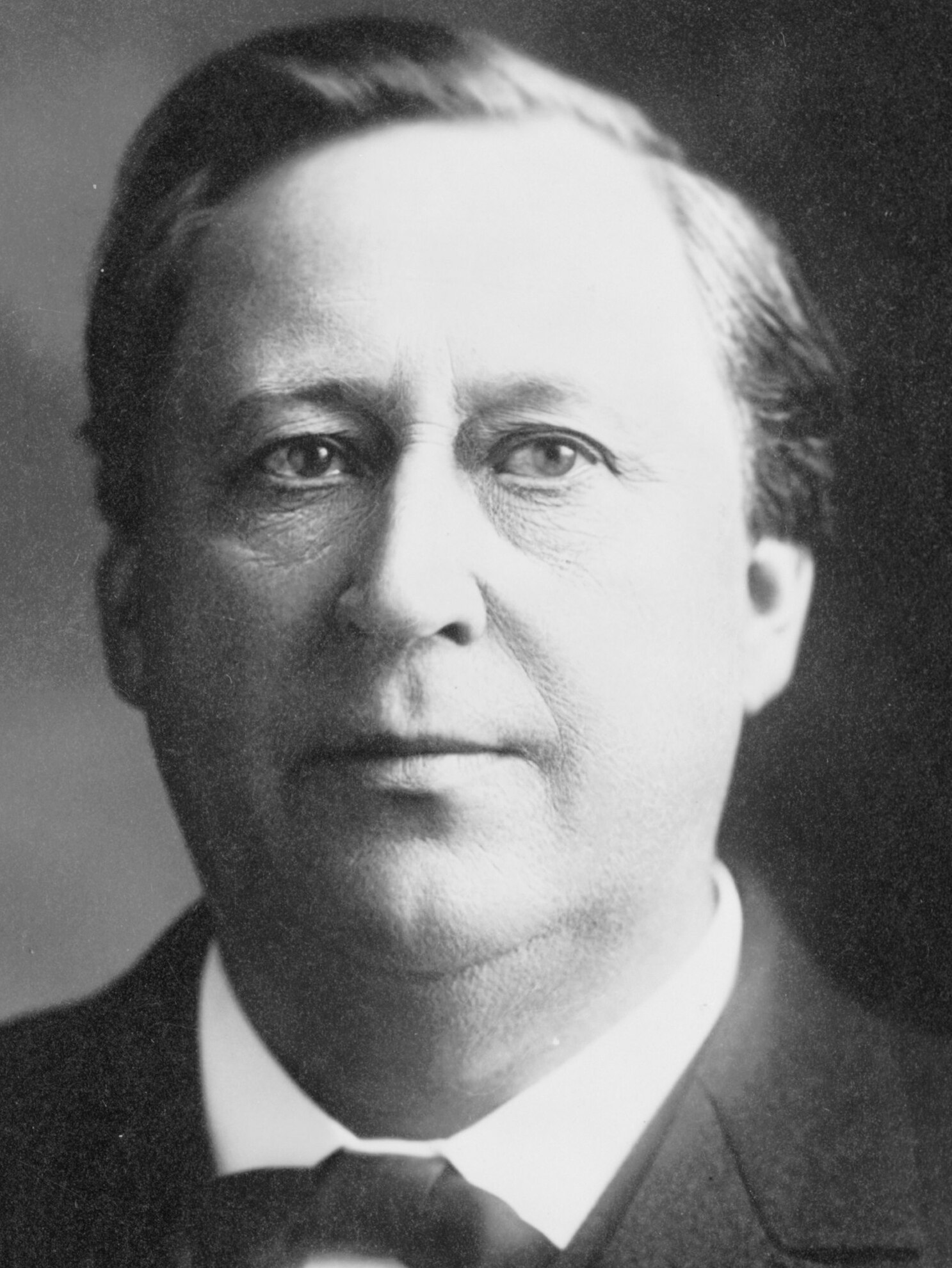
- Moon, c. 1912

Member of the U.S. House of Representatives from Tennessee's 3rd district
- In office March 4, 1897 – March 3, 1921
- Preceded by: Foster V. Brown
- Succeeded by: Joseph Edgar Brown

Personal details
- Born: April 22, 1855 Albemarle County, Virginia, U.S.
- Died: June 26, 1921 (aged 66) Chattanooga, Tennessee, U.S.
- Citizenship: United States
- Party: Democratic
- Spouse: Adeline Deaderick Moon
- Children: Anna Mary Moon; William Deaderick Moon
- Education: King College
- Profession: Attorney; politician; judge

John Austin Moon (April 22, 1855 – June 26, 1921) was an American politician and a member of the United States House of Representatives for the 3rd congressional district of Tennessee.

== Biography ==
Born on April 22, 1855, near Charlottesville, Virginia in Albemarle County, Moon moved with his parents to Bristol, Virginia in 1857, and then to Chattanooga, Tennessee in 1870. He attended public and private schools and King College in Bristol, Tennessee. He studied law, was admitted to the Alabama bar, at the age of nineteen. He moved to Chattanooga in 1874, was admitted to the Tennessee Bar Association and commenced practice in Chattanooga, Tennessee. He married Adeline McDowell Deaderick, daughter of James W. Deaderick and Adeline Shelby Deaderick. Their two children are Anna Mary Moon and William Deaderick Moon.

== Career ==
Moon was the city attorney of Chattanooga in 1881 and 1882. He was a member of the state Democratic executive committee in 1888. Commissioned in May 1889 as a special circuit judge, and twice reappointed, he held the office until January 3, 1891. He was appointed regular judge for the fourth circuit and served until August 1892. He was elected circuit judge in 1892, and was re-elected in 1894 for a term of eight years, but he resigned when he was elected to Congress.

Elected as a Democrat to the Fifty-fifth and the eleven succeeding Congresses, Moon served from March 4, 1897, to March 3, 1921. He was chairman of the United States House Committee on Post Office and Post Roads during the Sixty-second through Sixty-fifth Congresses. He was a delegate to the Democratic National Convention in 1900.

== Death ==
Moon was renominated for Congress in 1921, but before election, he became ill and died in Chattanooga, Tennessee on June 26, 1921 (age 66 years, 65 days). He is interred at Forest Hill Cemetery.

U.S. House of Representatives
Preceded by Foster V. Brown	U.S. Representative for Tennessee's 3rd congressional district 1897-1921	Succeeded by Joseph Edgar Brown
