= Charles Brantley Aycock =

American politician (1859–1912)

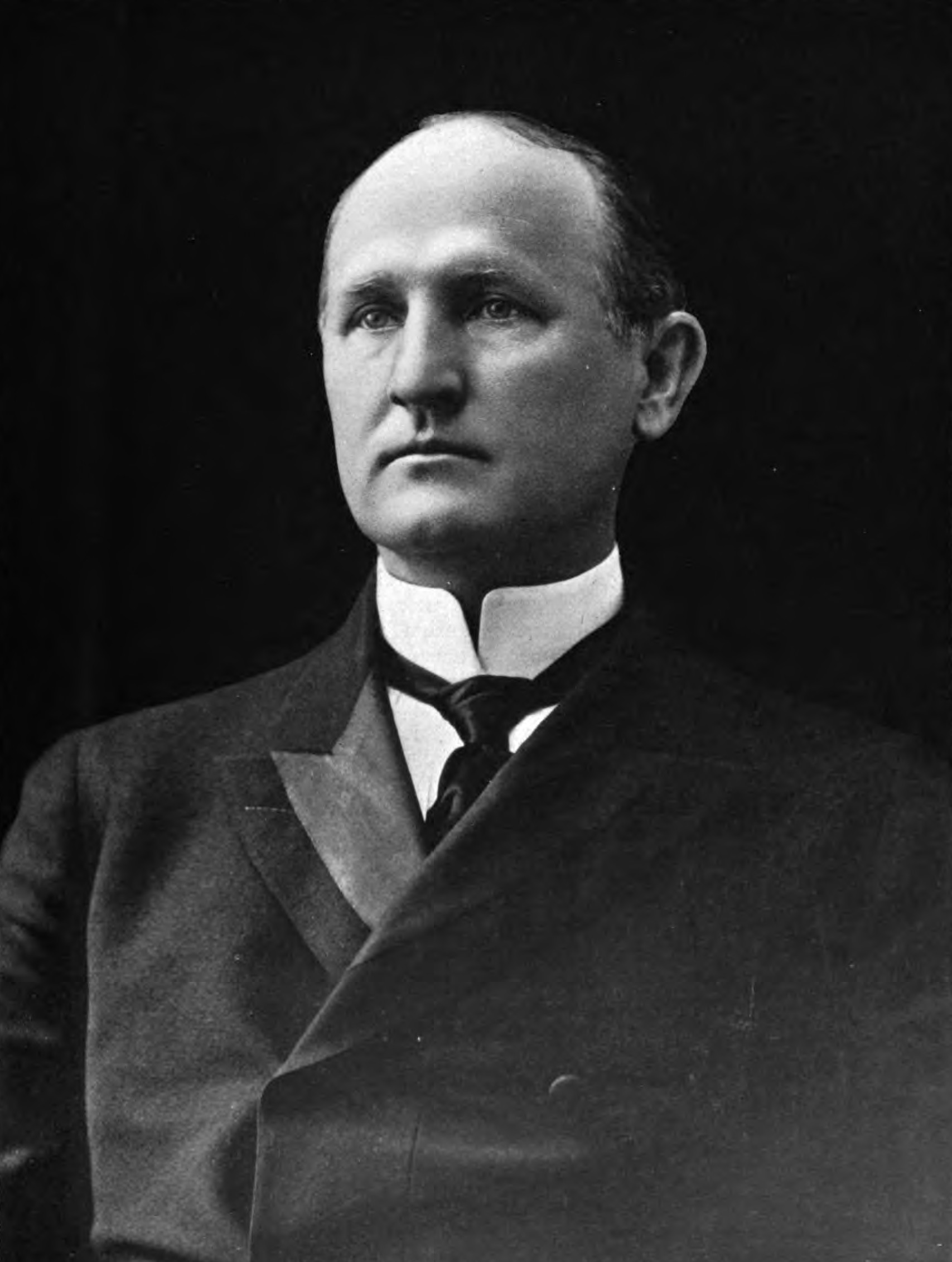
- Charles Aycock, from The World's Work

50th Governor of North Carolina
- In office January 15, 1901 – January 11, 1905
- Preceded by: Daniel Lindsay Russell
- Succeeded by: Robert Broadnax Glenn

United States Attorney for the Eastern District of North Carolina
- In office 1893–1897
- President: Grover Cleveland
- Preceded by: Charles A. Cooke
- Succeeded by: Claude M. Bernard

Personal details
- Born: November 1, 1859 Wayne County, North Carolina, U.S.
- Died: April 4, 1912 (aged 52) Birmingham, Alabama, U.S.
- Cause of death: Heart attack
- Party: Democratic
- Spouse(s): Varina Woodard; Cora Lily Woodard
- Children: 10
- Relatives: Lucile Aycock McKee (granddaughter)
- Education: University of North Carolina at Chapel Hill
- Occupation: Politician; lawyer; educator

Charles Brantley Aycock (November 1, 1859 – April 4, 1912) was the 50th governor of the U.S. state of North Carolina from 1901 to 1905. After starting his career as a lawyer and teacher, he became active in the Democratic Party during the Solid South period, and made his reputation as a prominent segregationist as the lead perpetrator of the Wilmington massacre.

He became known as the "Education Governor" for advocating improvements to North Carolina's public school systems. After he left office, he traveled the country promoting educational causes.

== Early life ==
Charles B. Aycock was born in Wayne County, North Carolina, as the youngest of the 10 children of Benjamin and Serena Aycock. His family lived near the present-day town of Fremont, North Carolina, then known as Nahunta. Though his father died when he was 15, his mother and older brothers recognized his abilities and determined that he should go to college. Aycock attended the University of North Carolina (today the University of North Carolina at Chapel Hill) and joined the Philanthropic Society, a debate and literary society at the university. After graduating in 1880 with first honors in both oratory and essay writing, he entered law practice in Goldsboro and supplemented his income by teaching school. His success in both fields led to his appointment as superintendent of schools for Wayne County and to service on the school board in Goldsboro.

His political career began in 1888 as a presidential elector for Grover Cleveland, when he gained distinction as an orator and political debater. From 1893 to 1897, he served as U.S. attorney for the Eastern District of North Carolina.

== Personal life ==
Aycock married Varina Woodard, daughter of Baptist lay minister and farmer William Woodard and Delpha Rountree Woodard, in 1881. They had three children together: Ernest Aycock, Charles Brantley Aycock, Jr., and Alice Varina Aycock. Ernest and the younger Charles died in childhood, while Alice went on to marry the writer Clarence Hamilton Poe. Varina died on July 9, 1889. On January 7, 1891, he married her sister, Cora Lily Woodard. They had seven children: William Benjamin Aycock, Mary Lily Aycock, Connor Woodard Aycock, John Lee Aycock, Louise Roundtree Aycock, Frank Daniels Aycock, and Brantley Aycock.

== White supremacy campaigns ==
In 1898 and 1900, Aycock was prominent in the Democratic Party's "white supremacy" campaigns. Aycock's involvement with the Wilmington massacre of 1898 is chronicled in an official state commission report. "Planned violence to suppress the African American and Republican communities grew into unplanned bloodshed. The frenzy over white supremacy victory, incessantly repeated by orators such as Alfred Moore Waddell and Charles Aycock, simply could not be quieted after an overwhelming and somewhat anticlimactic election victory." Aycock was reportedly not present in Wilmington the day of the insurrection.

In 1899, the heavily Democratic state legislature of North Carolina passed a suffrage amendment to the state constitution. This amendment added a poll tax and literacy test intended to prevent black voting, and a grandfather clause to avoid disenfranchising poor white voters. Aycock supported the amendment, and urged legislatures to submit it to a popular vote in an August election, moved up from November. In that election, Aycock ran for governor against Republican Spencer B. Adams. On the campaign trail, his supporters displayed one of the rapid-fire guns from the Wilmington massacre and Aycock regularly appeared with Red Shirts.

Indeed it has become the fashion among Republicans and Populists to assert the unfitness of the negro to rule, but when they use the word rule, they confine it to holding office. When we say that the negro is unfit to rule we carry it one step further and convey the correct idea when we declare that he is unfit to vote. To do this we must disfranchise the negro. This movement comes from the people. Politicians have been afraid of it and have hesitated, but the great mass of white men in the State are now demanding and have demanded that the matter be settled once and for all. To do so is both desirable and necessary – desirable because it sets the white man free to move along faster than he can go when retarded by the slower movement of the negro.

— Charles Aycock, Address Accepting the Democratic Nomination for Governor, April 11, 1900

In the 1900 North Carolina gubernatorial election, the suffrage amendment was confirmed and Aycock was elected governor. He reportedly won 60% of the vote, but this was in part due to voter fraud. In several counties, the number of votes for Aycock exceeded the number of eligible voters by several hundred.

== Governor ==
As governor, Aycock became known as the "Education Governor" for his support of the public school system. It was said that one school was constructed in the state for every day he was in office. He supposedly dedicated himself to education after watching his mother make her mark, rather than a signature, when signing a deed. Aycock felt that no lasting social reform could be accomplished without education. He supported increased salaries for teachers, longer school terms, and new school buildings: "690 new schoolhouses erected, including 599 for whites and 91 for blacks."

Aycock is credited for adding schools for black students, but noted for advocating that black students be educated through curriculum and care tightly controlled by North Carolina whites, to "benefit the black race to fit them into a subordinate role."

Let us cast away all fear of rivalry with the negro, all apprehension that he shall ever overtake us in the race of life. We are the thoroughbreds and should have no fear of winning the race against a commoner stock. An effort to reduce their public schools would send thousands more of them away from us. In this hour, when our industrial development demands more labor and not less, it becomes of the utmost importance that we shall make no mistake in dealing with that race which does a very large part of the work, of actual hard labor in the State.

— Gov. Aycock, Address Before the Democratic State Convention at Greensboro, June 23, 1904

Historian Morgan Kousser wrote that Aycock's progressive attitude toward black education was based on white Democrats' desire to ensure that the disfranchisement of black voters would not be reversed by federal government intervention. Kousser wrote,

"Some scholars have made a great deal of the opposition of 'progressive' Governor Charles B. Aycock and state school superintendent James Y. Joyner to the movement for a constitutional amendment in North Carolina to limit black school expenditures to the amount paid by Negroes in taxes. It is true that Aycock threatened resignation if such a law passed and that, speaking to the legislature in 1903, he condemned the proposed measure as 'unjust, unwise and unconstitutional.' Yet in the same address he put greater stress on his view that the act was impolitic than he did on its injustice. The law would invite a challenge in federal court, he believed, and 'if it should be made to appear to the Court that in connection with our disfranchisement of the negro we had taken pains for providing to keep him in ignorance, then both amendments [the literacy test and racial separation of taxes] would fall together.' In other words, the disfranchisement of the almost unanimously Republican blacks, which was virtually priceless to the Democrats, would be bartered for the temporary gain of a few extra dollars of the school fund."

Aycock presided other progressive measures as governor such as the building of roads, higher taxes on corporations, the creation of new regulations on railroads, and the passage of child labor and temperance laws. Aycock fought against lynching as governor, but expanded the state's convict leasing program, a de facto form of slavery.

== "The Negro Problem" ==
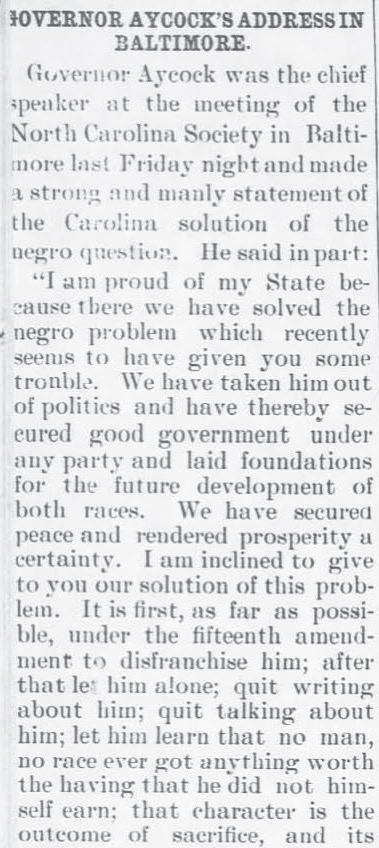
Aycock's Address in Baltimore. "The News-Herald." 24 Dec 1903.

On December 18, 1903, Governor Aycock went to Baltimore gave a speech to 300 people at the North Carolina Society. Entitled "The Negro Problem," the speech outlined his thoughts on keeping blacks separate, subservient, and locked out of representative government by circumventing the Fifteenth Amendment, which guarantees the right to vote. Aycock's may have been a response to The Negro Problem, a book by prominent black scholars including W.E.B. DuBois and Booker T. Washington, that considers the web of economic, political, and social problems faced by blacks in their collective history as slaves and second-class citizens after Emancipation. The book had been released about two months before Aycock's speech.

The speech is one of Aycock's best-known and controversial:

I am proud of my State … because there we have solved the negro problem … We have taken him out of politics and have thereby secured good government under any party and laid foundations for the future development of both races. We have secured peace, and rendered prosperity a certainty.

I am inclined to give to you our solution of this problem. It is, first, as far as possible under the Fifteenth Amendment to disfranchise him; after that let him alone, quit writing about him; quit talking about him, quit making him “the white man’s burden,” let him “tote his own skillet”; quit coddling him, let him learn that no man, no race, ever got anything worth the having that he did not himself earn; that character is the outcome of sacrifice and worth is the result of toil; that whatever his future may be, the present has in it for him nothing that is not the product of industry, thrift, obedience to law, and uprightness; that he cannot, by resolution of council or league, accomplish anything; that he can do much by work; that violence may gratify his passions but it cannot accomplish his ambitions; that he may eat rarely of the cooking of equality, but he will always find when he does that “there is death in the pot.” Let the negro learn once for all that there is unending separation of the races, that the two peoples may develop side by side to the fullest but that they cannot intermingle; let the white man determine that no man shall by act or thought or speech cross this line, and the race problem will be at an end.

These things are not said in enmity to the negro but in regard for him. He constitutes one third of the population of my State: he has always been my personal friend; as a lawyer I have often defended him, and as Governor I have frequently protected him. But there flows in my veins the blood of the dominant race; that race that has conquered the earth and seeks out the mysteries of the heights and depths. If manifest destiny leads to the seizure of Panama, it is certain that it likewise leads to the dominance of the Caucasian. When the negro recognizes this fact we shall have peace and good will between the races.

But I would not have the white people forget their duty to the negro. We must seek the truth and pursue it. We owe an obligation to “the man in black”; we brought him here; he served us well; he is patient and teachable. We owe him gratitude; above all we owe him justice. We cannot forget his fidelity and we ought not to magnify his faults; we cannot change his color, neither can we ignore his service. No individual ever “rose on stepping stones of dead” others “to higher things,” and no people can. We must rise by ourselves, we must execute judgment in righteousness; we must educate not only ourselves but see to it that the negro has an opportunity for education. As a white man I am afraid of but one thing for my race and that is that we shall become afraid to give the negro a fair chance. The first duty of every man is to develop himself to the uttermost and the only limitation upon his duty is that he shall take pains to see that in his own development he does no injustice to those beneath him. This is true of races as well as of individuals. Considered properly it is not a limitation but a condition of development. The white man in the South can never attain to his fullest growth until he does absolute justice to the negro race. If he is doing that now, it is well for him. If he is not doing it, he must seek to know the ways of truth and pursue them. My own opinion is, that so far we have done well, and that the future holds no menace for us if we do the duty which lies next to us, training, developing the coming generation, so that the problems which seem difficult to us shall be easy to them.

== Later life ==
After leaving the governor's office in 1905, Aycock resumed his law practice. He was persuaded to run for the Senate seat held by fellow Democrat Furnifold M. Simmons in 1912. But before the nomination was decided, Aycock died of a heart attack on April 4, 1912, while making a speech to 5,000 teachers at the convention of the Alabama Education Association in Birmingham.

One account says, "The subject of Aycock's speech was 'Universal Education'. After he had talked for a few minutes, Aycock spoke the words: 'I have always talked about education—.' Here he stopped, threw up his hands, reeled backward, and fell dead".

But another, by a reporter at the scene, says Aycock told the teachers, "I have fought long the battles of education," and added, after asking a question of Alabama Governor Emmet O'Neal, "However, I have determined, if such a thing is possible, to open the doors of the schools to every child..." He stopped, staggered and fell dead of a heart attack.

== Legacy ==
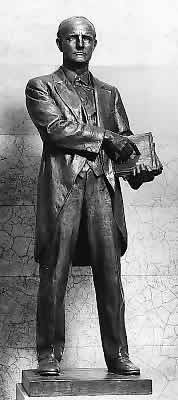
Aycock's statue in the U.S. Capitol (2010)

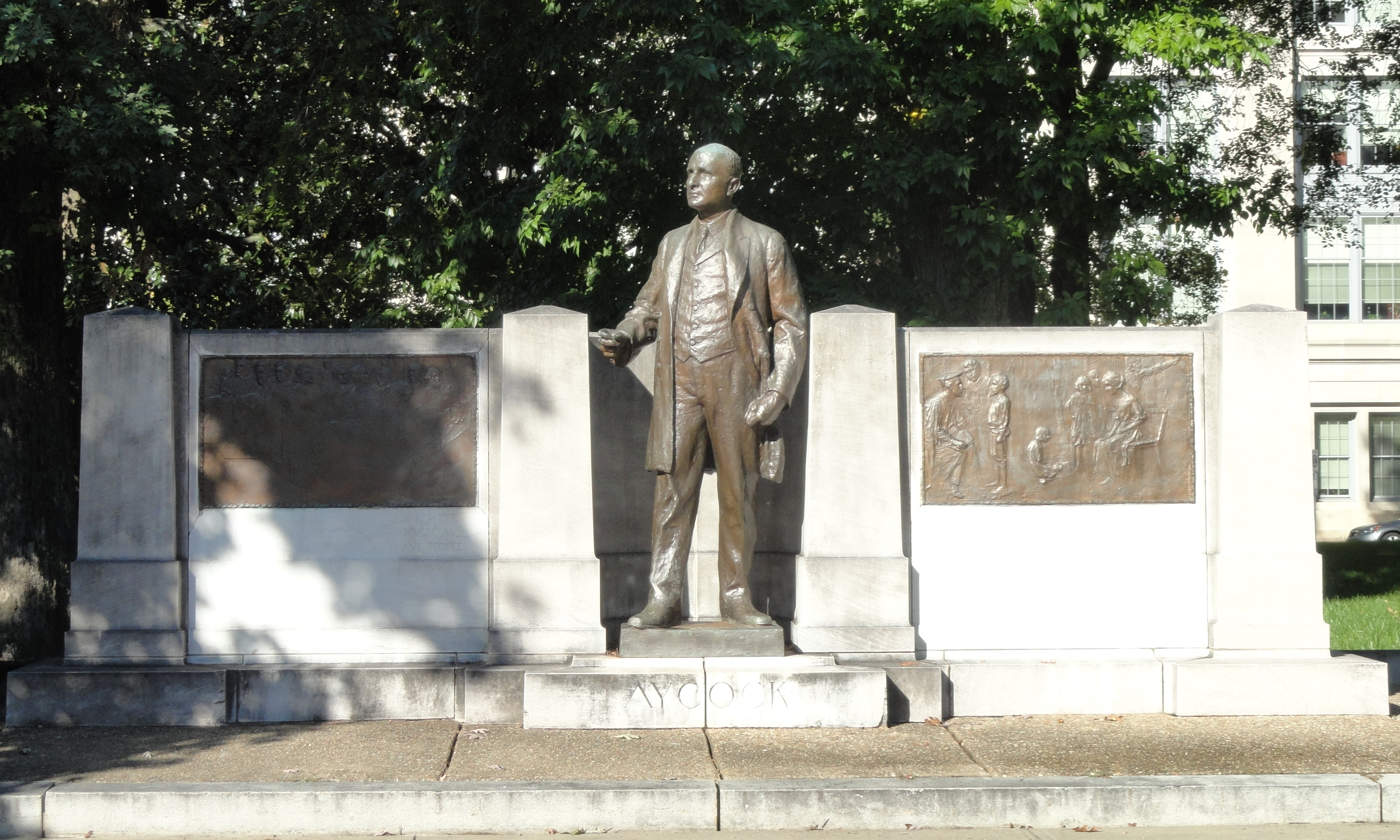
Memorial to Aycock at the North Carolina State Capitol

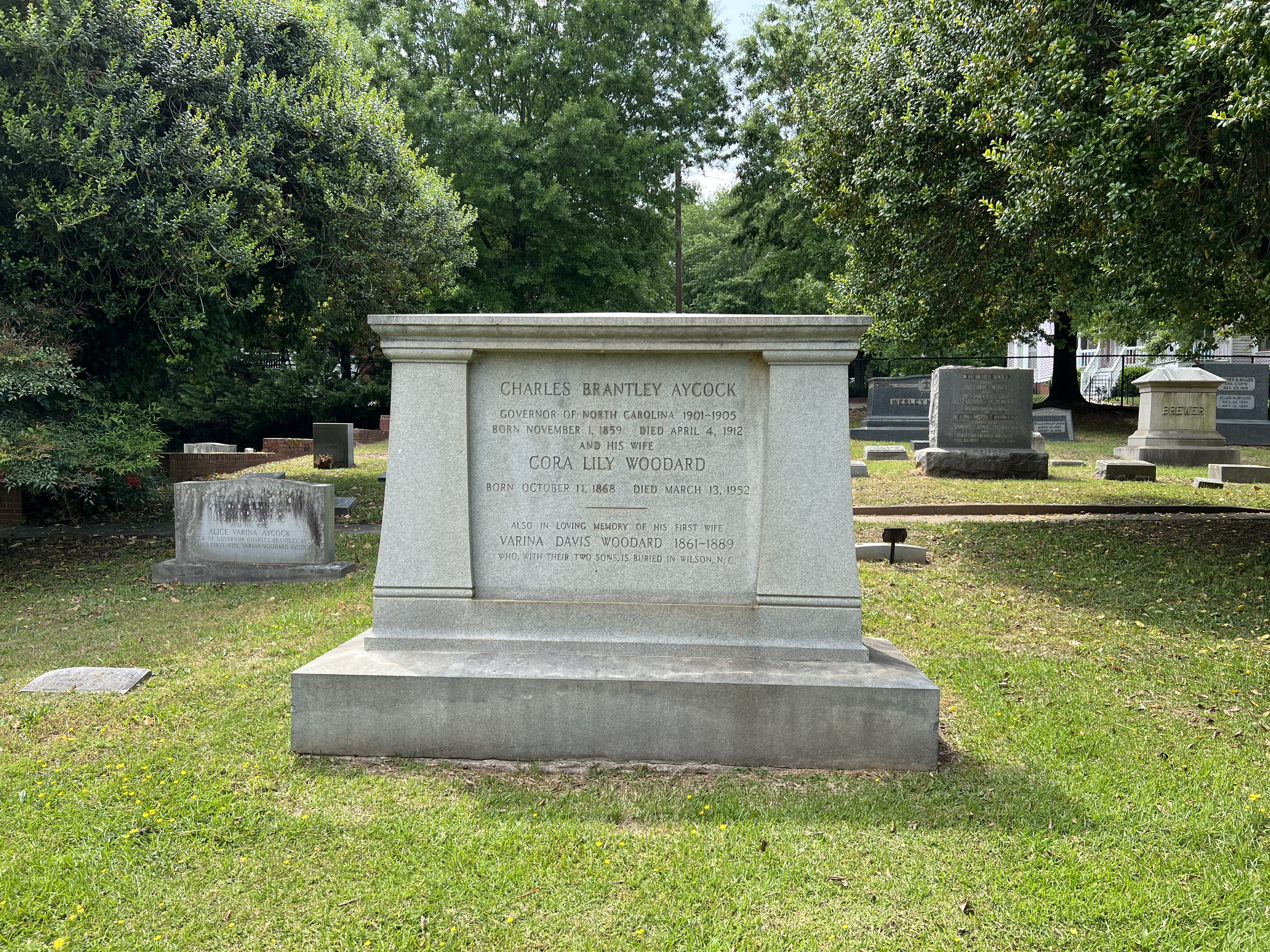
Tombstone at Historic Oakwood Cemetery

In Greensboro, North Carolina, the auditorium at UNC Greensboro, as well as a street, a neighborhood, and a middle school were named for him. Dormitories at UNC-Chapel Hill and East Carolina University campuses were named after him, although ECU renamed the dorm in 2015. UNC-Chapel Hill followed suit in 2020, renaming the dormitory for Hortense McClinton, the first black faculty member at the school. In Pikeville, North Carolina, Charles B. Aycock High School is named after him. There is an Aycock Elementary School in Henderson.

The Aycock Elementary School in Asheville was closed in the 1980s and has been used as the campus for Asheville City Preschool and, more recently, Asheville Primary School (public Montessori); the plaque bearing the Aycock name was removed in 2020. Aycock High School in Cedar Grove graduated its last class in 1963.

A small street in the Chapel Hill neighborhood of Governors Club is named after him, along with numerous other governors of North Carolina.

In 1965, a junior high school in Raleigh, North Carolina, was named after him; it was absorbed into William G. Enloe High School in 1979. A street in Raleigh's Five Points neighborhood is named for him.

For most of the 20th century, Aycock was characterized by state historians and politicians as an admirable figure, reflected in the choice to have a statue of him as one of the two submitted by the state to the National Statuary Hall Collection. In the 1933 textbook The Story of North Carolina, Aycock is described as "one of the best friends that colored people had."

In recent years, that viewpoint has been challenged:

Often overlooked was Aycock's role as a leading spokesman in the white supremacy campaigns of 1898 and 1900, which were marked by widespread violence, voter intimidation, voter fraud and even a coup d'état of the government of Wilmington … The campaigns had far-reaching consequences: blacks were removed from the voter rolls based on literacy tests, Jim Crow customs were encoded into law, and the Democratic Party controlled Tar Heel politics for two-thirds of the 20th century.

In 2011, the N.C. Democratic Party dropped Aycock's name from its annual fundraiser after Democratic and Republican lawmakers drew attention to his white-supremacy ties. Aycock had been included in the fundraiser's name since 1960.

On June 17, 2014, Duke University removed his name from a residence hall.

On February 20, 2015, East Carolina University trustees voted to remove Aycock's name from a residence hall after a months-long debate with faculty, students, staff and alumni. The trustees directed the university to represent Aycock's name in another campus location, where founders and other university supporters would be recognized.

In UNC Greensboro began reviewing proposals to remove Aycock's name from campus buildings. On February 18, 2016, UNCG's board of trustees voted unanimously to remove his name from the auditorium.

On August 25, 2015, the Guilford County school board voted 9–2 to rename Aycock Middle School in Greensboro, dropping the Aycock name.

On August 15, 2017, the Greensboro City Council voted to rename the Aycock Historic District, which included the formerly named Aycock Middle School (now Swann Middle School) to Dunleath Historic District.

On February 28, 2018, North Carolina governor Roy Cooper asked the Architect of the Capitol to replace Aycock's statue with one of evangelist Billy Graham, pursuant to legislation signed in 2015. Graham's statue was unveiled in National Stuatuary Hall on May 16, 2024, then moved to the Capitol Crypt.

On April 24, 2018, Greensboro City Council unanimously voted to rename North and South Aycock Street, which runs from West Florida Street to Wendover Avenue, to North and South Josephine Boyd Street after Josephine Boyd, the first black student to attend the all-white Greensboro High School (now Grimsley High School) in 1957.

On May 4, 2021, Raleigh City Council voted to rename Aycock Street to Roanoke Park Drive after a neighborhood petition.

== Bibliography ==
- Zucchino, David (2020). Wilmington's Lie: The Murderous Coup of 1898 and the Rise of White Supremacy. Atlantic Monthly Press. ISBN 9780802128386.

Party political offices
Preceded by Cyrus B. Watson	Democratic nominee for Governor of North Carolina; 1900	Succeeded by Robert Broadnax Glenn
Political offices
Preceded by Daniel Lindsay Russell	Governor of North Carolina; 1901–1905	Succeeded by Robert Broadnax Glenn
